= Cheyenne Autumn Trail =

1964 film

- Directed by: Ronald Saland
- Written by: Burt Sloane (created and written by)
- Produced by: Ronald Saland
- Narrated by: James Stewart
- Cinematography: Ross Lowell
- Edited by: Howard Kuperman
- Production company: A Professional Film Services Production
- Release date: 1964
- Running time: 19 minutes
- Country: US
- Language: English

Cheyenne Autumn Trail is a 19-minute live action American film produced in color for distribution in late 1964, with narration by James Stewart. Structured as a complementary social and historical companion piece to John Ford's final western, Cheyenne Autumn, it intersperses clips from the big-screen epic with background information about the Northern Cheyenne Exodus of 1878–79 and contrasts it with life on the Cheyenne reservation in 1964, as a tribal chief, a tribal beauty queen and a tribal adolescent take a drive along the route of the 19th-century trek.

== Production ==
Commissioned by John Ford's and his producer Bernard Smith's Ford - Smith Productions, the short documentary was produced and directed by Ronald Saland of Professional Film Services. It was created and written by Burt Sloane and photographed by Ross Lowell

== Synopsis ==
After several seconds of Native American chanting and before the appearance of opening credits, James Stewart's voice is heard speaking the initial lines: "Some of the past is forgotten — some is remembered. Dull Knife remembered and honored... Little Wolf remembered and honored. They were the last of the Cheyenne warrior chiefs. They led their people's great struggle to freedom and this homeland in Montana. The land of the Cheyenne is a land of beauty and peace now, but the heroic trail that brought them to it almost a century ago was a bitter, bloody trail."

The opening credits appear, with the title, Cheyenne Autumn Trail, hand-printed in block letters on a wooden plank nailed to a tree. At the bottom of the plank, in small type, are the names of the states the Cheyenne crossed in returning to their native grounds: Oklahoma - Kansas - Nebraska - South Dakota - Wyoming - Montana.

Chief John Woodenlegs, at his desk as president of the Northern Cheyenne Council at Lame Deer, Montana, is described in Stewart's narration as an "executive looking after today's needs of nineteen hundred people on the reservation". Shown next, at her desk, is college-trained Williamette Youpee, Miss Indian America 1963 who, Stewart states, "has her pretty eyes on the future". Shown next, riding his horse, is twelve-year-old Richard Roundstone, an honor student at the reservation school.

Stewart explains that "Chief Woodenlegs is guided by the story of the Cheyenne struggle for freedom in the old days and he wants Willi and Richard to know that proud story and to pass it on to generations that will follow and he's taking them from the Montana reservation to retrace the historic Cheyenne Autumn trail". At dawn, the trio departs in a small recreational vehicle and, along the way, Chief Woodenlegs unfolds maps as his voice is heard explaining that "the Cheyenne people were taken to Oklahoma and were getting sick and some of the younger people were dying and they wanted to go back to Montana... go back north fifteen hundred miles where they could live and hunt".

The first scene from Cheyenne Autumn, as narrated by Stewart, depicts the start of the journey on September 9, 1878. Chief Woodenlegs, Willi and Richard are shown visiting a remnant of 19th century network of army forts which Stewart names as "Scott, Randall, Larned, Robinson, Meade, Laramie...", explaining that "one by one, the garrisons were called out". The second scene from Cheyenne Autumn shows army wagons rolling across the plains.

As the vehicle continues along the highway, additional points along the route are examined as a third film clip depicts the cavalry tracking and pursuing the moving group of women, children and old people as they cross a wide river. Chief Woodenlegs and Richard find time to fish in the North Platte River where Chiefs "Little Wolf and Dull Knife outwitted a massive ambush and then found food for their people". In the present, Chief Woodenlegs and Richard bring the fish to the recreational vehicle kitchenette where Willi prepares their meal.

The fourth film clip depicts excerpts from the farcical "Battle of Dodge City" with the townspeople, accompanied by a cynical Wyatt Earp (portrayed by the documentary's narrator James Stewart) and Doc Holliday (portrayed by Arthur Kennedy), ineptly setting out on an ill-conceived Indian hunt. In the present, sitting under the moon, Chief Woodenlegs chants the sounds of his ancestors. As the modern drive continues and modern trains are seen, the fifth film clip shows the ragtag tribe crossing at night under a high railroad trestle. The 1964 travelers stop at Bear Butte, a sacred place for generations of Cheyenne. Chief Woodenlegs is heard explaining that "medicine men of the tribe, they go up to the mountain to offer prayers to the spirits before war... go up there and fast and ask the spirits... the good spirits... for the blessings."

The sixth film clip is the snowy trek of the tribe towards Fort Robinson, as Stewart describes the privations they suffered that winter. Willi is heard saying that "John would tell us about the buffalo migration... for days ahead you could feel them coming... could feel the earth tremble... and then they would come and they would look like a black rippling carpet... as far as you could see there were buffalo running and the sky would be just hanging heavy with the dust that was raised from their hooves... and it would take about three days for them to pass and it was the end of the herd they hunted."

The seventh clip shows Little Wolf, Dull Knife and the hungry tribe finding only bones remaining from the mass buffalo slaughter. As Chief Woodenlegs, Willi and Richard watch buffalo at play, the eighth clip shows the most savage battle in the Dakotas... the Badlands. Finally, Stewart declares that "one hundred and ninety-seven days it raged... the Cheyenne Autumn struggle... and in the end, the people of Little Wolf and Dull Knife won their homeland. They could not be conquered. There's no finer story of human spirit than the will to be free."

The final stop is the annual All-American Indian Day Celebration in Sheridan, Wyoming where Miss Indian America is chosen. Scenes from the festival are shown as Stewart concludes, "Williamette Youpee, John Woodenlegs, Richard Roundstone... they're Americans of today, bound together by a memory of the old ways and the old courage... the memory will help them continue the great tradition forged along the Cheyenne Autumn Trail".

== End credits ==
"Filmed with the cooperation of

United States Department of Interior,
Bureau of Indian Affairs

Custer State Park, South Dakota

Chevrolet Camper courtesy of
Chevrolet Motor Car Division
General Motors

Feature scenes from
the new Warner Bros. motion picture
John Ford's "CHEYENNE AUTUMN"
starring / James Stewart / Richard Widmark / Carroll Baker / Karl Malden / Sal Mineo / Edward G. Robinson

Copyright MCMLXIV by Ford - Smith Productions
& Warner Bros. Pictures, Inc. All rights reserved

== Availability on DVD ==
Cheyenne Autumn Trail is included as an extra feature on the Cheyenne Autumn DVD issued in 2006.
