= Cheyenne Autumn =

1964 film by John Ford

- Theatrical release poster
- Directed by: John Ford
- Screenplay by: James R. Webb
- Based on: Cheyenne Autumn by Mari Sandoz
- Produced by: Bernard Smith
- Starring: Richard Widmark; Carroll Baker; Karl Malden; Sal Mineo; Ricardo Montalbán; Dolores del Río; Gilbert Roland; Arthur Kennedy; James Stewart; Edward G. Robinson
- Cinematography: William Clothier
- Edited by: Otho Lovering
- Music by: Alex North
- Production company: John Ford–Bernard Smith Productions
- Distributed by: Warner Bros. Pictures
- Release date: October 3, 1964
- Running time: 154 minutes
- Country: United States
- Language: English
- Budget: $6.6–7.37 million
- Box office: $3.5 million (US/Canada rentals)

Cheyenne Autumn is a 1964 American epic Western film starring Richard Widmark, Carroll Baker, James Stewart, and Edward G. Robinson. It tells the story of a factual event, the Northern Cheyenne Exodus of 1878–79, told with artistic license. The film was the last Western directed by John Ford, who proclaimed it an elegy for the Native Americans who had been abused by the U.S. government and misrepresented in numerous of his own films. With a budget of more than $4 million, the film was relatively unsuccessful at the box office and failed to earn a profit for Warner Bros. Pictures.

== Plot ==
In 1878, the surviving Cheyenne natives have migrated 1,500 miles (2,414 km) from their Yellowstone homeland. At their Oklahoma homestead, their plight is witnessed by Deborah Wright, a Quaker school teacher, who takes the Cheyenne children as her students. Their trek has been accompanied by a United States Army cavalry troop headed by Captain Thomas Archer, who is engaged to Deborah. Nearby, the Cheyenne natives and Archer's troops are waiting for a congressional committee sent by the Bureau of Indian Affairs (BIA), but are informed by letter that their trip has delayed and are staying at Fort Reno.

Captain Archer calls Dull Knife and Little Wolf, two Native leaders, pledging the BIA will continue to provide for the natives. Angered at the BIA's slow response, Dull Knife withdraws the Cheyenne children from Deborah's school. Later that night, Deborah learns from Spanish Woman that the Cheyenne have decided to migrate back to Yellowstone. She decides to travel with them. The next morning, Archer sees the Cheyenne have left and sends a search party with no artillery. One soldier, Second Lieutenant Scott, cares little for their exodus, as his father was killed in the Fetterman massacre in 1866.

Within a canyon, Archer's men have caught up with the Cheyenne. Little Wolf sends Red Shirt, Spanish Woman's son, to fight against the troops. Archer sends two soldiers to search the canyon, but one is shot by Red Shirt. Major Braden takes control and has the soldiers fire two cannons; a brief fight ensues in which nine soldiers, including Braden, were killed. It is then reported in the local newspapers, which deliberately inflate the death count and depict the Cheyenne as savages. News of the attack reaches Carl Schurz, the Secretary of the Interior, in Washington, DC.

Archer sends Scott to patrol the Cheyenne, but Scott instead proceeds with an attack. Another fight erupts, in which Scott is wounded. After 500 miles (805 km), the Cheyenne begin to approach Dodge City, Kansas, only to learn that White settlers have resided there. Meanwhile, news of their arrival spread in the local newspaper, which alarms the townspeople. At a nearby parlor, lawmen Wyatt Earp and Doc Holliday are unconcerned, while the local townspeople organize a war campaign to combat the Cheyenne. Earp and Holliday deliberately lead the campaign in the wrong direction, but head back after a minor scuffle.

Months pass, and Archer, still in pursuit of the Cheyenne, recruits Sr. First Sergeant Wichowsky. By wintertime, the Cheyenne are beleaguered from their long journey, and they break into two factions; one half continues their trek, while the other half (led by Dull Knife) surrenders to Captain Henry W. Wessells Jr. at Fort Robinson and are confined to a barracks. Archer's troops arrive at Fort Robinson, as well, where Archer reunites Deborah, but Wessels intends for the Cheyenne to return to Oklahoma. Angered, Archer goes to Washington, DC, to Secretary Schurz's office, where he pleads on behalf of the Cheyenne. Schurz agrees.

Wessells is removed from his post for drunkenly behavior, and is confined to his quarters. Before relief arrives, Dull Knife's Cheyenne faction ambush the stationed troops, leaving Wessells stunned. Sometime later, Archer and Schurz meet with Little Wolf and Dull Knife to negotiate a treaty permitting the Cheyenne to return to their homeland. Once there, Red Shirt and Little Wolf engage in a rifle duel, in which Red Shirt is killed. Little Wolf, having broken his vow never to kill another Cheyenne, ventures into self-exile. With the Cheyenne back in their homeland, Archer and Deborah decide to remain there with them.

== Cast ==
- Richard Widmark as Capt. Thomas Archer
- Carroll Baker as Deborah Wright
- Karl Malden as Capt. Henry W. Wessells Jr., a Fort Robinson commander
- Sal Mineo as Red Shirt
- Dolores del Río as Spanish Woman, Red Shirt's mother
- Ricardo Montalbán as Little Wolf
- Gilbert Roland as Dull Knife
- Arthur Kennedy as Doc Holliday
- Patrick Wayne as Second Lieut. Scott
- Elizabeth Allen as Miss Plantagenet
- John Carradine as Jeff Blair
- Victor Jory as Tall Tree
- Mike Mazurki as Sr. First Sergeant Wichowsky
- George O'Brien as Major Braden
- Sean McClory as Dr. O'Carberry
- Judson Pratt as Mayor Dog Kelly
- Carmen D'Antonio as Pawnee Woman
- Ken Curtis as Joe
- James Stewart as Wyatt Earp
- Edward G. Robinson as Carl Schurz, the Secretary of the Interior

Uncredited (in order of appearance)
Walter Baldwin	Quaker elder Jeremy Wright, Deborah Wright's uncle
Bing Russell	Telegraph operator sharing coffee with Captain Archer
Ben Johnson	Trooper Plumtree who is told by Archer to check for visiting congressmen
Harry Carey Jr.	Trooper Smith, whom Archer calls "Jones" and then "Brown"
Chuck Hayward	Trooper
David Humphreys Miller	Trooper
Bill Williams	Trooper
Carleton Young	Aide to Carl Schurz
Charles Seel	New York Globe publisher
Denver Pyle	One-armed senator whom Carl Schurz addresses as "Henry"
William Forrest	Senator visiting Carl Schurz
Shug Fisher	Skinny, cattle drive trail boss; also in Dodge City
Chuck Roberson	Cattle drover; also in Dodge City
Jeannie Epper	Entertainer in Dodge City with Miss Plantagenet
Harry Strang	Bartender in Dodge City
Charles Morton	Bartender in Dodge City
Joe Brooks	Bartender in Dodge City
Harry Hickox	Bartender in Dodge City
John Qualen	Svenson, townsman in Dodge City
Philo McCullough	Townsman in Dodge City
Rudy Bowman	Townsman in Dodge City
Mae Marsh	Townswoman in Dodge City
William Henry	Infantry captain in the fort before Fort Robinson
James Flavin	Sergeant of the Guard in Fort Robinson
Walter Reed	Lieutenant Peterson in Fort Robinson
Montie Montana	Trooper in Fort Robinson
Jack Williams	Trooper in Fort Robinson
Ted Mapes	Trooper in Fort Robinson
Willis Bouchey	Colonel at Victory Cave whose orders are challenged by Carl Schurz

== Production ==
=== Development ===
John Ford long wanted to make a movie about the Cheyenne exodus, telling future director Peter Bogdanovich during filming: "I had wanted to make it for a long time. I've killed more Indians than Custer, Beecher and Chivington put together, and people in Europe always want to know about the Indians. There are two sides to every story, but I wanted to show their point of view for a change." He became interested after reading Mari Sandoz's book Cheyenne Autumn when it was published in 1953. As early as 1957, he wrote a treatment with screenwriter Dudley Nichols and then his son Patrick Ford, after filming The Searchers (1956). Early drafts of the script drew inspiration from Sandoz's book and Howard Fast's 1941 novel The Last Frontier. However, the film rights to Fast's novel were unavailable as Columbia Pictures had acquired them for Sidney Buchman. Columbia's project never advanced into production due to accusations made that Buchman and Fast were alleged Communists during the Hollywood blacklist and outside pressure from FBI director J. Edgar Hoover.

By 1962, Ford reignited his interest in the Cheyenne exodus after collaborating with Bernard Smith on How the West Was Won (1962). They pitched their project to several Hollywood studios, including Warner Bros. Pictures, who passed on the project. Smith went back to Warner Bros., telling its co-founder Jack L. Warner that My Fair Lady (1964) was too expensive of a project and a John Ford western would work as an insurance policy, being "a picture that has a guaranteed audience." Convinced, Warner approved the project with a production budget totaled at $4.2 million, providing the allocated funds to shoot in Super Panavision 70.

Ford then hired James R. Webb, who had written the screenplay to How the West Was Won (1962), to write the script for Cheyenne Autumn. According to Howard Fast, Ford handed Webb a copy of Fast's novel, falsely stating it was public domain. When Columbia Pictures received a copy of Webb's script, they filed a plagiarism suit against Warner Bros. Both studios settled out of court, with Warner Bros. paying Columbia an undisclosed settlement. Regardless, the film ultimately took its plot and title from Mari Sandoz's Cheyenne Autumn, which Ford preferred due to its focus on the Cheyenne. Elements of Fast's novel remain in the finished film, namely the character of Captain Archer (called Murray in the book), the depiction of Secretary Carl Schurz and the Dodge City, Kansas scenes.

In July 1963, The New York Times reported its working title was The Long Flight and stated that Spencer Tracy, James Stewart, Richard Widmark and Carroll Baker had been assigned the principal roles. The production was to begin on October 1. Ford told the publication, "I've killed more Indians than anyone since Custer. This is their side." Tracy however backed out of the project, stating he did not like the script. Ford turned to his second choice, Edward G. Robinson. Stewart was cast as Wyatt Earp, in which Ford told the actor the sequence between him and Arthur Kennedy would be comic relief from the heavily dramatic storyline.

To portray the indigenous Cheyenne, Ford had wanted Anthony Quinn and Richard Boone to play Dull Knife and Little Wolf as well-known actors with some Indian ancestry. He also suggested Afro-Indigenous actor Woody Strode for a role. Evidently, Ford cast several Mexican and Italian actors, including Sal Mineo, Gilbert Roland, Ricardo Montalbán, and Dolores Del Rio as the principal tribal leaders.

Ford used Navajo people to portray the Cheyenne. Dialogue that is supposed to be in the "Cheyenne language" is actually Navajo. This made little difference to white audiences, but for Navajo communities the film became very popular because the Navajo actors were openly using ribald and crude language that had nothing to do with the film. For example, during the scene where the treaty is signed, the chief's solemn speech just pokes fun at the size of the colonel's penis. Some academics now consider this an important moment in the development of Native American identity because they are able to mock Hollywood's historical interpretation of the American West.

=== Filming ===
Principal photography began on September 23, 1963. Several weeks were spent filming in Monument Valley Tribal Park on the Arizona-Utah border, where Ford had filmed scenes for many of his earlier films, especially Stagecoach (1939) and The Searchers (1956). Parts of the film also were shot at the San Juan River at Mexican Hat, Professor Valley, Castle Valley, the Colorado River, Fisher Canyon, Arches in Utah and the Magma Arizona Railroad in Arizona.

The film was intended to have a 79-day filming schedule, but within a month, production had fallen five days behind. On November 22, 1963, Ford was in Moab, Utah filming the violent climax, where the character Little Wolf shoots Red Shirt. Ford then paused production after hearing news that U.S. President John F. Kennedy had been assassinated in Dallas, Texas. The morning after the assassination, Ford had nearby U.S. flags lowered at half-staff and before the production crew, he delivered a speech, commemorating the slain president and believing in the peaceful transition of power in the wake of the tragedy. Four additional establishing shots were filmed in Utah before the production departed for Burbank, California on November 24.

On November 26, 1963, interior scenes were filmed at the Warner Bros. studio backlot, where the Dodge City sequence was shot. The production then moved to Colorado on December 18, where three days were spent filming tundra scenes. There, Ford sprained his ankle and consumed so much codeine that he became incapacitated. Richard Widmark stepped in to direct. According to the Los Angeles Times, filming was expected to conclude on January 6, 1964.

=== Post-production ===
Ford's first cut ran 158 minutes, becoming Ford's longest work. Leading into its London film premiere, Warner Bros. mandated crucial cuts to the run time, specifically in the Fort Robinson massacre sequence, and altered the position of the intermission. The studio had wanted to remove the "Dodge City" sequence with James Stewart as Wyatt Earp and Arthur Kennedy as Doc Holliday, but Bernard Smith insisted it be left in. It was retained in the London premiere and reserved-seating engagements, but it was removed during the general release. Since its release, it has been argued that this comic episode, mostly unrelated to the rest of an otherwise serious movie, interrupts the flow of the story. It was later restored for the VHS and subsequent DVD releases.

== Release ==
Cheyenne Autumn held its world premiere in Cheyenne, Wyoming on October 15, 1964, notably the same day as the Leicester Square, London premiere at the Warner Theatre. Richard Widmark, Carroll Baker, Dolores Del Rio, Sal Mineo, Patrick Wayne, and John Woodenlegs, the chief of the North Cheyenne tribe, attended the London premiere. The official U.S. premiere was held at the RKO International Theatre in Denver, Colorado on December 15. It was followed by reserved-seating engagements in Los Angeles, Chicago, Houston, and New York during Christmastime.

== Reception ==
=== Box office ===
By January 1966, Cheyenne Autumn earned $3.5 million in anticipated box office rentals from the United States and Canada. It ultimately earned $6.3 million worldwide, in which it lost $5.7 million.

=== Critical reaction ===
Bosley Crowther for The New York Times praised the film highly, calling it "a beautiful and powerful motion picture that stunningly combines a profound and passionate story of mistreatment of American Indians with some of the most magnificent and energetic cavalry-and-Indian lore ever put upon the screen." He was disappointed, however, that after the humorous (if "superfluous") Dodge City sequence, "the picture does not rise again to its early integrity and authenticity", and the climax is "neither effective and convincing drama nor is it faithful to the novel". Whitney Williams of Variety disagreed, however, calling it "a rambling, episodic account" in which "the original premise of the Mari Sandoz novel is lost sight of in a wholesale insertion of extraneous incidents which bear little or no relation to the subject." The New Republic's Stanley Kauffmann wrote "the acting is bad, the dialogue trite and predictable, the pace funereal, the structure fragmented, the climaxes puny".

A review in Time magazine stated, "Cheyenne Autumn has everything it takes to make a great western epic, except greatness ... In this wayward, 3-hr. movie version, Director John Ford dehydrates history and tosses in some sappy ideas of his own. The worst of them asserts that the Indians were accompanied by a conscientious Quaker lass (Carroll Baker) obviously all done up to join a grand ole opry." Philip K. Scheuer of the Los Angeles Times felt the cinematography was "often magnificent" and noted the film was "more serious" than How the West Was Won. However, he was critical of the film's "unconscionably long" run time, and felt the Dodge City sequence was "out of place as an entr'acte". In a retrospective review, Richard Brody of The New Yorker cited the "rueful, elegiac grandeur of John Ford's final Western".

The September 1965 issue of MAD satirized it as "Cheyenne Awful."

The film is recognized by American Film Institute in these lists:

- 2008: AFI's 10 Top 10:
  - Nominated Western Film

== Accolades ==
Cheyenne Autumn was nominated for Academy Award for Best Cinematography – Color, but it lost to My Fair Lady. Gilbert Roland was nominated for a Golden Globe Award for Best Supporting Actor – Motion Picture, but lost to Edmond O'Brien in Seven Days in May (1964).

== Documentary short ==
Before the release of Cheyenne Autumn, a 19-minute documentary, Cheyenne Autumn Trail, was put into production. Narrated by James Stewart, the short featured clips from the feature, recounting the historical events depicted in the film, depicting memorials to Little Wolf and Dull Knife and presenting life on the reservation in 1964 for descendants of the Cheyenne who participated in the Northern Cheyenne Exodus. Cheyenne Autumn Trail is included as an extra feature on the Cheyenne Autumn DVD issued in 2006.

== See also ==
- List of American films of 1964

== Bibliography ==
- Bogdanovich, Peter (1978) [1967]. John Ford. Berkeley: University of California Press.
- Eyman, Scott (1999). Print the Legend: The Life and Times of John Ford. New York: Simon & Schuster. ISBN 0-684-81161-8.
- McBride, Joseph (2001). Searching for John Ford: A Life. New York: St. Martin's Press. ISBN 0-312-24232-8.
- Sinclair, Andrew (1979). John Ford. New York: Dial Press/J. Wade.
