= Henry W. Wessells Jr. =

American brigadier general (1846–1929)

Henry Walton Wessells Jr.
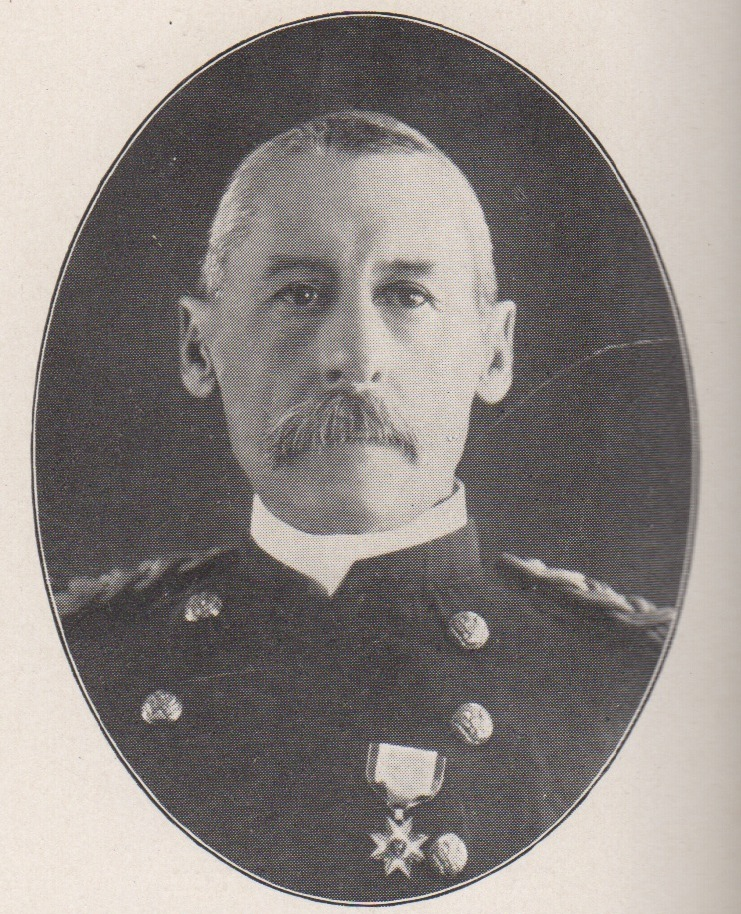
- Wessells in 1901
- Born: December 24, 1846; Sacketts Harbor, New York, U.S.
- Died: November 9, 1929 (aged 82); Location Unknown
- Burial place: Arlington National Cemetery, Virginia, U.S.
- Education: United States Naval Academy
- Spouse: Eliza Lane Meginnis
- Children: 1 (Henry W. Wessells III)
- Relatives: Henry W. Wessells (father)
- Military career
- Allegiance: United States
- Branch: United States Army
- Service years: 1865 – 1904
- Rank: Brigadier General
- Unit: 7th Infantry Regiment
- Commands: 3rd Cavalry Regiment
- Conflicts: American Civil War; American Indian Wars; Northern Cheyenne Exodus; Fort Robinson breakout (WIA); Spanish–American War; Battle of San Juan Hill; Philippine–American War

Henry Walton Wessells Jr. (1846–1929) was an American brigadier general of the American Indian Wars, the Spanish–American War and the Philippine–American War. He was known for being the son of Brigadier General Henry W. Wessells, his participation in the Fort Robinson breakout and his command of the 3rd Cavalry Regiment during the Battle of San Juan Hill.

== Early military career ==
Junior was born on December 24, 1846, at Sacketts Harbor, New York as the son of the renowned Henry W. Wessells Sr. and Hannah Cooper Wessells. He was educated at the Deep Hill Institute at Danbury, Connecticut and later enrolled in the United States Naval Academy from September 20, 1862, to November 12, 1864. He then participated in the American Civil War beginning on March 1, 1865, as a private within the 7th Infantry Regiment. He was later commissioned as a second lieutenant and a first lieutenant by July 21, 1865, and spent time in Florida enforcing Reconstruction policies. He also married Eliza Lane Meginnis on March 24, 1869.

== Service in Fort Robinson ==
Beginning on January 1, 1871, he was transferred to the 3rd Cavalry Regiment and was promoted to captain on December 20, 1872, and even managed to partially learn how to speak the Sioux language. When Wessells was stationed at Fort Robinson, he grew to be well acquainted with the Northern Cheyenne, notably with Morning Star and they grew to nickname him "Pose Hausha" (Long Nose). However, due to the events of the Dull Knife Fight, the Cheyenne were imprisoned at Fort Robinson and were being planned to being located to the south. After their initial refusal to do so however, Wessells cut off all supplies from the Northern Cheyenne in order to gain compliance from them but to no avail. Due to this, Wessells and other officers offered to let the Cheyenne women and children stay but they willingly chose to refuse.

On January 9, Wessells called for a council meeting with Morning Star along with 2 other chiefs, Wild Hog and Old Crow as he tried to sway them into his perspective. After they refused to head south however, Wessells gave orders for the arrest of Wild Hog and Old Crow with the latter managing to stab Private Thomas Ferguson in the sternum. This eventually culminated into the Fort Robinson breakout and after Wessells himself pleaded with the Cheyenne to lay down their aims, his response was met by gunfire and he ultimately led a charge against them but was wounded during the fighting. When the fighting concluded, Wessells had them buried in a mass grave known as "The Pit".

== Later career ==
On August 16, 1892, he was promoted to major and would be the commander of the regiment during the Spanish–American War, commanding the regiment during the Battle of San Juan Hill but was wounded during the battle. He was subsequently promoted to colonel on May 2, 1899, colonel of the 2nd Cavalry Regiment in February 1901. He briefly participated in the Philippine–American War but was discharged from service there due to poor health on February 2. He continued to remain in the United States Army and was promoted to brigadier general before retiring on April 23, 1904. He died on November 9, 1929, and was buried at the Arlington National Cemetery along with his wife, Eliza Lane Wessells (née Meginnis).
