= John Woodenlegs =

Native American leader (1909–1981)

- Vóóhéve

Northern Cheyenne leader

Personal details
- Born: 12 November 1909
- Died: December 1981 (aged 72) Billings, Montana, U.S.

John Woodenlegs (Cheyenne: Vóóhéve; 12 November 1909 – December 1981) was a Native American writer, educator, and the tribal president of the Northern Cheyenne from 1955 to 1968. In 1975, he founded Chief Dull Knife College, a community college located in Lame Deer, Montana.

Woodenlegs was the grandson of Wooden Leg, who fought against General George A. Custer's troops at the Battle of Little Big Horn in 1876. During his life, Woodenlegs also worked as a cowboy, road worker, coal miner and rancher. He was also the first American Indian to receive an honorary degree from the University of Montana.

Whitney Smith, a U.S. vexillologist, credited Woodenlegs with having designed the flag of the Northern Cheyenne, which was approved for display in 1964. In 1967, Woodenlegs was the sole American Indian member of the National Advisory Commission on Rural Poverty convened by President Lyndon B. Johnson.

He died in Billings, Montana a month past his 72nd birthday.

== Legacy ==
John Woodenlegs is a central figure in the 19-minute documentary Cheyenne Autumn Trail, produced in late 1964 to coincide with the October 3 world premiere in the Wyoming capital, Cheyenne, of John Ford's western epic, Cheyenne Autumn, which focuses upon the Northern Cheyenne Exodus of 1878–79 and features Chief Dull Knife as one of the lead characters.

In the documentary, narrated by James Stewart, Woodenlegs, in his capacity as president of the Northern Cheyenne Council, embarks on a recreational vehicle drive intended to retrace the historic Cheyenne Autumn Trail. Accompanying him is college-trained Williamette Youpee, Miss Indian America 1963 and twelve-year-old Richard Roundstone, an honor student at the reservation school.

In the course of their travels, Woodenlegs recounts how "the Cheyenne people were taken to Oklahoma and were getting sick and some of the younger people were dying and they wanted to go back to Montana... go back north fifteen hundred miles where they could live and hunt". When they stop at South Dakota's Bear Butte, a sacred place for generations of Cheyenne, Woodenlegs is heard explaining that "medicine men of the tribe, they go up to the mountain to offer prayers to the spirits before war... go up there and fast and ask the spirits... the good spirits... for the blessings." Cheyenne Autumn Trail is included as an extra feature on the Cheyenne Autumn DVD issued in 2006.

In her 2009 memoir, Going Rogue, Sarah Palin quotes Woodenlegs, but mistakenly attributes the quote to basketball coach John Wooden.
