= Robert Blalack =

American visual effects artist (1948–2022)

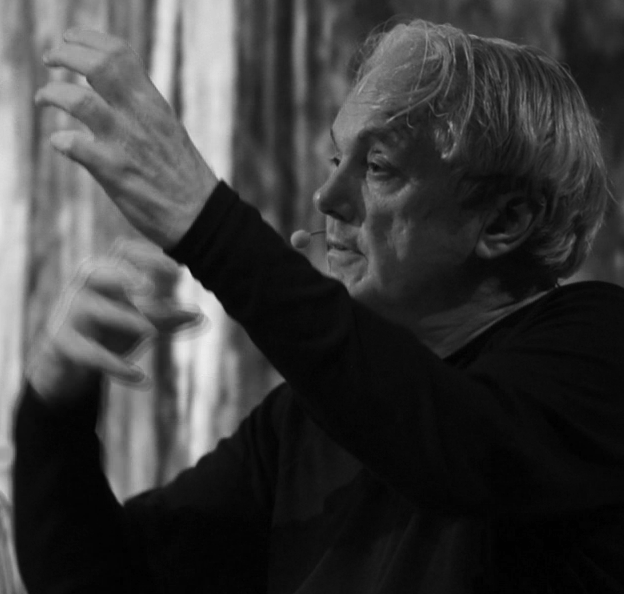
- Blalack delivering a multi-media conversation at the Cinémathèque française in 2015
- Born: December 9, 1948; Panama
- Died: February 2, 2022 (aged 73); Paris, France
- Education: Pomona College (BA); California Institute of the Arts (MFA)
- Occupations: Film director; producer; writer; visual effects supervisor
- Years active: 1969–2022
- Notable work: Star Wars - The Day After - Cosmos: A Personal Voyage.

Robert Blalack (December 9, 1948 – February 2, 2022) was a Panama-born American mass-media visual artist, independent filmmaker, and producer. He is one of the founders of Industrial Light & Magic. Blalack received the Academy Award for Best Visual Effects in 1978 for his work on the first Star Wars film. He also received the Primetime Emmy Award for Outstanding Special Visual Effects in 1984 for his work on the 1983 television film The Day After. Blalack directed experimental films and mixed-media television commercials, and he produced visual effects for theme park rides.

== Early life and education ==
Robert Blalack was born in Panama on December 9, 1948. He attended St. Paul's School in London before receiving a BA in English Literature and Theater Arts from Pomona College in Claremont, California. As the college did not have a film school, Blalack taught himself filmmaking by directing non-narrative experimental films using a second-hand 16mm Bolex camera.

After graduating from Pomona, he attended the California Institute of the Arts, receiving a Master of Fine Arts in Film Studies in 1973. While attending the Institute, he was a teaching assistant for Pat O'Neil, an experimental filmmaker. Meanwhile, he continued his work in experimental film before co-directing his first feature film, The Words (1973), with Professor Don Levy.

== Career ==
=== Early experimental films ===
- Over/Done (1970) 24 minutes
- If They Only Knew (1969) 20 minutes
- Navajo Mountain (1972) 36 minutes
- The Words (1973) 26 minutes

=== Early professional career ===
In 1973, Blalack worked night shifts at Crest Film Labs (later renamed Crest Digital), operating an optical printer making 35mm to 16mm TV negatives.

For Hearts And Minds (1974), Blalack animated director Peter Davis´s smuggled photographs of Con Son Island Tiger Cage prisoners. The film went on to receive an Academy Award recipient for Best Documentary Feature.

Blalack created a first-person subjective optical effects sequence designed to put the audience in the driver's seat of a Formula One race car for the film One By One (1975).

Blalack formed Praxis Film Works, Inc. during his work on One by One. After One By One, Blalack continued to produce optical effects for low-budget Hollywood movies and optical composites for high-end TV commercials.

In 1975, Blalack worked with the two leading visual effects innovators, Robert Abel and Douglas Trumbull. Trumbull commissioned Blalack to make a 16mm promo showcasing the creativity of Trumbull's visual effects studio, Future General. While making this documentary, Blalack met Trumbull's cameraman John Dykstra.

=== Star Wars (1975-77) ===
In June 1975, George Lucas chose John Dykstra to supervise the visual effects for Star Wars. Dykstra asked Blalack to help build the Star Wars VistaVision Visual Effects facility. As one of the founders of Industrial Light & Magic, Blalack's responsibility was to create crucial ILM VistaVision Photographic Optical Composite and Rotoscope Animation production pipelines that would mass-produce a record 365 VistaVision-to-35mm Panavision anamorphic visual effects composites.

No modern VistaVision photographic blue-screen pipeline existed when ILM was founded. The modest budget of Star Wars dictated that Blalack gather obsolete VistaVision optical composite equipment, modernize and debug each mechanical and optical component, devise methods to mass-produce 365 Visual Effects composites, design the Rotoscope Department, and then hire and train the Optical Composite and Rotoscope crew. Blalack supervised the design and fabrication of the world's first and only aerial image diffraction-limited VistaVision-to-35mm optical composite system. The Star Wars 365 VistaVision Visual Effects shots contained 1,250 original VistaVision color negative elements, from which more than 10,000 RGB black and white color Separations, mattes, and other intermediate VistaVision composite elements were generated. All of these VistaVision Visual Effects composite elements were photographed and composited during the final seven months of the Star Wars production.

At the Star Wars 40th anniversary, Blalack spoke to the assembled crew: "All of us changed the direction of filmmaking. Because of you, visions that were once completely impossible are now within reach. And you know, it wasn't always like that. We discovered that building ILM from scratch during production was like jumping out of a low-budget airplane, and stitching up a parachute during free-fall."

==== Star Wars Academy Award (1978) ====
Blalack received the 1978 Best Visual Effects Academy Award for his work on Star Wars.

=== Cosmos: A Personal Voyage ===
In 1980, Blalack produced visual effects for 12 of the 13 episodes of Carl Sagan's Cosmos: A Personal Voyage, in collaboration with the series producer Adrian Malone.

=== The Day After ===
In 1983, Blalack designed and produced The Day After visual effects. To determine what visual effects the movie needed, the Praxis team created storyboards to visualize the effects of nuclear detonations and their aftermath, and the missile contrails of US-launched ICBMs, from the perspective of the population of two cities in Kansas.

Praxis calculated that the number of angles and shots that would be required to simulate a nuclear bomb mushroom cloud on 35mm high-speed blue screen film would not be possible to produce within the modest production budget. Instead, Blalack decided to create both the nuclear bomb simulations and the missile contrails of US-launched ICBMs in a custom-built, computer-controlled water tank, where the interaction between the iconic mushroom cloud “cap” and “stem” could be separately controlled with precision.

==== The Day After Emmy (1984) ====
In 1984 Blalack received the Primetime Emmy Award for Outstanding Individual Achievement, Special Visual Effects for his work on The Day After.

=== Additional motion picture work ===
Blalack created and produced visual effects for many motion pictures, including:

- Blues Brothers (1980): Worked with director John Landis and producer Robert Weiss to design and produce the visual effects for the “Nazis Drive off the End of the Unfinished Freeway” sequence.
- Airplane! (1980): Produced the iconic opening sequence of the tail fin of a passenger jet swimming back and forth through clouds, set to the theme music from Jaws.
- Altered States (1980): Worked with director Ken Russell to design and produce special optical effects sequences simulating the psychedelic effects experienced by William Hurt's character.
- Wolfen (1981): Worked with Academy Award winner Michael Wadleigh to design and produce the “Wolf Vision” special visual effects. Wolf Vision incorporated multi-layered RGB color separation optical composites of the Wolfen POV cinematography shot by Steadicam inventor Garret Brown.
- Cat People (1982): Worked with director Paul Schrader to design and produce the cat vision of Natasha Kinski's character after she transforms into a black panther.
- Zu Warriors from the Magic Mountain (1983): Collaborated with filmmaker Tsui Hark to combine elements of Hong Kong action cinema with Western special effects technology.
- RoboCop (1987): Worked as a supervisor with director Paul Verhoeven and producer Jon Davison.

=== Theme park work ===
- Seafari (1994). Praxis Film Works, Inc. produced motion control miniature photography for Rhythm & Hues´s mixed-media theme park ride, with lighting by Visual Effects Oscar winner Alex Funke.
- Aliens: Ride at the Speed of Fright (1996). Praxis Film Works, Inc. provided motion control miniature photography for this Iwerks Entertainment location-based theme park ride, that explored visual themes from the movie Aliens.
- Akbar’s Adventure Tours – Busch Entertainment, Inc. (1998). Blalack directed live-action sequences in Marrakech, Morocco and Hollywood, California with Martin Short and Eugene Levy. Praxis Film Works, Inc. produced the visual effects.

=== Television commercial work ===
Blalack directed hundreds of multi-layered mixed-media USA and International TV commercials, produced by Praxis Film Works, Inc., for such clients as Cadillac, Chevrolet, Coca-Cola, Dodge, Hyundai, Kodak, Minolta, Panasonic, Papermate, Philip Morris, Union Carbide, Sharp, and 3M.

=== Independent motion pictures ===
The visionary experience, as described by Aldous Huxley (The Doors of Perception, Heaven and Hell, and Moksha) and others, was a lifelong interest for Blalack. He discovered his passion for film-making when he attended experimental movie programs that played on the Pomona College campus from time to time. There he experienced the work of Patrick O’Neil, among others. Blalack would go on to study with O’Neil at CalArts. He came to regard film as a means and medium to open the doors of perception. This interest in the visionary experience underpinned his experimental film work.

Blalack was in post-production on Daddy Dearest, a Praxis Film Works, Inc. production of his experimental 8K motion picture, at the time of his death. The film remains unfinished.

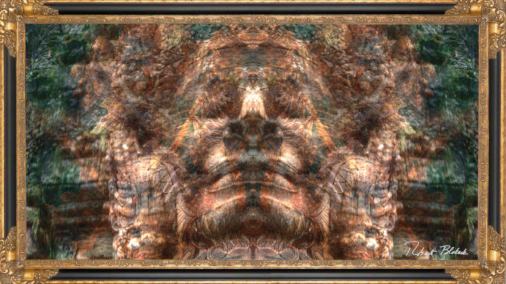
One of Blalack's Living Paintings

=== Artworks ===
Blalack created a series of "Living Paintings". These 10-hour, 4K, and 8K UHDTV pieces were synthesized from tens of thousands of photographs he took in the Jain temples of Northern India, the Hindu temples of Angkor Wat, the Buddhist temples of Sri Lanka and China, and the Catholic cathedrals of France between 2008 and 2017.

=== Multi-media conversations ===
Blalack gave multi-media talks at more than 70 universities, film schools, VFX schools, art schools, and film festivals in China, Germany, Austria, and France at the Cinematheque Francaise. He explored the design and realization of ILM from scratch for Star Wars, the impact of VFX on Hollywood studio creative choices, and strategies for aspiring movie workers to optimize their career paths and make use of today's merged media motion picture design and production opportunities.

== Death ==
Blalack died from cancer on February 2, 2022, at the age of 73.
