= Henry W. Wessells =

United States Army general (1809–1889)

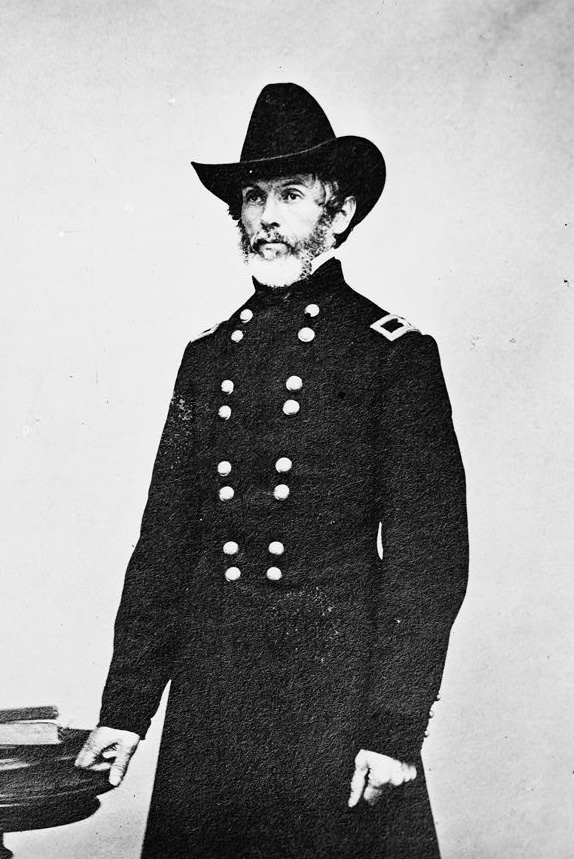
- Born: February 20, 1809; Litchfield, Connecticut, U.S.
- Died: January 12, 1889 (aged 79); Dover, Delaware, U.S.
- Burial place: East Cemetery, Litchfield, Connecticut, U.S.
- Military career
- Allegiance: United States (Union)
- Branch: United States Army (Union Army)
- Service years: 1833–1871
- Rank: Brigadier General
- Commands: 6th Infantry Regiment 8th Kansas Infantry Regiment; Division of the Albemarle 18th Infantry Regiment
- Conflicts: Second Seminole War; Mexican–American War; Siege of Veracruz; Battle of Cerro Gordo; Battle of Contreras; Battle of Churubusco; Sioux Wars; Battle of Ash Hollow; American Civil War; Peninsula campaign; Battle of Yorktown; Battle of Fair Oaks; Battle of Kinston; Battle of Goldsborough Bridge; Battle of Plymouth (POW)

Henry Walton Wessells (February 20, 1809 – January 12, 1889) was an American brigadier general, best known for his service during the American Civil War, including his surrender of Union fortifications during the Battle of Plymouth in 1864.

== Early life ==
Wessells was born in Litchfield, Connecticut, Feb. 20, 1809. After he was graduated at West Point in 1833 he took part in the Second Seminole War, first as a second lieutenant of infantry and then as first lieutenant, being promoted on July 7, 1838. In Gen. Scott's Mexican campaign he was promoted captain and received the brevet of major for gallantry at Contreras and Churubusco. In the former contest Capt. Wessells, though wounded, seized the regimental flag on the death of the color sergeant and put himself at the head of his men. On his return from the war the state of Connecticut voted him a jeweled sword, which was presented to him with military ceremonies.

From 1849 to 1853, Wessells was stationed in Benicia, California and from 1851 to 1853, he served as an escort to the Indian Commissioner. In December 1851, he served as a judge on the court martials of George H. Derby, the famous humorist, and Joseph Hooker, the assistant adjutant general of the Pacific Division in Sonoma, California. Capt. Wessells was on the Pacific coast until 1854, and was in the Sioux expedition of 1855, after which he served in the Northwest until the Civil War.

== American Civil War ==
On June 6, 1861, he was promoted major of the 6th US Infantry, and on Aug. 22 of that year he received the colonelcy of the 8th Kansas Infantry. After serving on the Missouri border, he resumed his commission in the regular army Feb. 15, 1862, and in March was transferred to the Army of the Potomac. He was made a brigadier-general of volunteers April 25 and served in the Peninsula, receiving the regular army brevet of lieutenant-colonel for gallantry at the Battle of Fair Oaks, where he was wounded. In Gen. George B. McClellan's change of base he commanded the rear guard, and then engaged in the defense of Suffolk, Virginia, afterward serving in North Carolina. After serving at Kinston, Goldsboro, and New Berne, he was placed over the sub-district of the Albemarle, taking command May 3, 1863. On April 17, 1864, he was attacked at Plymouth, North Carolina, where he had a garrison of about 3,000 men, by Gen. Robert F. Hoke with about 15,000 Confederate troops and the ironclad CSS Albemarle After a gallant defense which lasted three days, Gen. Wessells surrendered the town. He was taken to Libby Prison, whence he was transferred successively to Danville, Macon and Charleston. At the last-named place he was one of the officers that were placed under the fire of the Union batteries on Morris island. On August 3, 1864, he was exchanged, and on November 11 he became commissary of prisoners, which post he held until the close of the war. He was also placed in charge of a conscription center in New York. He was promoted lieutenant-colonel February 16, 1865, and brevetted colonel to date from April 20, 1864, "for gallant and meritorious services during the rebel attack on Plymouth, N. C." On March 13 he was given the regular army brevet of brigadier general.

== Later years ==
After the Civil War, Wessells served on the northwestern frontier as lieutenant-colonel of the 18th US Infantry until Jan. 1, 1871, when he was retired. After that time he resided in Litchfield, but at the time of his death he was on a visit to Delaware. Gen. Wessells died in Dover, Delaware, Jan. 12, 1889. He was buried at East cemetery in Litchfield, Connecticut.

== Family ==
In September 1834, Wessells married Mary Griswold. She died in Florida in 1841, and he later married Hannah Cooper of Cooperstown, New York, a niece of James Fenimore Cooper. She died in 1863, and in 1878, Wessells married Caroline Wadsworth. With his first wife, Wessells had one child. With his second, he was the father of three.

Wessells' son Henry W. Wessells Jr. (1846–1929) was a career Army officer who served in the Spanish–American War and attained the rank of brigadier general.

== See also ==
- List of American Civil War generals (Union)
