= Jack Mills (set decorator) =

American set decorator

- Died: October 26, 1985
- Occupation: Set decorator
- Years active: 1947–1970

Jack Mills (died October 26, 1985) was an American set decorator. He was nominated for an Academy Award in the category Best Art Direction for the film How the West Was Won.

== Selected filmography ==
- The Lusty Men (1952)
- How the West Was Won (1962)
- The Life and Legend of Wyatt Earp
