= A Year Toward Tomorrow =

1966 film

- Directed by: Edmond Levy
- Produced by: Edmond Levy; Carl V. Ragsdale
- Narrated by: Paul Newman
- Cinematography: Ross Lowell
- Production company: Sun Dial Films
- Distributed by: Office of Economic Opportunity
- Release date: 1966
- Running time: 25 minutes
- Country: United States
- Language: English

A Year Toward Tomorrow is a 1966 American short documentary film about the Volunteers in Service to America, directed by Edmond Levy.

== Cast ==
- Paul Newman as narrator

== Accolades ==
In 1967 it won an Oscar for Documentary Short Subject at the 39th Academy Awards.
