= 8th Kansas Infantry Regiment =

- Active: August 1861 – January 9, 1866
- Country: United States
- Allegiance: Union
- Branch: Infantry
- Engagements: Battle of Perryville; Battle of Stones River; Tullahoma Campaign; Battle of Chickamauga; Siege of Chattanooga; Battle of Missionary Ridge; Battle of Peachtree Creek; Siege of Atlanta; Battle of Jonesboro; Battle of Spring Hill; Battle of Franklin; Battle of Nashville

The 8th Kansas Infantry Regiment was an infantry regiment that served in the Union Army during the American Civil War.

== Service ==
Companies A, D, G, and H of the 8th Kansas Infantry were organized at Lawrence, Kansas; the remaining companies were recruited from across the state. Company A was the first to muster in on August 28, 1861. The regiment mustered in under the command of Colonel Henry W. Wessells.

The regiment was attached to 2nd Brigade, 4th Division, Army of the Mississippi, to September 1862. 32nd Brigade, 9th Division, Army of the Ohio, to October 1862. 32nd Brigade, 9th Division, III Corps, Army of the Ohio, to November 1862. 3rd Brigade, 1st Division, Right Wing, XIV Corps, Department of the Cumberland, to January 1863. Post of Nashville, Department of the Cumberland, to June 1863. 3rd Brigade, 1st Division, XX Corps, Army of the Cumberland, to October 1863. 1st Brigade, 3rd Division, IV Corps, Army of the Cumberland, to August 1865. Department of Texas to November 1865.

The 8th Kansas Infantry mustered out of service at Fort Leavenworth, Kansas, on January 9, 1866.

== Detailed service ==
Companies A, D, G, and H at Lawrence, Kansas, October 1861. Companies A and G marched to West Point, Missouri, December 16–19, and Companies D and H, to the same place November 23–25, 1861. Companies A, F, and G moved to Fort Kearney, Nebraska, February 16, 1862. Companies D, H, and K to Osawatomie, Kansas, February 22, then to Fort Leavenworth March 12. Companies A, D, and G at Fort Kearney, Nebraska. Companies B and F at Fort Leavenworth, Kansas. Company C at Fort Riley until April, then at Fort Leavenworth, Kansas. Companies E and K at Aubrey, Kansas. Company H at Fort Leavenworth, Kansas, until April, then at Fort Riley, and Company I at Leavenworth City. All until May 1862. Companies B, E, H, I, and K moved from Leavenworth to Columbus, Kentucky, May 28-June 2, and to Union City, Tennessee, June 8–11. To Trenton, Tennessee, June 16–17. To Humboldt, Tennessee, June 26, and to Corinth, Mississippi, July 2–3. Companies B, E, H, I, and K moved from Corinth, Mississippi, to Jacinto July 22, 1862, and to Eastport, Mississippi, August 3–5. March to Nashville, Tennessee, August 18-September 4, then to Louisville, Kentucky, in pursuit of Bragg September 11–26. Pursuit of Bragg into Kentucky October 1–16. Near Perryville October 6–7. Battle of Perryville October 8. Lancaster October 14. March to Nashville, Tennessee, October 16-November 7. Reconnaissance toward Franklin December 9. Near Brentwood December 9. Assigned to provost duty at Nashville December 18, 1862, to June 9, 1863. Company G stationed at Leavenworth until February 1863. Joined regiment at Nashville, Tennessee, March 29, 1863. Companies A, D, and F at Fort Kearney until June 1862, then at Leavenworth, Kansas, until February 1863. Company C at Leavenworth, Kansas, until February 1863. Skirmish with Gordon's guerrillas at Hickory Grove, Missouri, August 7, 1862 (Companies A, D, and F). Scout from Fort Leavenworth to Independence, Missouri, August 12–14, 1862 (Companies A and F). Hickory Grove August 23 (Companies A, C, and F). Expedition through Jasper, Cass, Johnson, and LaFayette Counties, Missouri, September 8–23 (Companies C and F). Companies A, C, D, and F joined Regiment at Nashville, Tennessee, February 22, 1863. Regiment moved from Nashville to Murfreesboro, Tennessee, June 9, 1863. Tullahoma Campaign June 23-July 7. Liberty Gap June 24–27. Passage of Cumberland Mountains and Tennessee River, and Chickamauga Campaign August 16-September 22. Caperton's Ferry, Bridgeport, August 29. Battle of Chickamauga, September 19–20. Siege of Chattanooga September 24-October 27. Battles of Chattanooga November 23–25; Orchard Knob November 23–24; Missionary Ridge November 26. Pursuit to Graysville November 26–27. March to relief of Knoxville, November 28-December 8. Campaign in eastern Tennessee until February 1864. Veterans on furlough February 17-April 5. Moved to Nashville, Tennessee, April 20–28. Escort train from Nashville to Sherman's army May 1 to June 17. Rejoined Brigade before Kennesaw Mountain June 28. Operations against Kennesaw Mountain June 28-July 2. Ruff's Station, Smyrna Camp Ground, July 4. Chattahoochie River July 5–17. Battle of Peachtree Creek July 19–20. Siege of Atlanta July 22-August 25. Flank movement on Jonesboro August 25–30. Battle of Jonesboro August 31-September 1. Lovejoy's Station September 2–6. Operations against Hood in northern Georgia and northern Alabama October 1–26. Moved to Nashville, then to Pulaski, Tenn. Nashville Campaign November–December. Columbia, Duck River, November 24–27. Spring Hill November 29. Battle of Franklin November 30. Battles of Nashville December 15–16. Pursuit of Hood to the Tennessee River December 17–28. March to Huntsville, Alabama, December 1, 1864, to January 5, 1865, duty there until February 1. Moved to Nashville and back to Huntsville February 1–6, and duty there until March 15. Bull's Gap Expedition and operations in eastern Tennessee March 15-April 22. Moved to Nashville April 22 and duty there until June 15. Moved to New Orleans, Louisiana, June 15–29, thence to Indianola, Texas, July 6–9. March to Green Lake July 9, and duty there until August 10. Moved to San Antonio August 10–23, and duty there until November 29. Mustered out November 29, 1865. Moved to Fort Leavenworth, Kansas, November 30, 1865 – January 6, 1866, and honorably discharged January 9, 1866.

== Casualties ==
The regiment lost a total of 244 men during service; 3 officers and 94 enlisted men killed or mortally wounded, 3 officers and 144 enlisted men died of disease.

== Commanders ==
- Colonel Henry W. Wessels
- Colonel John Alexander Martin
- Lieutenant Colonel James L. Abernathy
- Lieutenant Colonel John Conover

== Notable members ==
- Captain John L. Graham, Company D - Namesake of Graham County, Kansas, killed at the Battle of Chickamauga September 19, 1863
- Colonel John Alexander Martin - 10th Governor of Kansas, 1885-1889
- Captain Edgar P. Trego, Company H - Namesake of Trego County, Kansas, killed at the Battle of Chickamauga, September 19, 1863

== See also ==
- List of Kansas Civil War Units
- Kansas in the Civil War
