= Fort Robinson breakout =

Battle and massacre that occurred in Fort Robinson, Nebraska

Fort Robinson outbreak
- Part of the Northern Cheyenne Exodus
- "The Pit". Painting by Frederic Remington, 1897
Date	January 9 – 22, 1879
Location	Fort Robinson, Nebraska, United States
Result	United States Victory

Belligerents
Northern Cheyenne	United States

Commanders and leaders
Dull Knife; Little Finger Nail †; Left Hand †; Tangle Hair	(United States) Andrew W. Evans (United States) Henry W. Wessells (United States) Peter D. Vroom (United States) John B. Johnson

Strength
149, including 46 warriors	~175 soldiers plus a few armed civilians

Casualties and losses
~60 killed, ~70 captured	12 killed, 14 wounded

The Fort Robinson breakout or Fort Robinson massacre was the attempted escape of Cheyenne captives from the U.S. army during the winter of 1878–1879 at Fort Robinson in northwestern Nebraska. In 1877, the Cheyenne had been forced to relocate from their homelands on the northern Great Plains south to the Darlington Agency on the Southern Cheyenne Reservation in Indian Territory (Oklahoma). In September 1878, in what is called the Northern Cheyenne Exodus, 353 Northern Cheyenne fled north because of poor conditions on the reservation. In Nebraska, the U.S. Army captured 149 of the Cheyenne, including 46 warriors, and escorted them to Fort Robinson.

In January 1879, after the Cheyenne had refused an earlier order to return to the south, the soldiers began to treat them harshly to try to force them south. They were confined to a barracks without food, water, or wood for heat. Most of the band escaped the barracks on January 9, but the US Army hunted them down. The Cheyenne were poorly armed and outnumbered by 175 soldiers pursuing them. On January 22, the army surrounded and killed most of the last 37 escapees. In total, the army recaptured about 70 of the Cheyenne and killed about 60. A few escaped, including Dull Knife, the Cheyenne leader. Eleven soldiers and one Indian scout were killed by the Cheyenne.

== Background and surrender ==
In 1877 the Dull Knife and Little Wolf bands of the Northern Cheyenne surrendered to the U.S. at Fort Robinson, Nebraska. Almost one thousand Cheyenne were escorted by soldiers south to the Southern Cheyenne reservation in Indian Territory, later Oklahoma. Conditions were difficult with shortages of food and outbreaks of measles and malaria. Dull Knife and Little Wolf pleaded to be allowed to return to the northern Great Plains but were turned down. In September 1878, the two leaders and 351 of their followers fled the reservation with the objective of journeying to rejoin other groups of Northern Cheyenne who resided mostly in Montana. Ninety-two of those fleeing the reservation were warriors; the remainder were women, children, and elderly.

During their flight northward the Cheyenne were successful in several fights with the U.S. Army and civilian volunteers. They raided white settlers for horses and provisions, killing about 40 civilians, and having several of their women, children, and elderly captured and executed by whites. In the Sandhills of Nebraska the Cheyenne split into two groups. Little Wolf wished to join the Northern Cheyenne in Montana. He and his followers evaded capture, arrived safely in Montana, and were allowed to stay there. Dull Knife wanted to join the Sioux at the Red Cloud Agency near Fort Robinson, Nebraska (unbeknownst to him the agency and the Sioux had moved to South Dakota). On 23 October, during a blinding snowstorm, Dull Knife's band of 149 persons, after 44 days and more than 1,000 km (620 miles) of travel since leaving the reservation in Oklahoma, encountered by chance two companies of U.S. cavalry, about 100 soldiers, commanded by Captain John B. Johnson. In bitterly cold weather, Johnson and Dull Knife met and avoided hostilities. The soldiers gave food and blankets to the Cheyenne who were "ragged and dirty...with poor moccasins, bad bed quilts or some thin sheet-like cloth for blankets." More soldiers arrived and soon the Cheyenne were surrounded by more than 300 soldiers with artillery. The soldiers captured their horses. After negotiations, the Cheyenne surrendered and were escorted to Fort Robinson, arriving on 26 October. The Cheyenne surrendered some of their guns, but disassembled others and hid them in their clothing.

== Fort Robinson ==
On arrival at Fort Robinson, the Cheyenne captives were fed and counted. Dull Knife's band consisted of 46 men, 42 women, and 61 children. Thirty of the men were deemed capable of fighting. Many of the Cheyenne were ill and near-starvation. An army doctor provided them with medical care. The soldiers searched the Cheyenne and found about 10 additional guns they had not turned in when they surrendered. They were housed in a barracks. Initially the Cheyenne were allowed freedom of movement around and near the camp, but were required to return to the barracks by nightfall. Army officers organized dances with the Cheyenne women.

Dull Knife had told the soldiers that the Cheyenne wished to remain in the north and join the Sioux in South Dakota during the surrender negotiations and in his initial talks with Major Caleb Carlton, commander of Fort Robinson. Carlton and others had told him that it was undecided whether the Cheyenne could remain or would be required to return to Indian territory. However, little consideration was given by the U.S. government to allowing the Cheyenne to remain. General Phillip Sheridan said the whole reservation system...will be endangered unless every one of these Indians are taken back and made to stay." On 22 November 1878, Secretary of the Department of Interior (which managed Indian affairs) Carl Schurz agreed that the Cheyenne should be returned. In December, Sheridan turned down General George Crook's request that the return of the Cheyenne to Indian territory be postponed until spring. In an effort to persuade the Cheyenne to return south, the army brought Sioux leader Red Cloud to Fort Robinson to try to persuade the Cheyenne to return to the south. The U.S. began to tighten rules of imprisonment of the Cheyenne. Late in November, Bull Hump, Dull Knife's son, had borrowed a horse and left to visit relatives living with the Sioux. In response, the Army withdrew privileges and thereafter confined the Cheyenne to the barracks.

On 4 December Captain Henry W. Wessells Jr. took command of Fort Robinson, replacing Carlton. About 175 soldiers were stationed at the fort. Wessells intensified the pressure on the Cheyenne, forcing the women to work outside in bitterly cold weather and increasing the number of guards on the barracks where the Cheyenne were housed. Wessells also telegraphed General Crook requesting food and winter clothing for the Cheyenne. Soldiers said the Cheyenne "were in rags." Wessells protested orders to handcuff the Cheyenne men when they were to be moved.

== Breakout ==
On 3 January 1879, Wessells informed the leaders of the Cheyenne that they were ordered to return south to the Southern Cheyenne reservation in Indian Territory. The chiefs refused to leave. The next day, Wessells confined all the Cheyenne to the barracks and cut off food and water to force their compliance. The Cheyenne survived with a little food they had stored and drank the frost they could scrape off the windows and walls. On 9 January Wessells arrested Wild Hog and Old Crow, two Cheyenne leaders, and shackled them in irons. Their families were also taken out of the barracks, leaving about 130 Cheyenne still there. During their arrest, Wild Hog stabbed one of the soldiers and he and his wife attempted suicide by stabbing themselves. The two leaders and their families remained imprisoned during the breakout.

On 9 January, six inches of snow was on the ground. That evening the Cheyenne in the barracks retrieved 16 guns they had hidden and sang their death songs. At about 10 p.m., warriors climbed out through the windows of the barracks and killed two guards. The rest of the Cheyenne fled the barracks and five warriors fought a rear guard action against soldiers pursuing them. All of the five warriors were killed. The Cheyenne fled west, attempting to reach limestone bluffs and Soldier Creek four miles distant. At the creek, they broke the ice for water to drink, Doing the pursuit that night and the following day, about 27 of the Cheyenne were killed, including a daughter of Dull Knife (whose body was mutilated), and 35 were recaptured. On reaching the bluffs, the Cheyenne separated into smaller groups.

Over the following days, the soldiers and a few civilians continued to pursue the fleeing Cheyenne. A few were captured, others were killed or died of exposure. The Cheyenne's only food was dead cavalry horses, but the soldiers burned dead horses to deprive them of food. On 22 January the soldiers found the largest group of surviving Cheyenne, 37 persons, 60 km (37 miles) northwest of Fort Robinson on Antelope Creek in the northwestern corner of Nebraska. This group of Cheyenne were attempting to reach the Sioux in South Dakota. Wessells pleaded with the Cheyenne to surrender. They responded with gunfire, killing three soldiers. Wessells mounted a charge on the Cheyenne, who were in a buffalo wallow surrounded by an improvised breastwork. The soldiers made it to the breastwork and fired down into the buffalo wallow. When firing ceased, 28 Cheyenne were dead or dying. Nine survived, all women and children. Wessells was himself wounded in the operation. The dead were buried in a mass grave called "The Pit."

Estimates differ regarding Cheyenne killed and recaptured during the breakout. Sixty killed and 70 recaptured (including 18 who were imprisoned and unable to escape at the time of the breakout) is a credible estimate with about 20 unaccounted for who escaped or died from the cold. Dull Knife and some of his family were among those who escaped. He fled eastward instead of west as did the others, found refuge with a white friend in South Dakota, and was hidden by the Sioux on their reservation. Eleven soldiers and one Indian scout were killed by the Cheyenne during the breakout.

=== Cheyenne killed ===
- Left Hand (January 9)
- White Antelope (January 9)
- Sitting Man (January 9)
- Black Bear (January 22)
- Little Finger Nail (January 22)

=== Cheyenne wounded ===
- Tangle Hair (Wounded and Captured, January 9)

=== U.S. killed ===
- Private Frank Schmidt, Company A, 3rd Cavalry (January 9)
- Private Peter Hulse, Company A, 3rd Cavalry (January 9)
- Private W. H. Good, Company L, 3rd Cavalry (January)
- Private W. W. Everett, Company H, 3rd Cavalry (January)
- Corporal Henry P. Orr, Company A, 3rd Cavalry (January)
- Private Bernard Kelly, Company E, 3rd Cavalry (January)
- Private Amos J. Barbour, Company, 3rd Cavalry (January)
- Farrier George Brown, Company A, 3rd Cavalry (January 22)
- Sergeant James Taggart, Company A, 3rd Cavalry (January 22)
- Private George Nelson, Company A, 3rd Cavalry (January 22)
- Private Henry A. DuBlois, Company H, 3rd Cavalry (January 22)
- Woman's Clothes, Indian Scout, mortally wounded (January 22)

=== U.S. wounded ===
- Captain Henry W. Wessells Jr., Company H, 3rd Cavalry (January 22)
- First Sergeant Ambrose, Company E, 3rd Cavalry (January 22)
- Sergeant Read, Company H, 3rd Cavalry (January 22)

== Aftermath ==
General George Crook sent a board of officers to investigate the massacre at Fort Robinson. This group consisted of Major Andrew W. Evans, 3rd Cavalry; Captain John M. Hamilton, 5th Cavalry; and First Lieutenant Walter S. Schuyler, of Company B, 5th Cavalry (Schuyler was the Aide-de-camp of Crook). Major Evans arrived at Robinson from Fort Laramie on January 19 and took command of the garrison. Dull Knife reached Pine Ridge Agency, Dakota Territory, where Red Cloud was being held as a prisoner. After months of delay from Washington, the prisoners from Fort Robinson, including Dull Knife, were released and allowed to go to Fort Keogh, Montana Territory to join Little Wolf, where they settled on a nearby reservation.

Seven of the surviving warriors were charged and tried for murders committed in Kansas during their exodus north. They were acquitted. In 1901 the U.S. Supreme Court denied any U.S. liability but called the "shocking story" "one of the most melancholy of Indian tragedies" and found that "up to the time these Cheyennes were fired upon in the Indian Territory by the pursuing troops, they had committed no atrocity and were in amity with the United States and desired to remain so."

In 1994 the Northern Cheyenne reclaimed the remains of those killed and buried in Nebraska. They were reinterred on the Northern Cheyenne Indian Reservation, on a hill overlooking Busby, Montana.

== US officers involved ==
- Major Andrew W. Evans, 3rd Cavalry, Investigating Board of Officers, arrived January 19 from Fort Laramie
- Captain Henry W. Wessells Jr., Company H, 3rd Cavalry (Wounded)
- Captain John B. Johnson, Company B, 3rd Cavalry
- Captain Joseph Lawson, Company E, 3rd Cavalry
- Captain Peter Dumont Vroom, Company L, 3rd Cavalry
- Captain John M. Hamilton, 5th Cavalry, Investigating Board of Officers
- First Lieutenant Walter S. Schuyler, Company B, 5th Cavalry, Investigating, Aide-de-camp to General Crook
- Assistant Surgeon (First Lieutenant) Edward R. Mosely, Medical Detachment, Department of the Platte
- Acting Assistant Surgeon Charles V. Petteys, Medical Detachment, Department of the Platte
- Second Lieutenant Joseph F. Cummings, Company C, 3rd Cavalry
- Second Lieutenant Thompson, Company D, 3rd Cavalry
- Second Lieutenant John Baxter, 9th Infantry (Company F, 3rd Cavalry)
- Second Lieutenant F. H. Hardee, Company F, 3rd Cavalry
- Second Lieutenant George Francis Chase, Company L, 3rd Cavalry

== Order of battle ==
Native Americans, Chief Dull Knife 149 people, including 46 men.

Native Americans	Tribe	Leaders
Native Americans	Northern Cheyenne	Dull Knife; Left Hand †; Little Finger Nail †; Tangle Hair (Wounded in action and Captured); Black Bear †; White Antelope †; Sitting Man †

United States Army, Fort Robinson, Nebraska, January 9–22, 1879, Captain Henry W. Wessells Jr., commanding until January 19. Major Andrew W. Evans, commanding from January 19–22, 1879.

Fort Robinson garrison	Regiment	Companies and Others
Captain Henry W. Wessells, January 9–19, Major Andrew W. Evans, January 19–22, 1879	3rd United States Cavalry Regiment	Company A: Second Lieutenant George F. Chase; Company B: Captain John B. Johnson; Company C: Second Lieutenant Joseph F. Cummings; Company D: Second Lieutenant Thompson; Company E: Captain Joseph Lawson; Company F: Second Lieutenant John Baxter, Second Lieutenant Hardee; Company H: Captain Henry W. Wessells Jr.; Company L: Captain Peter D. Vroom
Captain Henry W. Wessells, January 9–19, Major Andrew W. Evans, January 19–22, 1879	Scouts, Guides, Unattached Soldiers, and Civilians	Assistant Surgeon (First Lieutenant) Edward R. Mosely, Medical Detachment; Acting Assistant Surgeon Charles V. Petteys, Medical Detachment; First Lieutenant Walter S. Schuyler, Company B, 5th Cavalry, Aide-de-camp to General George Crook; John Shangrau, scout; Edgar Beecher Bronson, cattleman; Mr. Dear, trader; Mr. Clifford, trader

== Popular culture ==
The incident is portrayed in a sympathetic light to the Cheyenne in the John Ford movie Cheyenne Autumn, with some differences from the actual events. Karl Malden portrays Captain Wessells.
