= Don Greenwood Jr. =

American set decorator (1928–1990)

- Born: September 26, 1928; California, USA
- Died: June 27, 1990 (aged 61); Los Angeles, California, USA
- Occupation: Set decorator
- Years active: 1958-1986

Don Greenwood Jr. (September 26, 1928 – June 27, 1990) was an American set decorator. He was nominated for an Academy Award in the category Best Art Direction for the film How the West Was Won.

== Selected filmography ==
- How the West Was Won (1962)
