= Bernard Smith (editor) =

American literary editor and film producer

- Born: September 20, 1907; New York City, U.S.
- Died: December 21, 1999 (aged 92); Beverly Hills, California, U.S.
- Education: City University of New York
- Occupations: Literary editor, film producer
- Relatives: Emil L. Smith (brother)

Bernard Smith (September 20, 1907 – December 21, 1999) was an American literary editor, film producer, and literary critic. He is best remembered for his work at the Knopf publishing house, where he edited B. Traven, Raymond Chandler, and Dashiell Hammett, and Langston Hughes.

== Early life ==
Bernard Smith was born on September 20, 1907, in New York City. His father was a businessman and his mother was a housewife. He attended City University of New York.

== Career ==
In 1928, Smith began working for Alfred A. Knopf, where he was eventually made simultaneously editor-in-chief and managing editor. He became Traven's first American editor, and took a free hand in revising Traven's initially rough English.

In 1939, Smith published his Forces in American Criticism, a historical and critical survey of American literature and literary criticism from a Marxist perspective. Smith, though never a Communist Party member, was a committed Marxist; but the book was undogmatic and was well received in the mainstream literary academy, including favorable notice from critics such as Austin Warren. He collaborated with Malcolm Cowley while working for the New Republic in his early 20s.

Smith moved in 1947 to Hollywood, where he worked in the film industry, first for Samuel Goldwyn as a script editor. In 1950, he became an independent producer, producing such Hollywood films such as Elmer Gantry and How the West was Won. In 1963 he partnered as a producer with director John Ford, making films such as Cheyenne Autumn.

In 1994 Smith published a memoir, A World Remembered: 1925-1950, which has been used academically as an autobiography supporting historical texts. He edited volumes including The Democratic Spirit: A Collection of American Writings From the Earliest Times to the Present Day (1941, second edition 1943), Books That Changed Our Minds, and The Holiday Reader with Philip Van Doren Stern. His work also included studies published in the 1940s of the painters Moses Soyer and David Burliuk.

== Personal life ==
Smith's brother, Emil Smith was a biologist and UCLA professor emeritus credited with having his work with plasma. Emil is survived by his two sons, Geoffrey Smith, a Harvard graduate and current doctor at UCLA "UCLA Health: Center for High Quality Health Care Services". Archived from the original on 2014-11-29. and J. Donald Smith (Columbia, University of Chicago, Dartmouth, New England Gilbert and Sullivan Society)

== Death ==
Smith died on December 21, 1999, at the Beverly Hills Rehabilitation Center in Beverly Hills, California.

== Filmography ==
- Immortal Gentleman (1935, producer).
- Men Without Honour (1939, producer).
- Elmer Gantry (1960, producer).
- How the West Was Won (1962, producer).
- Cheyenne Autumn (1964, producer).
- 7 Women (1966, producer).
- Alfred the Great (1969, producer).
