= Ross Lowell =

Ross Kohut Lowell
- Lowell shooting a scene for Oh Brother, My Brother (1979)
- Born: Ross Kohut Levy; July 10, 1926; New York City, New York, US
- Died: January 10, 2019 (aged 92); Pound Ridge, New York
- Occupations: Inventor, photographer, cinematographer, lighting designer, author, entrepreneur
- Known for: Founder of Lowel-Light; Inventor of quick-clamp lighting mount; Inventor of gaffer tape
- Children: 4

Ross Kohut Lowell (July 10, 1926 – January 10, 2019) was an American inventor, photographer, cinematographer, lighting designer, author and entrepreneur who changed the film production industry with two inventions: a widely used quick-clamp lighting mount system, and gaffer tape. He founded Lowel-Light, a manufacturer of highly portable lighting equipment used in TV, film and stage lighting, with 20 patents filed by Lowell. Lowell was the cinematographer for the Academy Award-winning short A Year Toward Tomorrow (1966), and he won an Academy Award for Technical Achievement in 1980 for his compact lighting system. The same year, he was nominated for Best Short Film, Live Action for his 14-minute film Oh Brother, My Brother (1979), depicting two of his young children. In 1987 Lowell was awarded the John Grierson Gold Medal by the Society of Motion Picture and Television Engineers (SMPTE), "in recognition of his many achievements, inventions, and innovative developments in the field of lightweight lighting and of grip equipment."

Lowell worked on hundreds of documentaries, short films and television commercials. From 1972 he taught stage lighting at New York University and various professional seminars, and in 1992 he wrote a book about lighting, Matters of Light and Depth.

== Early career ==
Lowell was born in 1926 in New York City to Leo and Juliet Lowell. He joined the United States Navy to serve during and after World War II as a military photographer (1945–1946). He studied filmmaking at the University of California, Los Angeles, starting in 1948, then at the University of South Carolina in 1949. In 1955, Lowell was a student at a summer workshop at Haystack Mountain School of Crafts; his photographs from that time illustrate the 2019 book In the Vanguard: Haystack Mountain School of Crafts, 1950-1969. Lowell worked in the film and television industries as a cameraman, lighting director and cinematographer.

== Lowel-Light ==
In 1957–1958, CBS documentary filmmaker Stephen E. Fleischman was producing an episode for Walter Cronkite's The 20th Century television series. The episode, titled "The Delinquents: The Highfields Story" (1959), included many scenes shot at Highfields, the former Lindbergh estate in New Jersey, where an experimental program was underway to rehabilitate juvenile delinquents. Fleischman hired Lowell to install a temporary and unobtrusive lighting system at Highfields, one which would stay in place for a few weeks of filming. Lowell invented a swiveling ball-and-clamp system for mounting lights, and he reworked Johnson & Johnson's Permacel duct tape product by combining the Permacel adhesive with a silver fabric backing to create gaffer tape which could hold a flat metal plate to a window. A ball joint attached to the plate could mount a small portable floodlight fixture. The gaffer tape would resist heat and stay in place for months without leaving a residue when removed.

The "Delinquents" episode aired in January 1959, and Lowell started the Lowel-Light company later that year. Lowel-Light manufactured and sold the compact lighting solutions he had developed. The company was based out of his Stamford, Connecticut, home in the early days. The first products used high-intensity light bulbs which did not last very long, and there were few accessories. Over time, Lowel-Light introduced more accessories to create a portable lighting system for location photography. A 1983 issue of the magazine Industrial Photography declared, "When Ross Lowell invented the original Lowel-light, he probably didn't have any idea that his small light would have such a big influence on the working habits of both still and film workers."

== Lighting book ==
In 1992, Lowell produced the instructional book Matters of Light and Depth: Creating Memorable Images for Video, Film and Stills Through Lighting, published by Broad Street Books of Philadelphia. The book, composed of topical essays organized into eight chapters, was recommended by photography lighting expert Jon Falk before it came out. John Jackman, in his 2004 lighting book Lighting for Digital Video and Television, cites Lowell's book as a "classic" of the trade, and quotes Lowell: "It is all too easy to confuse effects with effective lighting, startling images with unforgettable ones, quantity of foot-candles with quality of light."

== Still photography ==
Lowell's still photography work was exhibited twice in 2010. In May, his series titled "Time Trails" was shown at Pound Ridge Library. Five months later, a series of his works was shown outdoors at Ward Pound Ridge Reservation in New York, the exhibit titled "Forest of Possibilities". The 24 images, each enlarged to about 30 sq ft (2.8 m^{2}) and printed by National Geographic Imaging, were hung from trees in the forest of the nature preserve.

== Personal life ==
Lowell was married four times. His first wife was the former Anita Kregal; they were married for ten years and had a daughter, Lisa. Lowell's third wife, Carol, bore him three sons: Josh (b. 1972), Evan (b. 1976), and Brett (b. 1980). Ross and Carol Lowell produced the 1979 short film Oh Brother, My Brother depicting Josh and Evan.

On the "Acknowledgements & Dedications" page of his 1992 book, Lowell thanked New York flash photography author Jon Falk for introducing him to "publishers Ed Moran and Marilyn Shapiro of Broad Street Books." Lowell would later marry Marilyn.

In 2007 through their film company Big UP Productions, Josh and Brett produced a film about rock climbing titled King Lines, which won an Emmy for best sports documentary.

In 2019, Lowell's fourth wife Marilyn Shapiro-Lowell reported that he had died in Pound Ridge, New York, at the age of 92. He was survived by his four children, ten grandchildren, a sister and two nieces.
