= How the West Was Won (film) =

1962 American film

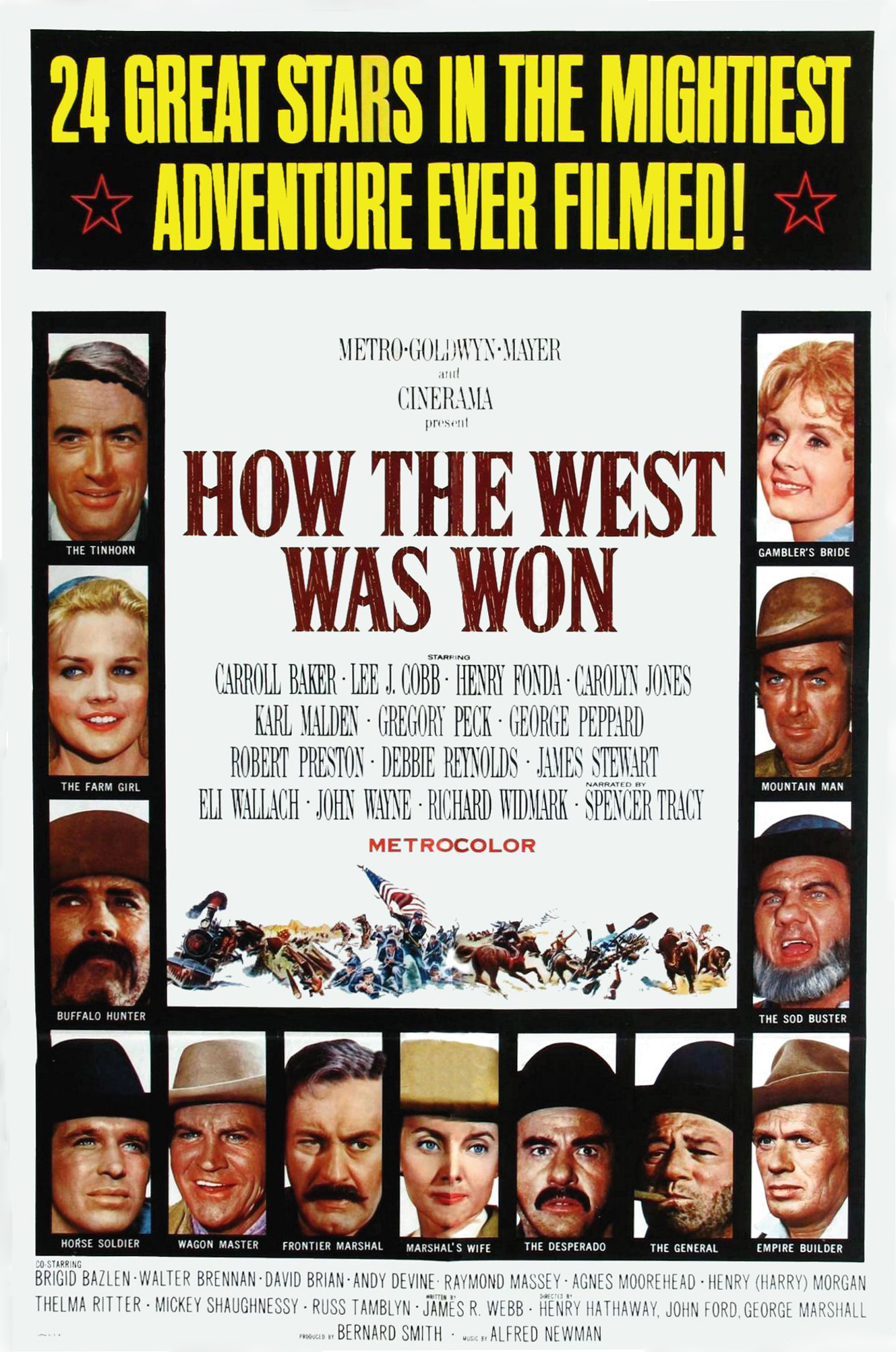
- Theatrical release poster by Reynold Brown
- Directed by: Henry Hathaway; John Ford; George Marshall
- Written by: James R. Webb
- Based on: "How the West Was Won"; 1959 article in Life
- Produced by: Bernard Smith
- Starring: Carroll Baker; Lee J. Cobb; Henry Fonda; Carolyn Jones; Karl Malden; Gregory Peck; George Peppard; Robert Preston; Debbie Reynolds; James Stewart; Eli Wallach; John Wayne; Richard Widmark; Brigid Bazlen; Walter Brennan; David Brian; Andy Devine; Raymond Massey; Agnes Moorehead; Henry (Harry) Morgan; Thelma Ritter; Mickey Shaughnessy; Russ Tamblyn
- Narrated by: Spencer Tracy
- Cinematography: William Daniels; Milton Krasner; Charles Lang; Joseph LaShelle
- Edited by: Harold F. Kress
- Music by: Alfred Newman
- Production companies: Metro-Goldwyn-Mayer; Cinerama
- Distributed by: Metro-Goldwyn-Mayer
- Release dates: November 1, 1962 (United Kingdom); February 20, 1963 (United States)
- Running time: 164 minutes
- Country: United States
- Language: English
- Budget: $14.4 million
- Box office: $50 million

How the West Was Won is a 1962 American epic Western film directed by Henry Hathaway (who directed three out of the five chapters: "The Rivers," "The Plains" and "The Outlaws"), John Ford ("The Civil War") and George Marshall ("The Railroad"), produced by Bernard Smith, written by James R. Webb, and narrated by Spencer Tracy. The film centers on a family and their descendants over the span of decades as they explore and settle the American frontier of the United States.

Originally filmed in true three-lens Cinerama with the accompanying three-panel panorama projected onto an enormous curved screen, the film features an ensemble cast formed by many cinema icons and newcomers, including (in alphabetical order) Carroll Baker, Lee J. Cobb, Henry Fonda, Carolyn Jones, Karl Malden, Gregory Peck, George Peppard, Robert Preston, Debbie Reynolds, James Stewart, Eli Wallach, John Wayne and Richard Widmark. The supporting cast features Brigid Bazlen, Walter Brennan, David Brian, Andy Devine, Raymond Massey, Agnes Moorehead, Harry Morgan, Thelma Ritter, Mickey Shaughnessy and Russ Tamblyn.

How the West Was Won is widely considered one of Hollywood's greatest epics. The film received widespread critical acclaim and was a box office success, grossing $50 million on a budget of $15 million. At the 36th Academy Awards it earned eight nominations, including Best Picture, and won three, for Best Story and Screenplay Written Directly for the Screen, Best Sound and Best Film Editing. In 1997, it was selected for preservation in the United States National Film Registry by the Library of Congress as being "culturally, historically or aesthetically significant".

== Plot ==
=== The Rivers (1839) ===
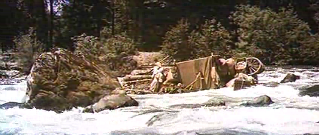
The settlers' raft is caught in rapids.

Zebulon Prescott and his family set out west for the frontier on the Erie Canal. They are pulled through the first section on a barge and then build rafts to continue on the Ohio River. Along the journey, they meet mountain man Linus Rawlings, who is traveling to Pittsburgh to trade his furs. Rawlings and Zebulon's eldest daughter, Eve, are attracted to each other, but he is not ready to settle down.

Rawlings stops at an isolated trading post, which is actually a front run by a clan of river pirates. Linus is led into a cave, stabbed in the back, and then pushed down a hole. The pirates steal his furs and sink his canoe. Wounded, Linus follows them. When they are about to rob the Prescott party, Linus intervenes and helps the Prescotts kill all of the pirates.

The Prescotts continue down the river. When the lead raft is caught in rapids, Zebulon and his wife Rebecca drown; Linus arrives to help bury them. Deciding he cannot live without Eve, he asks to marry her and take her to Pittsburgh, but she insists on homesteading at the spot where her parents died.

=== The Plains (1851) ===
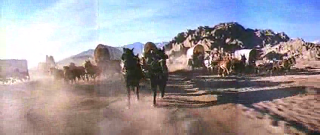
The wagon train is attacked by Cheyenne warriors.

Eve's sister Lilith chooses to go back east, dreaming of becoming rich, and years later becomes a singer and dancer in St. Louis. While performing at a music hall, she attracts the attention of professional gambler Cleve van Valen, who learns that she has just inherited a California gold mine.

On a wagon train heading west, Lilith partners with an elderly woman named Agatha; Cleve joins them to avoid his debts and to swindle Lilith of her gold. Wagonmaster Roger Morgan and Cleve court her along the way, but she rejects them both. Surviving an arduous trek and an attack by the Cheyenne together, Lilith falls for Cleve. The pair eventually arrive at the mine, but discover that it is worthless. Cleve leaves; Lilith returns to work in a camp town's dance hall, heartbroken. Morgan finds her and again proposes marriage, to no avail.

Later, Lilith performs on a Sacramento riverboat. By chance, Cleve is a passenger. The pair happily reunite, and Cleve proposes to her, telling her of the business opportunities waiting in San Francisco. She accepts his proposal.

=== The Civil War (1861–1865) ===
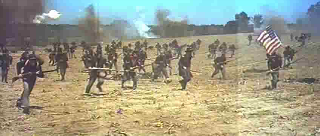
American Civil War

Linus Rawlings has joined the Union army as a captain in the American Civil War. Despite Eve's wishes, their son Zeb enlists as well, seeking adventure and an escape from farming. The bloody Battle of Shiloh shows Zeb the cruel realities of war, and his father dies there.

Zeb encounters a disillusioned Confederate soldier who suggests deserting. By chance, they eavesdrop on Generals Ulysses S. Grant and William Tecumseh Sherman. The Confederate realizes he has the opportunity to shoot them, leaving Zeb no choice but to kill him. Zeb continues to serve for the rest of the war.

When the war ends, Zeb returns home as a lieutenant and learns his mother died, having lost the will to live after losing Linus. Zeb gives his share of the family farm to his brother and leaves, deciding to stay in the army.

=== The Railroad (1868) ===
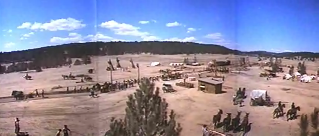
The construction of railroads

In the late 1860s, two competing railroad lines, the Central Pacific Railroad and the Union Pacific Railroad, open up new territories that attract American and European settlers.

Zeb serves in the U.S. Cavalry, trying to maintain peace with the Native Americans with the help of buffalo hunter Jethro Stuart, an old friend of Linus's. When railroad man Mike King violates a treaty by building on Native American territory, the Arapahos retaliate by stampeding buffalo through his camp, killing many.

Disgusted by Mike's unchecked greed and callousness, Zeb resigns from the army, and then visits Jethro at his mountain cabin before moving on.

=== The Outlaws (1889) ===
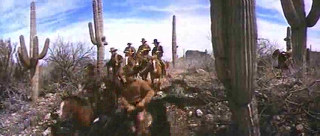
The desperadoes who want to rob the train

In San Francisco, the widowed Lilith auctions off her possessions to pay off debts. She travels to Arizona, inviting Zeb and his family to oversee a cattle ranch, her last remaining asset.

Zeb (now an Arizona marshal), his wife Julie, and their children meet Lilith at Gold City's train station. There, Zeb runs into outlaw Charlie Gant. Zeb had killed Gant's brother in a gunfight. When Gant makes threats against Zeb and his family, Zeb turns to his friend, Gold City marshal Lou Ramsey. However, Gant is not wanted for anything in that territory, so Ramsey can do nothing.

Zeb suspects Gant plans to steal a train's gold shipment, and prepares an ambush with Ramsey's reluctant help. Gant and his gang are killed in the shootout and resulting train wreck. Lilith and the Rawlings family travel by wagon to their new home.

== Cast ==
- Spencer Tracy as Narrator

Introduced in "The Rivers"

- James Stewart as Linus Rawlings
- Carroll Baker as Eve Prescott Rawlings
- Debbie Reynolds as Lilith Prescott van Valen
- Karl Malden as Zebulon Prescott
- Agnes Moorehead as Rebecca Prescott
- Walter Brennan as Col. Jeb Hawkins
- Brigid Bazlen as Dora Hawkins
- Lee Van Cleef as river pirate (uncredited)

Introduced in "The Plains"

- Gregory Peck as Cleve Van Valen
- Robert Preston as Roger Morgan
- Thelma Ritter as Agatha Clegg
- David Brian as Lilith's attorney
- John Larch as Grimes a gambler (uncredited)
- Clinton Sundberg as Hylan Seabury (uncredited)

Introduced in "The Civil War"

- George Peppard as Zeb Rawlings
- Claude Johnson as Jeremiah Rawlings (uncredited)
- Andy Devine as Corporal Peterson
- Harry Morgan as Gen. Ulysses S. Grant
- John Wayne as Gen. William Tecumseh Sherman
- Russ Tamblyn as Confederate deserter
- Raymond Massey as President Abraham Lincoln
- Ken Curtis as Cpl. Ben (uncredited)

Introduced in "The Railroad"

- Henry Fonda as Jethro Stuart
- Richard Widmark as Mike King

Introduced in "The Outlaws"

- Lee J. Cobb as Marshal Lou Ramsey
- Eli Wallach as Charlie Gant
- Carolyn Jones as Zeb Rawlings' wife, Julie
- Mickey Shaughnessy as Deputy Stover
- Harry Dean Stanton as a member of Gant's gang (uncredited)
- Jack Lambert as a member of Gant's gang (uncredited)

The film marked then 66-year-old Raymond Massey's last appearance as Abraham Lincoln, a role that he previously played on stage (Abe Lincoln in Illinois and the stage adaptation of John Brown's Body), on screen (Abe Lincoln in Illinois) and on television (The Day Lincoln Was Shot, and two more productions of Abe Lincoln in Illinois).

== Production ==
=== Development ===
MGM had enjoyed a great success with the big screen remake of Ben-Hur (1959) and initiated a number of spectacles, including remakes of Cimarron, Four Horsemen of the Apocalypse and Mutiny on the Bounty.

In 1960, MGM struck a deal to produce four films in the Cinerama process, and Bing Crosby approached the studio with a proposition. He was developing a television spectacular called How the West Was Won based on photographs of the Old West in Life, with profits earmarked for St. John's Hospital, along with an album inspired by the same article recorded with Rosemary Clooney. MGM purchased the film rights from Crosby.

MGM announced the project in June 1960, originally titled The Great Western Story. The plan was to film a story of six segments featuring 12 stars, with a cohesive overall storyline. Among the historical figures to be featured were Buffalo Bill, the James brothers and Billy the Kid. St. John's Hospital president Irene Dunne and others persuaded the film's stars to accept less than their usual fees. However, the hospital later sued for a share of the film's profits.

Bernard Smith was assigned as producer, and he hired James Webb to write the script. George Peppard was announced as the lead in October 1960, and Irene Dunne and Bing Crosby were originally announced as stars. Laurence Harvey and John Wayne were also slated to appear in one sequence together. Filmink commented Peppard "carries the last three-fifths" of the film, adding "if anyone is the leading man of that movie, it's him."

By April 1961, Wayne and Spencer Tracy had confirmed their plans to play Generals Sherman and Grant for a segment directed by John Ford, and James Stewart had been signed as well. Other roles would go to Gregory Peck, Debbie Reynolds, Russ Tamblyn and Carroll Baker, while Henry Hathaway and George Marshall would also direct from a script by James Webb. Crosby was scheduled to provide narration. Jim Hutton was intended to appear in the Civil War segment. Eventually, Harry Morgan appeared as Grant when Tracy was unavailable.

Ultimately, the film contained five sections: the 1830s westward migration, the 1849 California gold rush, the Civil War, the construction of the transcontinental railroad, and the "taming" of the Wild West, with one family's story over three generations providing the bridge between each time period. The budget was set to at least $8 million. John Ford directed the Civil War segment, George Marshall the railroad segment and Henry Hathaway the rest. "We wanted three old pros, no young geniuses," said Smith.

=== Cinerama ===
How the West Was Won was one of only two dramatic feature films (along with The Wonderful World of the Brothers Grimm) produced with the three-strip Cinerama process. Although the picture quality when projected onto curved screens in theaters is stunning, attempts to convert the film to a smaller screen suffer. When the film is projected in letterbox format, the actors' faces are nearly indistinguishable in long shots.

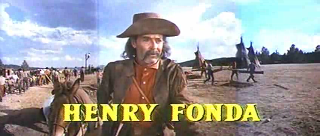
Henry Fonda as a buffalo hunter

=== Filming ===
Principal photography began in May 1961 by John Ford in Paducah, Kentucky. Producer Bernard Smith said, "It is essential for our purposes that virtually the whole movie be shot outdoors. Throughout the movie, one of the basic themes is to show little people against a vast country – huge deserts, endless plains, towering mountains, broad rivers. We want to capture the spirit of adventure, the restless spirit that led these men and women across the country in [the] face of many difficulties and dangers."

After Ford finished his segment, Hathaway took over on location. Hathaway called Ford's segment "a little stagey".

Parts of the film were shot in Monument Valley, Utah and in Wildwood Regional Park in Thousand Oaks, California, Ohio River Valley, the Black Hills of South Dakota, the Colorado Rockies, the Rogue and McKenzie Rivers in Oregon and the Magma Arizona Railroad in Arizona.

Ford complained about having to dress such huge sets, as Cinerama photographed a much wider view than did the standard single-camera process to which Hollywood directors were accustomed. Director Henry Hathaway was quoted as saying, "That Goddamned Cinerama; do you know a waist shot is as close as you can get with that thing?"

A more difficult problem was that filming required that the actors be artificially positioned out of dramatic and emotional frame and out of synchronization with one another. Only when the three-print Cinerama process was projected upon a Cinerama screen did the positions and emotions of the actors synchronize, such as normal eye contact or emotional harmony between actors in a dramatic sequence. Because of the nature of Cinerama, if the film were shown in flat-screen projection, it would appear as if the actors made no eye contact. One brief scene of Mexican soldiers was sourced by John Wayne from his 1960 version of The Alamo.

Stuntman Bob Morgan, husband of Yvonne De Carlo, was seriously injured and lost a leg during a break in filming a gunfight on a moving train while filming the Outlaws portion. Chains holding logs on a flatbed car broke, crushing Morgan as he crouched beside them.

In a scene in which George Peppard's character reminisces about his late father, Peppard improvises with an imitation of James Stewart's voice. Ford initially objected, but Peppard felt that it was important in such a long, sprawling film to remind the audience which character his father was supposed to be.

Hathaway later said that making the film was "goddam trouble. They had an idiot for a producer and Sol Siegel was drunk most of the time. We spent so much money on the picture they almost decided not to do the last part. We had a meeting, and I said, 'You can't quit. You've got to show how the West was won. The West was won when the law took over'."

=== Post-production ===
Filming was completed in January 1962. After the film was shot, MGM ordered a new ending that resolved the family story, which caused shooting to continue for another month and included George Peppard and Debbie Reynolds. The budget eventually reached $12 million.

For "The Civil War" segment, footage from MGM's 1957 film Raintree County of the Civil War Battle of Chickamauga were used for combat scenes during the day, as the scenes with Peppard, Tamblyn, Wayne, and Morgan were all at night. A brief shot of a steamboat going down a river (seen during the end of the Plains Segment) is also used from Raintree County.

For "The Railroad" segment, a subplot was cut featuring Hope Lange as Stewart's daughter, Julie, who becomes involved in a love triangle with Zeb and King; she ultimately marries and abandons Zeb.

The film later inspired a television series of the same name.

== Music ==
The film's music was composed and conducted by Alfred Newman. The soundtrack album was originally released by MGM Records. Dimitri Tiomkin, known for his Western film scores, was the first composer approached, but he became unavailable following eye surgery and Newman was hired as a replacement.

The score appears on AFI's 100 Years of Film Scores list and was nominated for the Academy Award for Best Original Score, losing to the score for Tom Jones.

Debbie Reynolds sings three songs in the film: "Raise a Ruckus Tonight" starting a party around the camp fire, "What Was Your Name in the States?" and "A Home in the Meadow" to the tune of "Greensleeves", with lyrics by Sammy Cahn. Her rendition is heard by Cleve (Gregory Peck), who is so moved that he proposes marriage. This scene ends the Plains segment.

== Reception ==
Re-release trailer for How the West Was Won

=== Premiere ===
Surprisingly for such an American film, How the West Was Won had its world premiere in the United Kingdom at London's Casino Cinerama Theatre on November 1, 1962. It had a $450,000 advance. The film ran at the Casino for 123 weeks, ending in April 1965.

=== Critical reception ===
Harold Myers of Variety called it a "magnificent and exciting spectacle" and in relation to the Cinerama process noted that there had been "a vast improvement in the process. The print joins are barely noticeable, and the wobble, which beset earlier productions, has been eliminated." Reviews from London were favorable but with reservations over the storyline. Alexander Walker of the Evening Standard called it "a super-epic which shucks away your sophistication. If ever I heard the sound of success it is this." The Times said "it has a kind of surge and splendour and extravagance not to be despised."

In 2025, The Hollywood Reporter listed How the West Was Won as having the best stunts of 1962.

On the review aggregator website Rotten Tomatoes, 85% of 26 critics' reviews are positive.

=== Box-office performance ===
How the West Was Won was a massive commercial success. Produced on a large budget of $15 million, it grossed $46,500,000 at the North American box office, making it the second-highest-grossing film of 1963. The film has grossed over $50 million worldwide.

=== Accolades ===
The following people won Academy Awards for their work:

- James R. Webb – Best Writing, Story and Screenplay – Written Directly for the Screen
- Harold F. Kress – Best Film Editing
- Franklin Milton – Best Sound

The following were nominated for five other Academy Awards:

- Bernard Smith – Best Picture
- George Davis, William Ferrari, Addison Hehr, Henry Grace, Don Greenwood Jr. and Jack Mills – Best Art Direction – Set Decoration, Color
- William Daniels, Milton Krasner, Charles Lang and Joseph LaShelle – Best Cinematography, Color
- Walter Plunkett – Best Costume Design, Color
- Alfred Newman and Ken Darby – Best Music, Score – Substantially Original

The score was ranked 25th on the American Film Institute 2005 list AFI's 100 Years of Film Scores.

The February 2020 issue of New York Magazine lists How the West Was Won as among "The Best Movies That Lost Best Picture at the Oscars."

== Restoration ==
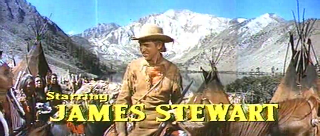
James Stewart as frontiersman Linus Rawlings

In 2000, Warner Bros. assigned Crest Digital the task of restoring the original Cinerama negative for How the West Was Won. As part of the process, Crest Digital built its own authentic Cinerama screening room. Hewlett-Packard has led efforts to combine the three image portions to make the Cinerama image look more acceptable on a flat screen. This has finally been accomplished on the latest DVD and Blu-ray disc release. Previously, the lines where the three Cinerama panels join were glaringly visible, but this has been largely corrected on the Warner Bros. DVD and Blu-ray releases. However, the joints remain visible in places, especially against bright backgrounds.

The restoration also corrects some of the geometric distortions inherent in the process. For instance, in the final shot, the Golden Gate Bridge appears to curve in perspective as the camera flies underneath it whereas in the Cinerama version, it breaks into three straight sections at different angles.

The Blu-ray disc also contains a "SmileBox" version simulating the curved-screen effect.

Though the aspect ratio of Cinerama is 2.59:1, Warner's new releases of the film offer an aspect ratio of 2.89:1, incorporating much information on both sides that was not intended to be seen when projected. The Blu-ray-exclusive SmileBox alternative contains the intended cropping intact.

In 2006, Warner Bros. Motion Picture Imaging performed digital restoration on How the West Was Won. The film was restored frame by frame at Prasad Corporation to remove dirt, tears, scratches and other damage, restoring the film's original appearance. The restored version has been shown on television since October 2008 on the Encore Westerns channel.

== Adaptations ==
=== Comics ===
- Gold Key Comics: How the West Was Won (July 1963)

=== Novelization ===
The novelization was written in 1962 by Western author Louis L'Amour. According to his son Beau, his father had frequent clashes with the studio, both over elements of inauthenticity and inaccuracy in the film, and with the indecisiveness of the studio regarding the segments to be made, and thus, those that L'Amour would need to include in the novelization.

=== Television series ===
The film inspired a television series of the same name, produced by MGM Television and aired on ABC. The series began with a two-hour television film, The Macahans, that premiered in January 1976, followed by three seasons which aired between February 1977 and April 1979. The series shared similar themes to its namesake by focusing on a long-running family saga and features a protagonist named "Zeb/Zebulon", but was otherwise unrelated in narrative.

== See also ==
- List of American films of 1963
- List of American films of 1962
