= Crest Digital =

American film post-production company

- Company type: Private
- Industry: post-production, broadcast media
- Founded: 1961
- Headquarters: Anaheim, California
- Key people: Ron Stein, CEO
- Number of employees: 150 (2009)
- Website: www.crestdigital.com

Crest Digital was a privately owned company specializing in post production and DVD/CD replication. Crest Digital provided editing, DVD and Blu-ray authoring, digital asset management, audio mixing, language dubbing and subtitling, and DVD/CD optical media replication services. Clients included major film and television studios, software companies, record labels, airlines and industrial clients from around the world. The company closed in September 2012.

== History ==
Crest Digital was founded in 1961 by Maurice Stein, a former camera store owner and color timer, and his wife Jeanne. Originally named Crest National Film Laboratories, the company's services first included developing original 35mm and 16mm film negative, release printing and film restoration. During the 1970s and 1980s, Crest National expanded into the world of video and began to service the in-flight entertainment and cable TV industries. Language dubbing and subtitling, restoration, editing, sub-mastering, and videotape duplication services were later added. In the 1990s, CD and DVD replication, DVD encoding, menu design and authoring services were offered and a new optical media manufacturing plant was built in Hollywood in 1996. By 2000, Crest National was named #22 of "The 100 Fastest Growing Private Companies in Los Angeles.

Crest National was given the task of restoring the original Cinerama negative for “How the West Was Won" in 2000 and built their own screening room, complete with three authentic Cinerama projectors, a seven-track sound system and 146-degree curved screen, in order to complete the projects.” Crest National acquired Anaheim-based Concord Disc Manufacturing Corp. in 2004, doubling the size of their CD/DVD replication operation and quadrupling their packaging capabilities. Crest National rebranded as Crest Digital in 2006 and expanded their operations into China in 2007, partnering with China Film Group and building a 15,000 square meter state-of-the-art DVD and CD manufacturing facility outside Beijing.

Crest Digital had been the country's majority provider of in-flight movies to airlines since the 1970s. They provided editing-for-content, captioning, encoding, and dubbing and subtitling services in over 65 languages to all the major airlines.

Crest Digital was one of only three Class ‘A' DVD Verification Laboratories, and one of only two Class ‘A' HD DVD Laboratories approved by the DVD Forum in North America.

Ron Stein, son of Crest Digital's founders, was the president and CEO. Throughout its lifetime, the company had been family owned.

== Firsts (partial list) ==
In 1963, Crest Digital developed the first 35/32 printing equipment for use in motion picture labs. The first closed captioning for the hearing impaired direct for home video cassette and videodisc release was introduced by Crest Digital (then called Crest National) in 1984. The company introduced the world's first 65/70mm flying spot scanner film transfer system, “Ultrascan 70™” in 1991. In 2002, the first Cineglyph HD large-format telecine was introduced. Royal Philips Electronics and Crest Digital partnered in May 2002 to develop and install the first Super Audio CD (SACD) hybrid disc production line in the country at Crest Digital's Hollywood facilities, with a production capacity of 3 million discs per year. Crest Digital also did the first MPEG encoding for in-flight films.

== 70mm Films in Ultrascan 70 (List incomplete) ==
- 2001:A Space Odyssey
- The Hallelujah Trail
- South Pacific
- Oklahoma!
- STAR!
- It's a Mad, Mad, Mad, Mad World
- The Alamo
- Spartacus
- West Side Story
- Chitty Chitty Bang Bang
- The Sound of Music
- Baraka

== Awards ==
- American Society of Cinematography 1994
- Hollywood Chamber of Commerce Women of Distinction Award to Crest Digital Executive Vice President Lorraine Stein Ross 2000
- Golden Image Awards 2002
- Microsoft Premier Vendor Award 2004
- Specialty Graphics Imaging Association Continuity Award 2004
- Saturn Awards: 2002, 2005, 2006, 2007
- Specialty Graphics Imaging Association Division: CD 2004
- Hollywood Arts Council Charlie Award, Industry Founders Award 2004
- Screen Printing and Graphic Imaging Association International-Golden Image Competition (SGIA) Division: CDs 2001
- World Airline Entertainment Association (WAEA) Lifetime Achievement Award presented to Crest Digital CEO Ron Stein 2009
