= Fort Robinson =

Former U.S. Army fort, Nebraska

Fort Robinson State Park
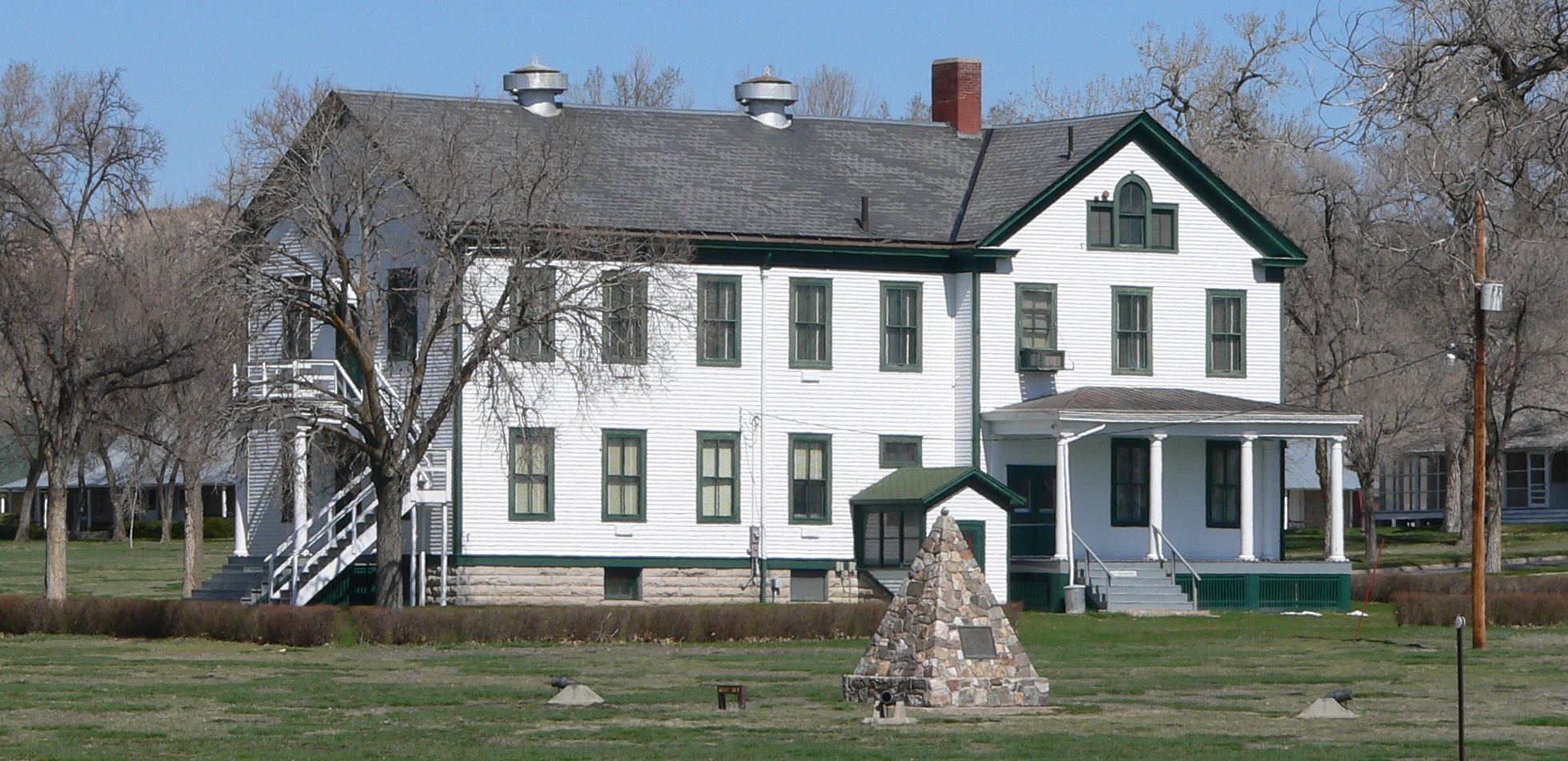
- Post headquarters

- Location within Nebraska
- Location: Dawes & Sioux counties, Nebraska, United States
- Nearest city: Crawford, Nebraska
- Coordinates: 42°40′52″N 103°29′49″W
- Area: 22,332.72 acres (9,037.73 ha)
- Elevation: 3,806 ft (1,160 m)
- Established: 1956
- Administrator: Nebraska Game and Parks Commission & Nebraska State Historical Society
- Designation: Nebraska state park
- Website: Fort Robinson State Park
- Fort Robinson and Red Cloud Agency
- U.S. National Register of Historic Places
- U.S. National Historic Landmark District
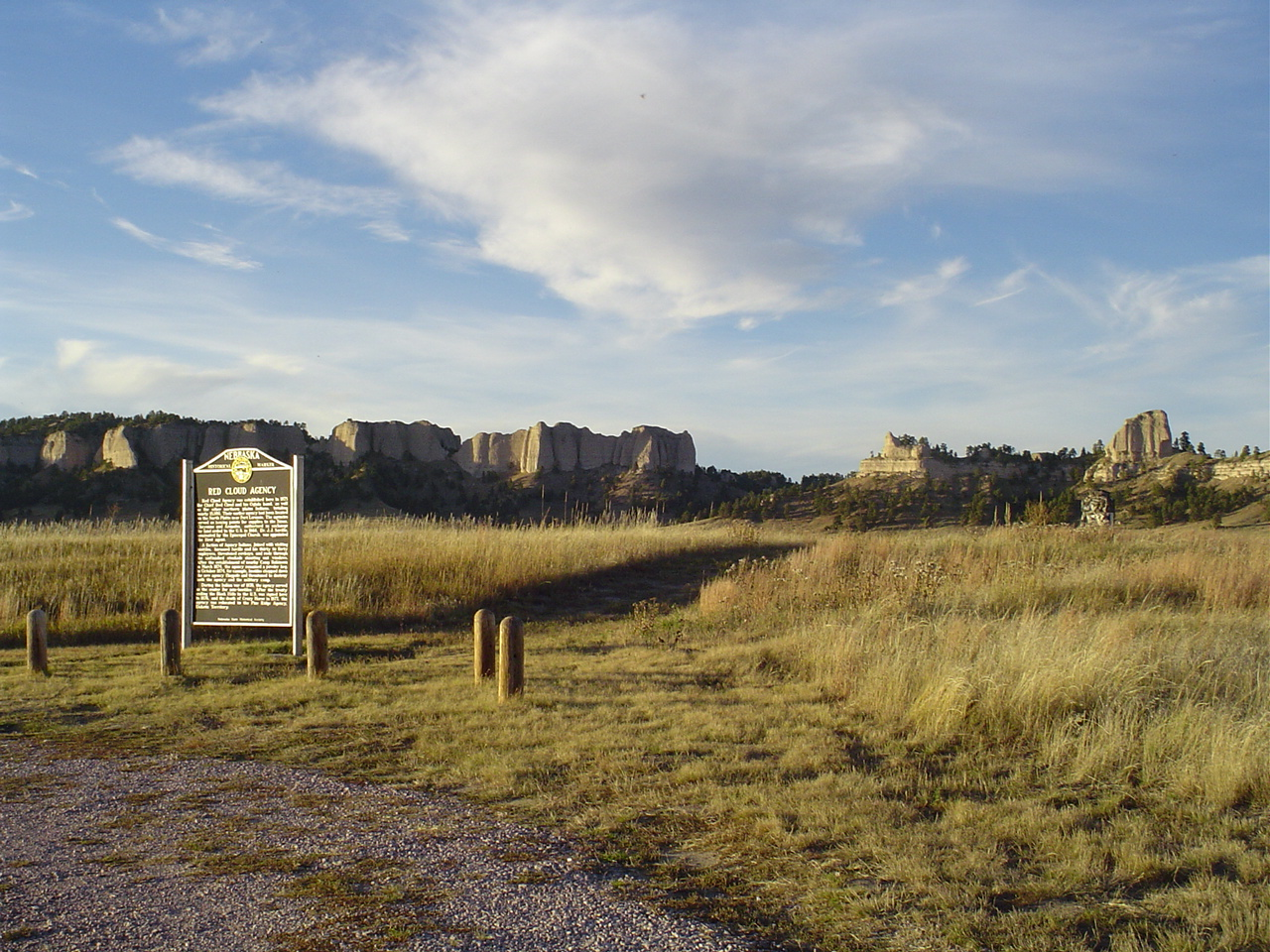
- Site of the second Red Cloud Agency
- Location: Dawes and Sioux counties, Nebraska, U.S.
- Nearest city: Crawford, Nebraska
- Area: 2,500 acres (10.1 km^{2})
- Built: 1873
- NRHP reference No.: 66000442

Significant dates
- Added to NRHP: October 15, 1966
- Designated NHLD: December 19, 1960

Fort Robinson is a former U.S. Army fort and now a major feature of Fort Robinson State Park, a 22,000-acre (8,900 ha) public recreation and historic preservation area located 2 miles (3.2 km) west of Crawford on U.S. Route 20 in the Pine Ridge region of northwest Nebraska.

The fort was declared a National Historic Landmark in 1960 and is part of the Fort Robinson and Red Cloud Agency historic district. This includes Fort Robinson and the site of the second Red Cloud Agency (about 1.5 mi (2.4 km) to the east). The district also includes the Camp Canby site and the 1886 Percy Homestead. The fort is managed by the Nebraska Game and Parks Commission, with some individual buildings operated by the Nebraska State Historical Society and the University of Nebraska–Lincoln.

== History ==
In August 1873, the Red Cloud Agency was moved from the North Platte River to the White River, near what is now Crawford, Nebraska, in the northwest corner of the state. The following March, the U. S. Government authorized the establishment of a military camp at the agency site. Some 13,000 Lakota had been subject to resettlement.

The camp was named Camp Robinson in honor of Lt. Levi H. Robinson, who had been killed by Indians near Fort Laramie in February. In May, the military camp was moved 1.5 miles (2.4 km) west of the agency to its present location; the camp was renamed Fort Robinson in January 1878.

Fort Robinson was a base of US military forces and played a major role in the Sioux Wars from 1876 to 1890. The Battle of Warbonnet Creek took place nearby in July 1876. The great war leader Crazy Horse surrendered at the fort along with his 1,100 followers on May 6, 1877, and on September 5 that year, he was killed there while resisting imprisonment. Upon getting outside the guardhouse door, he was bayoneted in the back by Private William Gentles. The bayonet pierced through his lung and kidney leaving behind a deadly wound. As Crazy Horse collapsed to the ground, Dr. McGillicuddy, order his body to be placed in the nearby Adjutant's Office. Near midnight on September 5th, 1877, Crazy Horse died of his wounds in the Camp Robinson Adjutant's Office. A historic plaque marks the site of his death.

On January 9th,1879, Chief Morning Star (also known as Dull Knife) led the Northern Cheyenne in a breakout from one of the Fort Robinson soldiers' barracks they were being held in. The Northern Cheyenne that were following Dull Knife surrendered to US forces on the banks of Chadron Creek and were then brought into what was then Camp Robinson in mid-October of 1878. Because the Cheyenne had refused to return to Indian Territory, on January 3rd, the military operating at Fort Robinson decided that they were going to withhold food, water and firewood to try to force the Cheyenne into a quicker submission. After arrests of Chiefs Wild Hog and Old Crow and the morning of January 9th, the young men took control and decided that night would be the best time to escape. At 10:00 pm, gunshots rang out from the barrack the Cheyenne were being held in. As the shots erupted the Cheyenne fled out of the barrack heading to Soldier Creek to the south of the fort grounds. Alerted by the gunshots, soldiers from the other barracks began pursuing the escaping Cheyenne. U.S. soldiers began hunting down the escapees, killing men, women, and children in the Fort Robinson massacre. The U.S. Supreme Court described it as a "shocking story", "one of the most melancholy of Indian tragedies". The event marked the end of the Sioux and Cheyenne wars in Nebraska.

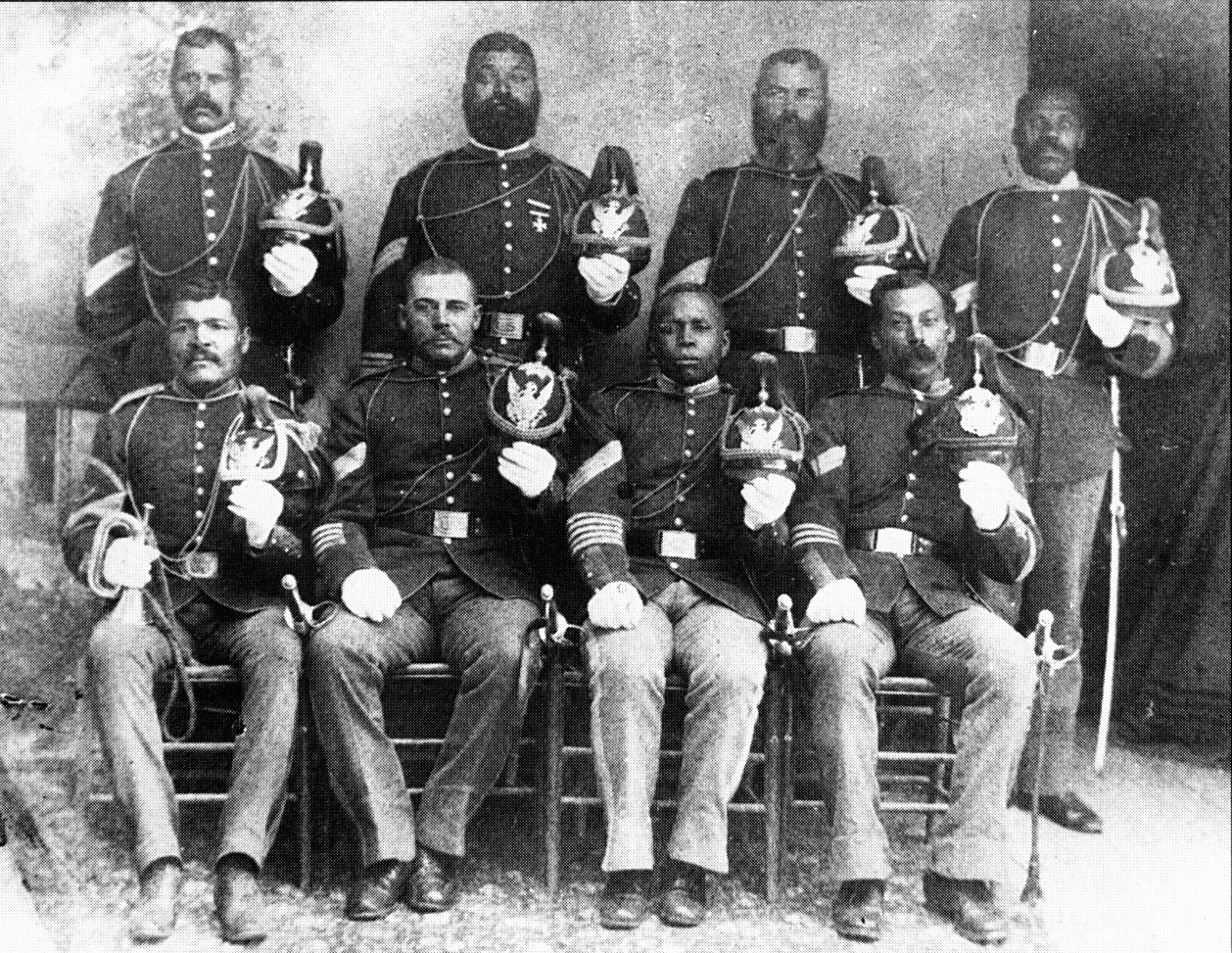
Non-commissioned officers from the United States Army's 9th Cavalry Regiment (Buffalo Soldiers), Fort Robinson, 1889

In 1885, the 9th Cavalry Regiment, nicknamed the Buffalo Soldiers by Native Americans, was stationed at Fort Robinson. During the next several years, the fort was enlarged, and military training was a major activity. From 1889 to 1890, Second Lieutenant Charles Young served here and later was reassigned to the regiment. A black pioneer officer who had graduated from West Point, he was the highest-ranking black person in the US Army throughout his career and achieved the rank of colonel. From 1887 to 1898, the fort served as regimental headquarters. The post gymnasium and theatre, built in 1904, provided entertainment for the soldiers.

In 1919 at the end of World War I, Fort Robinson became the world's largest quartermaster remount depot. It was used as a breeding and training center for horses and mules for the military. In addition, stallions owned by the military were used to breed with local stock to improve it. During the Great Depression, a hobo was murdered on a Chicago & Northwestern freight train within the fort. During World War II, the fort was the site of a K-9 corps training center and a German prisoner-of-war camp.

Closing

The U.S. Army decided to abandon Fort Robinson in 1947; in the following year, it transferred the property to the U.S. Department of Agriculture (USDA), for its Beef Cattle Research Station. After some buildings were demolished in the mid-1950s, efforts were made to preserve the fort as a historic site. In 1955, History Nebraska, formally the Nebraska State Historical Society, began to acquire property on the fort; in 1956, they opened a museum on the site. The USDA closed its operation in 1971, and transferred the property to the state of Nebraska.

State park

The Fort Robinson State Park was established in 1956 following the purchase of a parcel of land by the Nebraska Game, Forestation and Parks Commission in 1955. The park was expanded after much of the site was deeded over from the Federal government in 1964. It reached its full size with Nebraska's purchase of the adjoining James Arthur Ranch in 1972.

== Features ==
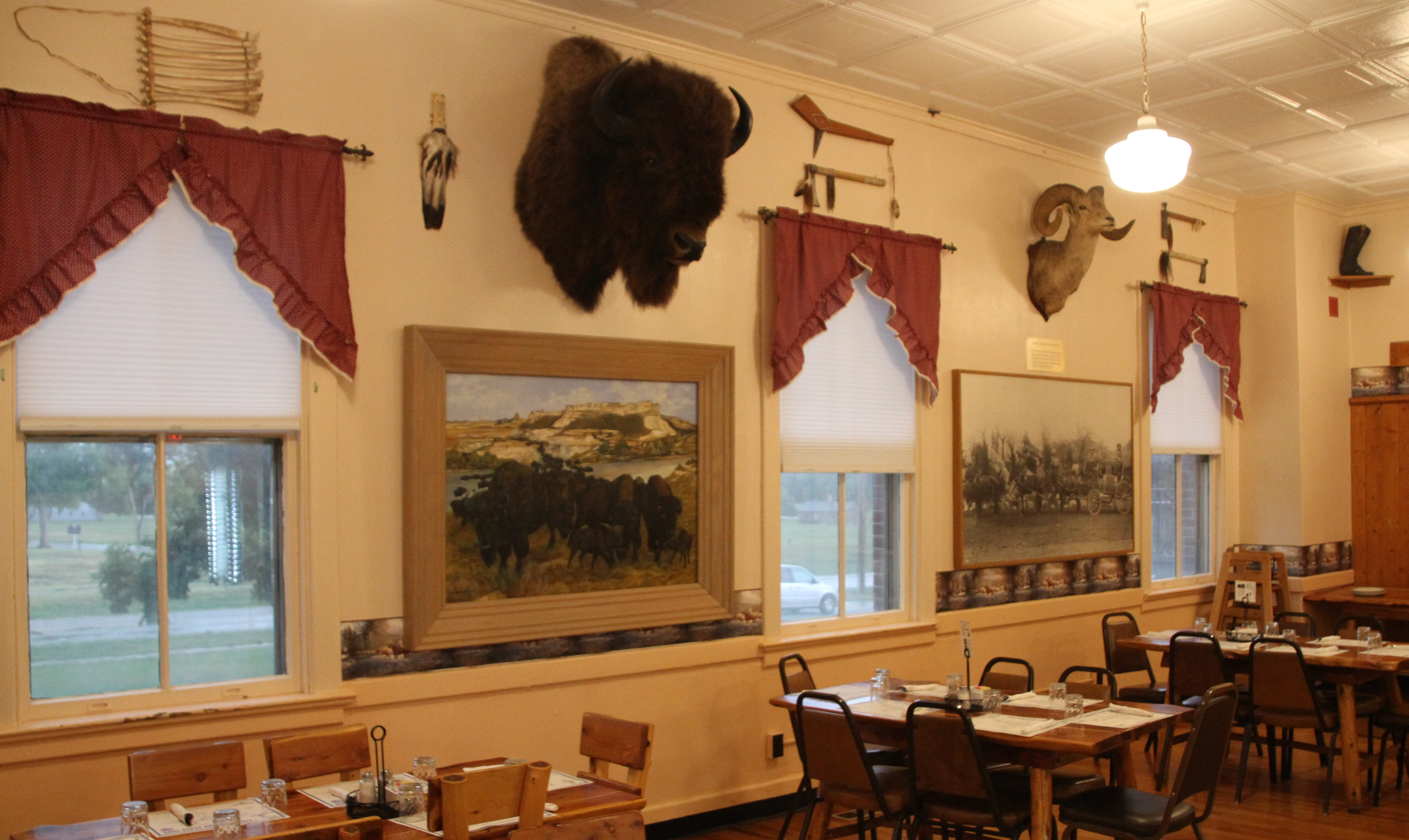
The restaurant in Comanche Hall, the historic Bachelor Officers' Quarters at Fort Robinson

The fort's historic buildings and sites include the 1904 blacksmith shop, the 1908 veterinary hospital, the 1887 officers' quarters, the 1875 guardhouse and adjutant's office, and the post cemetery. There is also a library with materials about Fort Robinson and military and western history available for research. A quartermaster's stores building is now used as a playhouse.

The Fort Robinson Museum is located in the 1905 post headquarters building. Exhibits focus on the fort's history, including its role guarding the Red Cloud Agency from 1874 to 1877, up through the housing of World War II German POWs from 1943 to 1946. The Trailside Museum of Natural History, operated by the University of Nebraska State Museum, is located in the historic Army Theatre building.

Fort Robinson is also home to The Post Playhouse, a professional theatre company that produces live theatre during summer months with creative teams of actors, musicians, and directors assembled from across the United States and nearby.

== See also ==
- List of forts in the United States
