= Morning Star (chief) =

Chief of the Northern Cheyenne people

- Vóóhéhéve
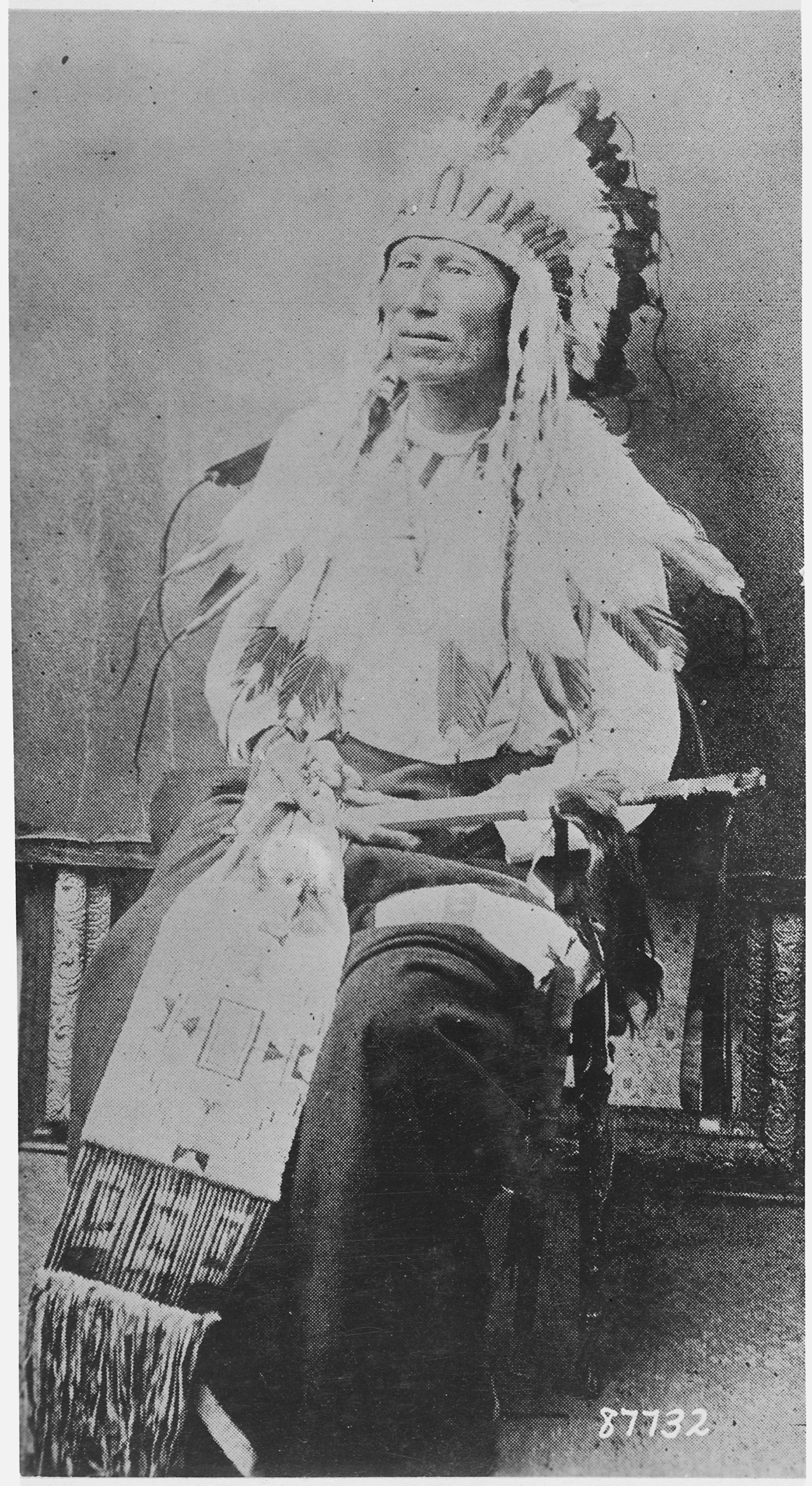

Northern Cheyenne leader

Personal details
- Born: ca. 1810
- Died: 1883
- Resting place: Lame Deer, Montana
- Nickname(s): Dull Knife (Tamílapéšni, Tah-me-la-phe-shnee or Motšêške Ôhnêxahpo)

Morning Star (Cheyenne: Vóóhéhéve; also known by his Lakota Sioux name Tȟamílapȟéšni or its translation, Dull Knife) (c. 1810–1883) was a great chief of the Northern Cheyenne people and headchief of the Notameohmésêhese ("Northern Eaters"; also simply known as Ȯhmésėhese or "Eaters") band on the northern Great Plains during the 19th century. He was noted for his active resistance to westward expansion and the United States federal government. It is due to the courage and determination of Morning Star and other leaders that the Northern Cheyenne still possess a homeland in their traditional country in present-day Montana.

Although he was known as "Dull Knife" (or Motšêške Ôhnêxahpo in Cheyenne, a translation of his Lakota name) to local settlers, U.S. military leaders, and other American Indians, his Cheyenne name is translated as "Morning Star". A Cheyenne warrior in every sense of the word, Morning Star was described by many writers of the era as "an admirable outlaw" comparable to the likes of Rob Roy and William Wallace.

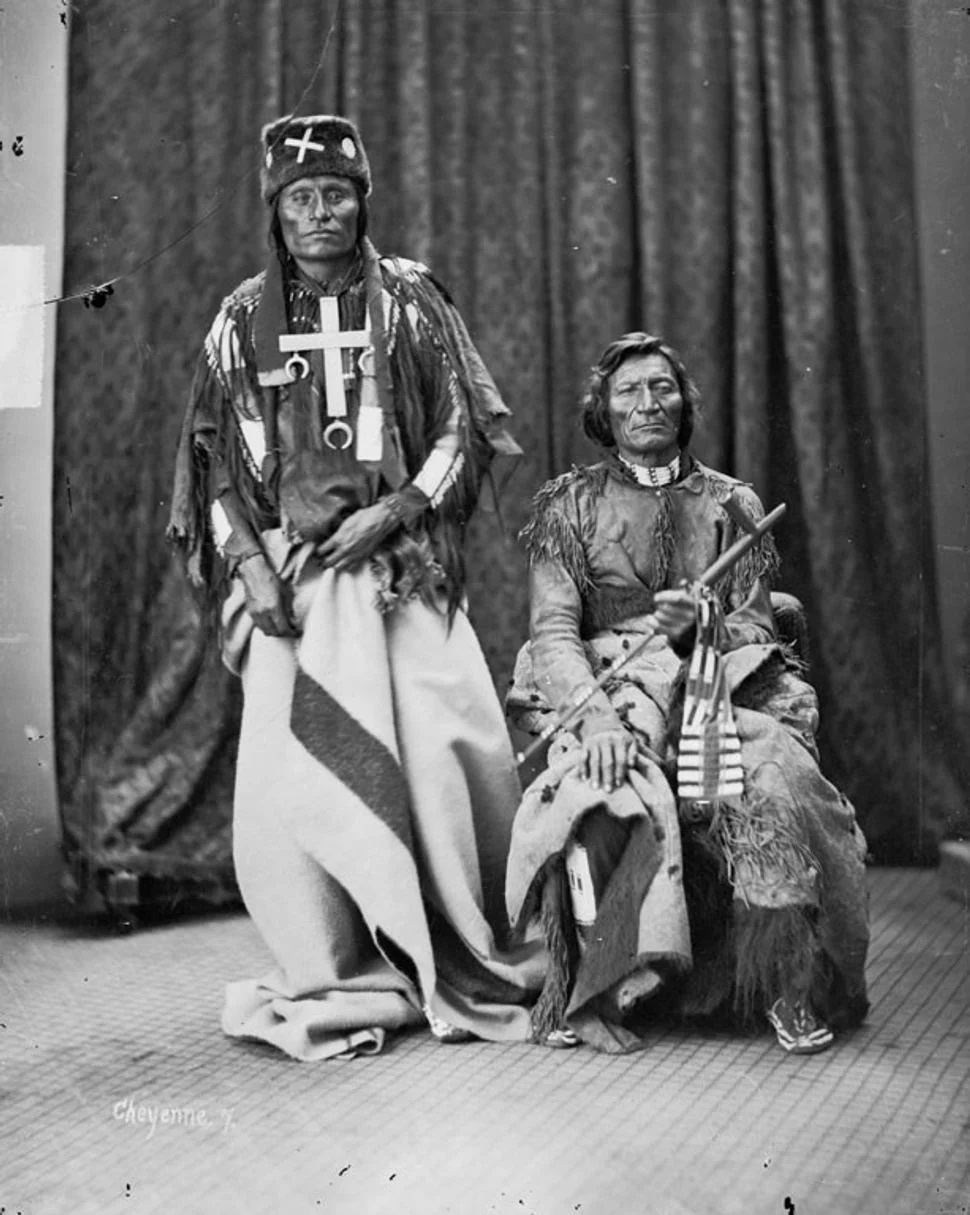
Little Coyote (Little Wolf) and Morning Star (Dull Knife), chiefs of the Northern Cheyenne

In 1851, Morning Star represented his tribe at the signing of the first Treaty of Fort Laramie. Following Custer's Last Stand at the Battle of the Little Bighorn during the Great Sioux War of 1876, Morning Star allied with the Sioux and other tribes against the United States. However, after a destructive raid by American soldiers under Colonel Ranald S. Mackenzie in which 200 lodges were destroyed and 700 livestock captured, most of the Cheyenne were eventually forced to surrender. They expected to live on reservations with the Sioux in the north, but were subsequently transported to the Darlington Agency on the Cheyenne and Arapaho Indian Reservation in the Indian Territory.

Unable to hunt sufficient game while on the reservation, the tribe suffered from starvation and disease until September 1878, when Morning Star led the tribe north, back toward their ancient homelands. Fighting through, the Cheyenne were able to outmaneuver federal troops across the plains and in the Nebraska Sand Hills until they were captured near Fort Robinson. The tribe was said to have taken apart their guns and hidden the pieces under blankets or as necklaces and bracelets worn by children. Though Morning Star explained that his people would put up no further resistance if allowed to live with Red Cloud on the Pine Ridge Indian Reservation in the Dakota Territory, the Army still insisted that they return south to the Southern Cheyenne reservation. On January 8, 1879, the Northern Cheyenne tried to escape the fort using the dismantled guns they had hidden upon their arrival, but they were quickly pursued; many Cheyenne, mostly women and children, were killed by federal troops in the Fort Robinson massacre. However, a few of the tribe managed to escape, including Morning Star, who eventually reached the Pine Ridge Agency and was held as a prisoner until he and the survivors were allowed to settle on a reservation near Fort Keogh in the Montana Territory.

== Legacy ==
Morning Star died in 1883 and is interred on the Northern Cheyenne reservation at Lame Deer Cemetery. Chief Dull Knife College, which is also in Lame Deer, is named in his honor. As Dull Knife, his photograph appears in Dee Brown's 1971 bestseller Bury My Heart at Wounded Knee.
