= John Homer Seger =

American educator (1846–1928)

- Born: February 23, 1846; Geauga County, Ohio
- Died: February 6, 1928 (aged 81); Colony, Oklahoma
- Other names: John H. Segar; J. H. Segar
- Occupations: soldier, mason, carpenter, educator
- Years active: 1864-1905
- Known for: Educating Native American children
- Notable work: Founded Seger Colony (later named Colony, Oklahoma)

John Homer Seger (February 23, 1846 – February 6, 1928) was an American educator best known for his work with the Arapaho tribe in Oklahoma.

== Early years ==
Seger was born in Geauga County, Ohio, and grew up in Dover, Bureau County, Illinois. His parents were Andrew and Louisa Knox Seger, who had seven children, four boys and three girls. John's father, Andrew, was born August 3, 1812, in Onondaga County, New York. At the age of twenty, Andrew moved to Geauga County, Ohio, where he met Louisa, who had been born there on June 4, 1817. He acquired some land in the wilderness, where Andrew began farming and built a one-room sod house, in which all their children were born. John also had another brother, Frank, who died in infancy.

== Civil War ==
When the Civil War broke out, two of John's older brothers volunteered for military service almost as soon as they heard the news. A county-wide meeting was held with the goal of raising a regiment of 100 young men as volunteers for the Union Army. None were willing to accept the call. According to Thoburn, Andrew Seger got up and said that if the young would not enlist, then the old men would have to do the fighting, and signed the enlistment form. Other men close to his age also enlisted. That spurred the youths present to enlist until the goal of one hundred was reached. Even the local Methodist preacher was inspired to join the volunteers and was named captain of the regiment.

== Seger's service in the Civil War ==
Meanwhile, John continued his education at Dover Academy. (Note: A Google search shows that several schools have operated in various parts of the United States using the same or closely related names. Thoburn did not identify which one John Seger attended. One was in Bureau County, Illinois in the late 1850s, so it is reasonable to assume that was Seger's school, but there is no document action to support that assumption. Thoburn also did not specify whether Seger graduated with a degree.) John joined the Union Army in 1864, when he served in General William Tecumseh Sherman’s "March to the Sea." According to Thoburn, he carried his knapsack and rifle over 1,500 miles (2,400 km) in the march through Georgia, the Carolinas and Virginia and surviving 13 battles and skirmishes. After the war, he worked in Wisconsin and New Malden, Kansas. In 1867, Seger went to settle on the Kickapoo Reservation in Western Kansas, where he first met John D. Miles, the agent for the Kickapoo tribe. (Note: When Brinton Darlington, the agent for the Cheyennes and Arapahoes in western Indian Territory, died in 1872, Miles was transferred from Kansas to replace him.)

== Teaching in Western Oklahoma ==
By 1872, Seger took a position as a mason and carpenter for a new school at the Darlington Agency Site on the Cheyenne and Arapaho Indian Reservation in what was then the western part of Indian Territory, working under agent John D. Miles. When the school opened in 1875, Seger became its first superintendent, a position he held until 1882. In 1883, Agent Miles leased 3 million acres of Cheyenne-Arapaho land to seven cattle ranchers. According to the Encyclopedia of Oklahoma History and Culture, "turmoil" started between tribe members and the ranchers. ((During this time, Seger was employed by the cattlemen to build a 300 miles (480 km) fence and to oversee a ranch near the present town of Colony. The Federal Government terminated the leases in 1885, and ordered the removal of all the cattle from the Indian land.

By 1885, the Cheyenne and Arapaho faced the land allotment process that was being considered in Congress. So at the request of Indian agent Jesse Lee, in 1886, Seger led 120 Arapaho westward to establish the 'Seger Colony', an agricultural community on Cobb Creek (Oklahoma) in the western part of the territory. He was the only white man in his party, and he is estimated to be the only white man within a 50-mile (80 km) radius at the time. Seger became instrumental in both building the housing and other buildings for the colony's new school, and leading the Arapaho in developing the community. He also served as an agent appointed to help allot the reservation lands to individual tribe members in 1890-1891.

In 1893, Seger founded the Seger Industrial Training School in the colony and served as its superintendent for 12 years. Seger retired from the school in 1905 and lived in the colony until his death in February 1928. In 1896, Seger's colony was renamed as the community of Colony in Oklahoma Territory, and became the present town of Colony, Oklahoma, in Washita County, Oklahoma, after statehood.
