= Seger Indian Training School =

- Formerly listed on the U.S. National Register of Historic Places
- Location within Oklahoma Location within the United States
- Location: E edge of Colony, Colony, Oklahoma
- Coordinates: 35°20′41″N 98°40′11″W
- Area: 6 acres (2.4 ha)
- Built: 1893
- NRHP reference No.: 71001080

Significant dates
- Added to NRHP: August 5, 1971
- Removed from NRHP: January 1, 1973

The Seger Indian Training School was a historic school on the eastern edge of Colony, Oklahoma. John Homer Seger, a white settler in the Indian Territory, founded the school in 1893. Seger had come to the Darlington Agency in 1875 to work as a teacher, and he established the Seger Colony (the predecessor of Colony) in 1886 with 120 Arapaho. His school taught farming and industrial skills to Native Americans until it closed in 1941; one of the buildings later became Colony's public school.

The school was added to the National Register of Historic Places in 1971; at the time, its buildings were stated to be in poor condition. It was destroyed by fire under mysterious circumstances on September 7, 1971. It was removed from the Register in 1973.
