= Marcus Robbins =

Marcus M. Robbins
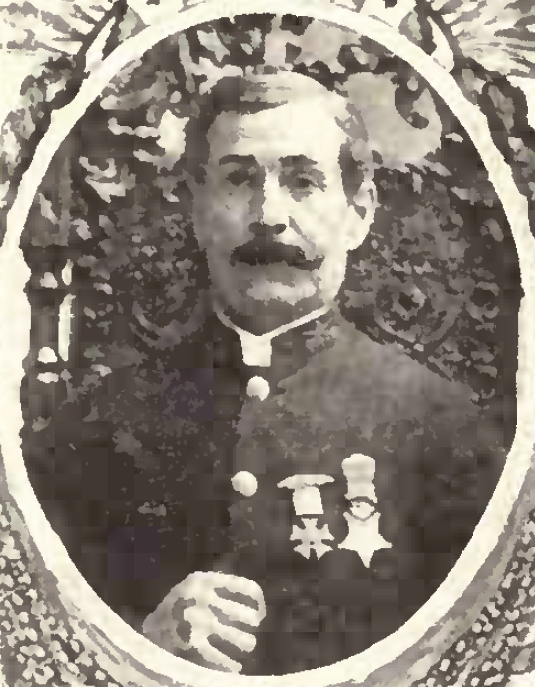
- Marcus M. Robbins, Medal of Honor recipient
- Born: July 25, 1851; Elba, Wisconsin
- Died: June 21, 1924 (aged 72); Pittsfield, Massachusetts
- Burial place: Pittsfield Cemetery
- Military career
- Allegiance: United States of America
- Branch: United States Army
- Rank: Private
- Unit: 6th United States Cavalry
- Conflicts: American Indian Wars
- Awards: Medal of Honor

Marcus Morton Robbins (July 25, 1851 – June 21, 1924) served in the United States Army during the American Indian Wars. He received the Medal of Honor.

Robbins was a resident of Elba, Wisconsin. He died at his daughter's home in Pittsfield, Massachusetts on June 21, 1924, and was buried in Pittsfield Cemetery.

== Army service ==
Robbins served as a private in the Sixth U.S. Cavalry, fighting in the Indian Wars.

On April 23, 1875, Robbins and five other soldiers snuck up behind a band of Cheyenne warriors and attacked them from the rear at the Battle at Sappa Creek in Kansas. He received a Medal of Honor for these actions on November 16, 1876. Several other members of his company also received medals for their role in the battle. Richard Longstreth Tea, Frederick Platten, James Lowthers, Simpson Hornaday, and Peter W. Gardiner made up the rest of the expedition around the Cheyenne lines, and all received the Medal of Honor. Michael Dawson and James F. Ayers also were a part of the battle, and also were awarded the Medal of Honor. The engagement was part of the Red River War.

Twentieth-century commentators have questioned the role of the Sixth Cavalry at Sappa Creek, with some calling it a "massacre."

== Medal of Honor ==
His award citation reads:

With 5 other men he waded in mud and water up the creek to a position directly behind an entrenched Cheyenne position, who were using natural bank pits to good advantage against the main column. This surprise attack from the enemy rear broke their resistance.

The medal itself was out of possession of Robbins' family for many years, until it was returned to them in 2009.

== See also ==
- List of Medal of Honor recipients
- List of Medal of Honor recipients for the Indian Wars
