= Cheyenne and Arapaho Indian Reservation =

Land granted to the Southern Cheyenne and the Southern Arapaho

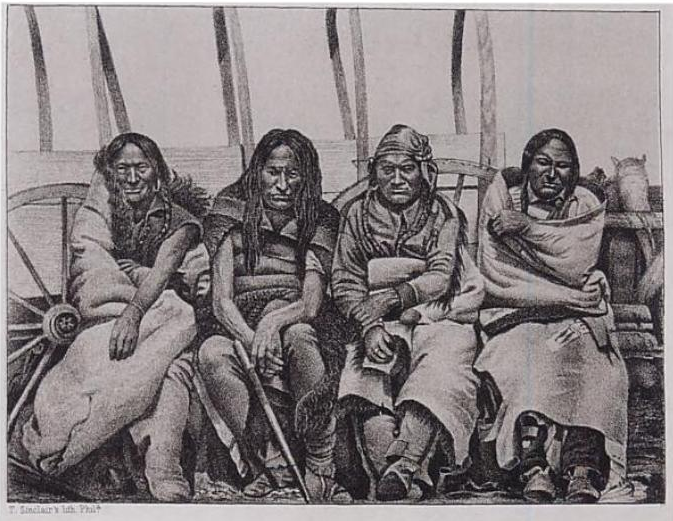
Principal Chiefs of Arapaho Tribe, engraving by James D. Hutton, c. 1860. Arapaho interpreter Warshinun, also known as Friday, is seated at right.

The Cheyenne and Arapaho Indian Reservation was the land granted to the Southern Cheyenne and the Southern Arapaho by the United States under the Medicine Lodge Treaty signed in 1867. The tribes never lived on the land described in the treaty and did not want to.

Recognizing this fact, on August 10, 1869, President Ulysses S. Grant issued an executive order to set aside lands instead on the North Fork of the Canadian River for the tribes, closer to their territory. The lands were located in western Indian Territory south of the Cherokee Outlet and north of the Kiowa-Comanche-Apache Indian Reservation. However, a portion of it was split off later to form the Caddo-Wichita-Delaware Indian Reservation. The area occupied by the tribes is now referred to as the Cheyenne-Arapaho Oklahoma Tribal Statistical Area.

== The last of the buffalo ==
Following the Red River War, nearly all the Southern Cheyenne and the Southern Arapaho began to live on the reservation. Despite the best efforts of the Indian Agent, John DeBras Miles, the promised government rations were inadequate. The tribes also suffered from infectious diseases. Congress appropriated inadequate funds for support of the reservations, and poor quality cattle were sold to the government. Texas cattlemen illegally grazed thousands of cattle on the reservation, but refused to sell any to the Indian agent. Some cattle were confiscated on promise of payment.

On the advice of the army, fearful of an outbreak, Miles withheld ammunition from the tribes. This made them vulnerable to white horse thieves. Cheyenne women gained some paying work by tanning hides for white traders. In 1875, 1876, and 1877 the tribes had to compete with white buffalo hunters for the last of the diminishing buffalo herds. Many buffalo were taken, but never enough to satisfy the tribes' needs; by 1877 there were few left. In the winter of 1877-78 the remaining stragglers of the southern herd were hunted down.

== Northern Cheyenne ==
In 1877 nearly a thousand Northern Cheyenne came or were escorted to the reservation from their home ranges in the north. Rations were inadequate, as was medical care. In September 1878, a band under the leadership of Dull Knife and Little Wolf escaped and fled north, in what became known as the Northern Cheyenne Exodus. Some were rounded up and returned to the Darlington Agency. Most of the Northern Cheyenne remained on the reservation in Indian Territory. By 1883 all who wanted to were permitted to return to the north, where the Tongue River Indian Reservation was established in 1884.

== Agriculture, education, and work ==
In the late 1870s and the early 1880s, both the Cheyenne and Arapaho attempted some subsistence farming. The Arapaho were more committed and successful. Recurrent droughts resulted in crop failures. It took several years for the US Indian agent and these farmers to develop and learn basic techniques of dryland farming to handle the difficult conditions, such as conserving winter moisture. Some men earned money by hauling supplies, making hay, and cutting wood.

Gradually more children were enrolled in the Indian boarding schools on the reservation and at Carlisle Institute in Pennsylvania. A separate facility patronized by the Cheyenne was established in Caddo Springs. But, the Cheyenne and Arapaho could find little work, even for Carlisle graduates who returned to the reservation. The Indian agent's promising attempt to build a cattle herd was ended when the Office of Indian Affairs commanded distribution of the herd. They gave each Indian head of household an average of three cattle, too few to be productive. Shortages of rations continued, and the Indian agent had few resources available to develop work opportunities for his charges.

== Grazing licenses, 1882 to 1885 ==
During the early 1880s, the vast majority of the reservation was licensed for grazing to large cattle outfits in 8 large parcels, at the rate of 2 cents per acre, about a third of the fair market price. They were not leases, as a legal lease of reservation land was forbidden by law. John DeBras Miles, the Indian agent, called a council of chiefs and cattlemen on December 12, 1882, to consider grazing permits, and believed he had obtained the consent of the vast majority of the representatives of the tribes. There was still strong opposition, particularly among the Cheyenne camped at Cantonment. They killed some cattle for food and also as cultural resistance. The soldier societies began requiring the Cheyenne to participate in medicine ceremonies and punished Cheyenne who farmed or sent their children to school.

Miles resigned on March 31, 1884. His replacement, D. B. Dyer, did not respect the Cheyenne and his relations with them were strained. His approach to disorder was to request troops, which were not provided. Escalating conflict continued between Indians and the cattlemen. In July 1885, by presidential order of Grover Cleveland, the cattlemen were ordered off the reservation, which was placed under military control. Dyer was replaced by an army officer, Captain Jesse M. Lee.

== Dawes Allotment Act ==
The lands granted by the Treaty of Medicine Lodge were extensive, setting aside a substantial portion of western Oklahoma for the exclusive use of the Cheyenne and Arapaho.

...The United States now solemnly agrees that no persons except those herein authorized so to do, and except such officers, agents, and employés of the Government as may be authorized to enter upon Indian reservations in discharge of duties enjoined by law, shall ever be permitted to pass over, settle upon, or reside in the territory described in this article....

In 1890, the United States, operating through the agency of the Cherokee Commission, acting under the provisions of the Dawes Act, broke the treaty. It allotted a 160-acre parcel to each household for subsistence farming. The remainder was classified as surplus and sold to settlers. At the time, the government believed that forced assimilation to the European-American farm model would help the Indian learn to fit into United States society, as would the associated extinguishment of tribal government and communal tribal interest in land.

The allotments were held in trust by the Bureau of Indian Affairs, which leased much of that land to settlers. This process took several years, but by 1910 nearly all the lands of the reservation were in the possession or control of settlers, leaving the Indians as a small minority of the population of the reservation and possessing only a small portion of their original lands. At noon April 19, 1892, the lands of the Cheyenne and Arapaho reservation were opened for settlement by homesteaders; the Indians retained 529,962 acres (2,144.68 km^{2}) located mostly along the North Fork of the Canadian River, the Canadian River, and the Washita River.

== Cheyenne ==
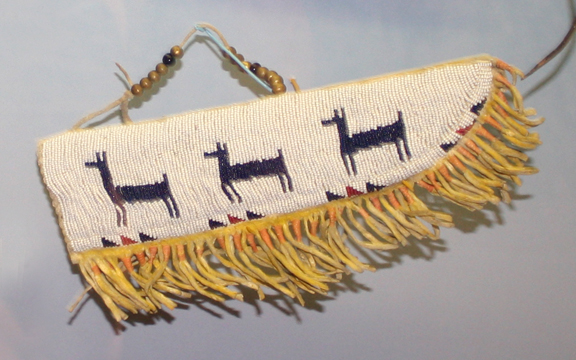
Cheyenne beaded knife sheath, Oklahoma History Center

In Oklahoma, the Cheyenne live near Thomas, Clinton, and Weatherford, Custer County; Hammon (Red Moon), Roger Mills County; El Reno and Concho, Canadian County; Kingfisher, Kingfisher County; Watonga and Canton, Blaine County; Seiling, Dewey County.

The Cheyenne are a Plains Tribe and are of the Algonquian language family. They have long been associated with the Arapaho. The two tribes are referred to in Oklahoma as the Southern Cheyenne and the Southern Arapaho, a reference intended to distinguish them from their respective northern divisions on reservations in Montana (Northern Cheyenne Indian Reservation) and Wyoming (Wind River), respectively. The southern bands were forced to move to the Indian Territory as a result of the Medicine Lodge Treaty of 1867, which was signed by Chief Little Raven as leader of the Southern Arapaho.

== Arapaho ==
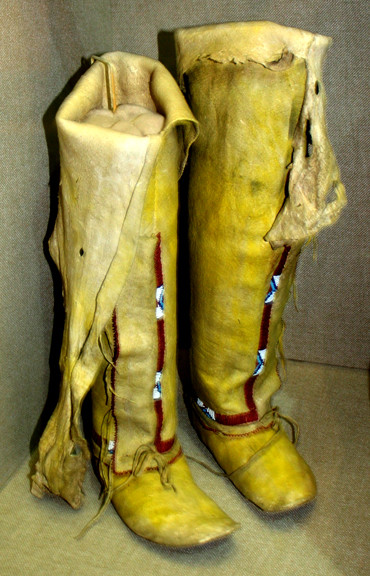
Arapaho women's leggings and moccasins, 1910, Oklahoma History Center

In Oklahoma, the Arapaho live mostly in rural areas near the towns of Canton, Greenfield and Geary in Blaine County, and at Colony in Washita County. The name Arapaho originates in the Pawnee term tirapihu (or larapihu), meaning, "He buys or trades", probably due to their being the dominant trading group in the Great Plains region. The Arapaho call themselves Inun-ina meaning "our people" or "people of our own kind."

The Arapaho are one of the westernmost tribes of the Algonquian language family. Members of the Northern Arapaho who live on the Wind River Indian Reservation in Wyoming call the Oklahoma group Nawathi'neha or "Southerners."

With the Organic Act of 1870, the Arapaho retained a nominal tribal government, and twelve chiefs were selected by a scout and retired Arapaho chief named Ute. The twelve chiefs were Jesse Rowlodge, David Meat, John Hoof, Dan Blackhorse, Ben Spotted Wolf, Bill Williams, Wilburn Tabor, John Sleeper, Annanita Washee, Scott Youngman, Saul Birdshead, and Theodore Haury. Two Cheyenne were elected by custom to serve as Arapaho chiefs, Ben Buffalo and Ralph Whitetail.
