= The Horsecatcher =

1957 novel by Mari Sandoz

- Author: Mari Sandoz
- Language: English
- Genre: Young adult historical novel
- Publisher: Westminster Press
- Publication date: 1957
- Publication place: United States
- Media type: Print
- Pages: 192 pp
- ISBN: 9780803291607

The Horsecatcher is a 1957 adolescent historical novel by American author Mari Sandoz. The Horsecatcher was a Newbery Medal Honor Book in 1958. The book is "dedicated to the two great Cheyennes named Elk River, both council chiefs and peace men, one Keeper of the Sacred Arrows of the Cheyenne Indians, the other the greatest horsecatcher of all the High Plains".

== Plot ==
The novel is set in the 1830s. Elk, a Southern Cheyenne adolescent, dresses plainly, does not care for ceremonials, has no interest in warfare and coup-counting and little more in hunting. He has undergone his fast, but nobody is quite able to figure out what his dream meant. He knows he is a disappointment to his father, Elk River, to his uncle Owl Friend, who founded a warrior society, and to his older brother Two Wolves. But he cannot help what is in his heart. He wants to be a tamer of wild horses.

Elk has slipped away from his village on a lone horse-hunt, hoping to catch Bear Colt. After almost getting accidentally killed by some of his own tribesmen, he succeeds. Over the next two years Elk learns his chosen profession. He bravely warns his village of approaching Kiowa raiders and kills one with his rabbit bow. After his brother is killed, along with his entire war party, he helps to save the tribe's great talismans. He then penetrates deep into Kiowa country alone to recover and bury the remains.

== Publishing history ==
This book was originally published in 1957 by The Westminster Press, and was republished in 1986 by The University of Nebraska Press. The book was also republished in German.

== Main characters ==
- Elk – Protagonist.
- Elk River – Elk's Father, headman of his band.
- Owl Friend – Elk's uncle.
- Two Wolves – Young Elk's older brother.
- Bear Colt – A black mustang with a white splotch on his side in the form of a bear.

== Film adaptations ==
As of 2016, the film adaptation of The Horsecatcher is in development.

== Critical reception ==
Many critics found The Horsecatcher to be a moving novel. The New York Times, asserted that "What gives this book stature ... is Elk's quiet courage in defying tradition and finding his own place in his tribe and in life". The Christian Science Monitor, emphasized that "Mari Sandoz has written a beautiful story that is bright with warmth, humor, and love of life. It will provide rich and rewarding reading not only for older teens and young adults but also for grownups with a taste for uncomplicated goodness". The New York Herald Tribune Book Review, avowed that "This is a moving novel. ... There is a fine sense of place, the wide plains, the canyons, the brushy gullies; a deep insight into the life of the Cheyennes and their firm and understanding way with their young people". Kirkus Reviews found "Though simply carried out, the story thread is strengthened by its very quietude, its thoughtful examination of an Indian mind and the interweaving of Cheyenne customs with the lives of other tribes: Comanche, Ute and Kiowa."

== Awards ==
- Newbery Medal Honor Book in 1958.
