= James F. Ayers =

American soldier in the U.S. Army

- Born: November 28, 1849; Collinstown, Virginia, United States
- Died: January 18, 1895 (aged 45); Fort Riley, Kansas
- Burial place: Fort Riley Post Cemetery
- Military career
- Allegiance: United States of America
- Branch: United States Army
- Service years: c. 1875–1895
- Rank: Private
- Unit: 6th U.S. Cavalry
- Conflicts: Indian Wars; Red River War
- Awards: Medal of Honor

James F. Ayers (1847 – January 18, 1895) was an American soldier in the U.S. Army who served with the 6th U.S. Cavalry during the Indian Wars. He was a participant in the Red River War and one of several men received the Medal of Honor for bravery fighting Indians at the Battle at Sappa Creek on April 23, 1875.

== Biography ==
James F. Ayers was born in Collinstown, Virginia. He later moved to Richmond where he enlisted in the U.S. Army. He was assigned to the 6th U.S. Cavalry and sent to the frontier where he took part in campaigns against the Plains Indians, particularly the Red River War, during the 1870s. He was cited for bravery while battle Indians at Sappa Creek, Kansas on April 23, 1875. He was one of several regimental members to receive the Medal of Honor, Ayers receiving his award for "rapid pursuit, gallantry, energy, and enterprise in an engagement with Indians" on November 16, 1876. Ayers remained in the military until his death at Fort Riley, Kansas, on January 18, 1895, and interred at the post cemetery.

== Medal of Honor citation ==
Rank and organization: Private, Company H, 6th U.S. Cavalry. Place and date: At Sappa Creek, Kans., April 23, 1875. Entered service at: ------. Birth: Collinstown, Va. Date of issue: November 16, 1876.

Citation:

Rapid pursuit, gallantry, energy, and enterprise in an engagement with Indians.

== See also ==
- List of Medal of Honor recipients
