= Susan J. Rosowski =

Australian literary scholar

Susan Jean Rosowski (January 2, 1942 – November 2, 2004) was a Western American scholar of literature and the works of Willa Cather.

== Life and education ==
Rosowski was born on January 2, 1942, in Topeka, Kansas. She attended primary school in Phoenix, Arizona, and obtained her Bachelor of Arts degree at Whittier College in Whittier, California, in 1967. She attended the University of Arizona, receiving a Master of Arts degree in 1967 and a Ph.D. in 1974.

Rosowski was married to James (Jim) Rosowski, a biologist at the University of Nebraska–Lincoln (NU). They had two sons, Scott and David.

In 1967 she accepted a teaching appointment at the University of Nebraska Omaha, and in 1971 moved to NU, where she taught courses in English literature, women's studies, women writers of the West, literature of the Plains, and courses on Nebraska authors such as Mari Sandoz and Willa Cather.

In 1973, Rosowski lost her left eye to metastatic ocular melanoma. The cancer returned in 2001, and progressed, causing her death at the age of 62 on November 2, 2004, in Garland, Nebraska. She had been a professor for twenty-two years at the time of her death.

== Career of editing ==
As Rosowski's career developed, her work focused more and more on Cather. In the peak of her career, she published book reviews and participated in professional and community presentations – most of which focused on Willa Cather – numbered in the hundreds. Her 70 scholarly essays explored authors such as Samuel Taylor Coleridge, William Congreve, Laurence Sterne, James Joyce, T.S.Eliot, and many writers of the American West, but she gave her scholarly attention to Willa Cather.

She served as Director of the Cather Project and editor-in-chief of the Willa Cather Archive, both of which were housed at NU, and also served as a general editor of the Cather Scholarly Edition, published by the University of Nebraska Press. Following this, she served as director of five international seminars on Cather and editor of 18 volumes or journals, many of which were about Cather.

Rosowski edited the Modern Language Association's volume Approaches to Teaching Cather's My Ántonia. She presented more than 100 scholarly papers and numerous speeches to communities primarily on Cather.

== Books ==
- Birthing a Nation: Gender, Creativity, and the West in American Literature. U of Nebraska Press, 1999.
- The Voyage Perilous: Willa Cather's Romanticism. U of Nebraska Press, 2001.

== Awards ==
Rosowski received multiple teaching awards, as well as the Mildred Bennett Award from the Nebraska Center for the Book (1994); Honorary Nebraska Author by the Nebraska Literary Heritage Association (1995–96); the Thomas J. Lyon Book Award for Outstanding Book in American Literary Criticism (2000); and the Outstanding Research and Creative Activity Award by the University of Nebraska (2004). The University of Nebraska created the Susan J. Rosowoski Professorship to honor her legacy and reward other professors for being like Susan.

== Legacy ==
Due to Rosowski's numerous contributions to Western American and Willa Cather scholarship, she was rewarded her with an award honoring Rosowski and her contributions. The Western Literature Association has established the Susan J. Rosowski Award for Creative Mentoring and Teaching in Western American Literature. The Association of Teaching Cather is also planning a volume of essays honoring Rosowski's teachings. There is a professorship that gives an annual stipend to factulty for their excellence in research and teaching.
