= John DeBras Miles =

American Indian agent

- Maj. John DeBras Miles
- Born: June 7, 1832; Dayton, Ohio, US
- Died: March 20, 1925 (aged 92); Fresno, California, US

John DeBras Miles (June 7, 1832– March 20, 1925) was an American Indian agent at the Kickapoo people Agency and at the Darlington Agency for the Cheyenne and Arapaho.

== Early life and family ==
John DeBras Miles was born at Dayton, Ohio, June 7, 1832, to David and Susanna (DeBras) Miles. His family were members of the Society of Friends and he grew up in Miami County, Ohio. He attended business college in Richmond, Indiana and when he was seventeen took a job teaching. When he was twenty years old he entered the merchandise and milling industry. On November 25, 1857 John married Lucy Davis in Grant, Indiana. Together they had eight children: Lena, Josephine, Susan, Whittier, Eva, John Herbert and James. On January 13, 1892 Lucy (Davis) Miles died in Lawrence, Kansas. On June 7, 1894, John DeBras Miles married Margarite Hedrick in Kansas City, Missouri. On January 15, 1922 Margarite (Hedrick) Miles died at Sutherland Springs, Texas.

== Indian agent ==
In 1868 President Ulysses S. Grant appointed John DeBras Miles agent of the Kickapoo people Agency in Atchison, Kansas. In 1871, he was assigned as special commissioner to Mexico. In 1872 john DeBras Miles was assigned to the Darlington Agency after the death of Brinton Darlington, there he was in charge of the Cheyenne and Arapaho for twelve years. Agent Miles resigned on March 31, 1884, his replacement was D. B. Dyer. Starting in 1884, he served as lawyer for the Cheyenne and Arapaho. In 1877 he was assigned as special commissioner to the Uncompahgre Ute Indians in Colorado.

== Death ==
John DeBras Miles died at his home in Fresno, California on March 20, 1925.

== Notes ==
Oklahoma Historical Society John DeBras Miles Bio
