= Colony, Oklahoma =

Colony, Oklahoma Ceensibeit (Arapaho)
- Town
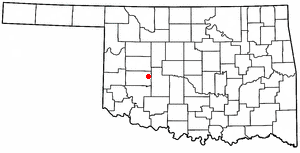
- Location of Colony, Oklahoma
- Coordinates: 35°20′55″N 98°40′17″W
- Country: United States
- State: Oklahoma
- County: Washita

Area
  - Total: 0.92 sq mi (2.39 km^{2})
  - Land: 0.92 sq mi (2.39 km^{2})
  - Water: 0 sq mi (0.00 km^{2})
- Elevation: 1,460 ft (450 m)

Population (2020)
  - Total: 112
  - Density: 121.5/sq mi (46.92/km^{2})
- Time zone: UTC-6 (Central (CST))
  - Summer (DST): UTC-5 (CDT)
- ZIP code: 73021
- Area code: 405
- FIPS code: 40-16400
- GNIS feature ID: 2413229
- Website: www.colonyok.com

Colony (Arapaho: Ceensibeit)) is a town in northeastern Washita County, Oklahoma, United States. As of the 2020 census, Colony had a population of 112. It was named for the Seger Colony, founded in 1886, which taught modern agricultural techniques to the Arapaho and Cheyenne tribes that would be resettled in the vicinity. Colony is 16 miles (26 km) east and 4 miles (6.4 km) north of Cordell.

== History ==
John Seger, a native of Ohio and a Union veteran of the Civil War, was hired in 1872 to work as a mason/carpenter to build housing and other structures for a school for Native American children at the Darlington Agency. Later, he began a colony for Native Americans with Arapaho Indians, who were joined later by several Cheyennes. By the following year, Seger's colony had over 500 inhabitants. Seger began teaching modern agricultural methods as well as brick-making. By 1892, the colony had also built an industrial arts school, with the Native Americans providing the bricks and cutting stone for all the buildings.

William De Lestinier opened a store near the school with government permission, even before the Land Run of 1892. After the opening, a group of settlers, led by Zack King, created a townsite 4 miles (6.4 km) west of the school and obtained a post office named Seger. De Lestinier moved his store to the new site. In 1895, the Dutch Reformed Church founded a mission at the colony. In 1896, a new post office named Colony opened, and the town took that name.

The colony continued to grow and had an estimated population of 300 by 1911. The Dutch Reformed mission closed in 1912 and the Seger Indian school closed in 1932.

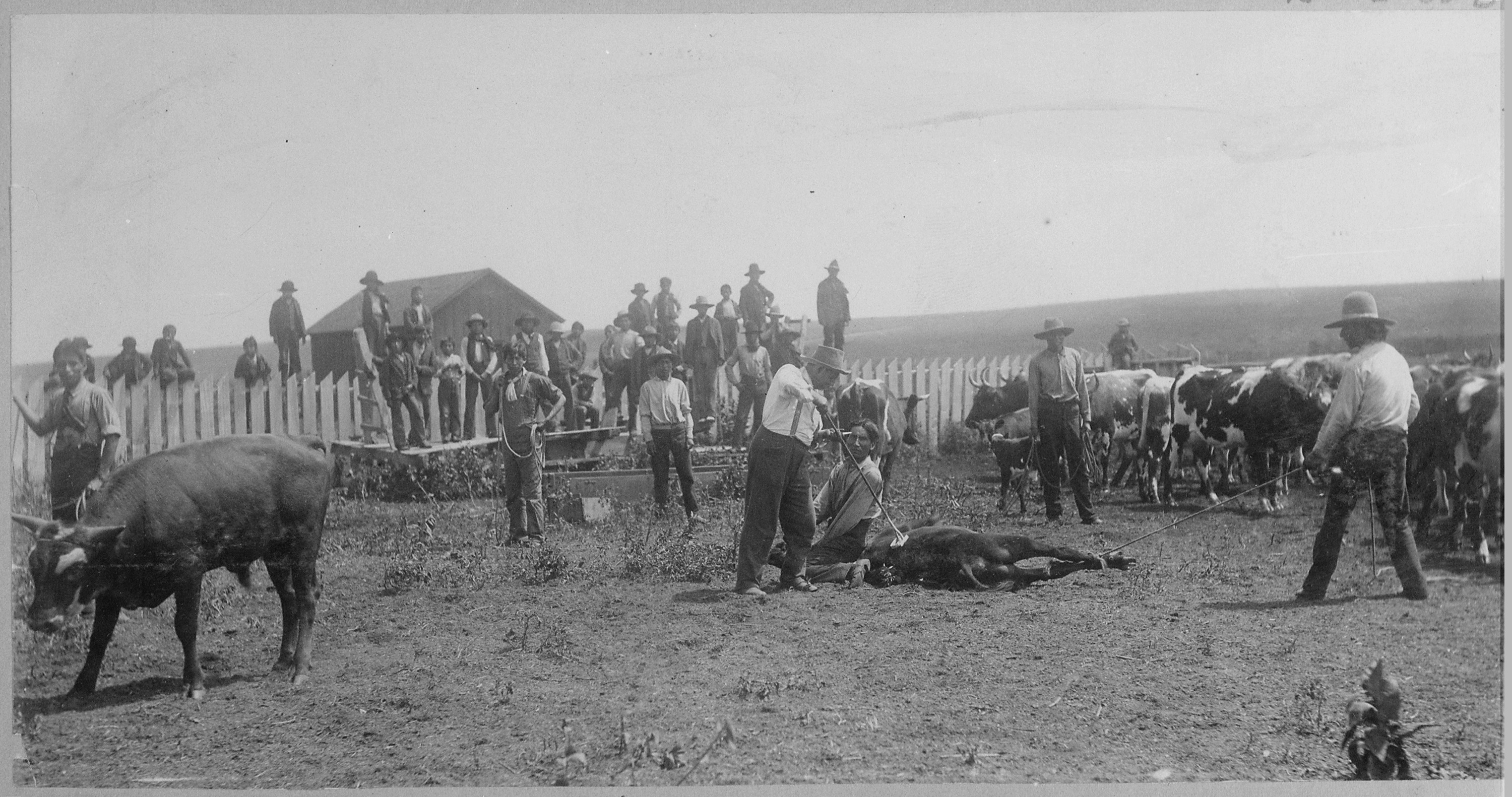
In 1900, students brand cattle at the Seger Colony

== Geography ==
Colony is located in Seger Township (T10N R14W), Washita County, Oklahoma. According to the United States Census Bureau, the town has a total area of 0.9 square miles (2.3 km^{2}), all land.

== Demographics ==
Historical population
Census	Pop.	Note	%±
1970	201		—
1980	185		−8.0%
1990	163		−11.9%
2000	147		−9.8%
2010	136		−7.5%
2020	112		−17.6%
U.S. Decennial Census

=== 2020 census ===
As of the 2020 census, Colony had a population of 112. The median age was 54.7 years. 23.2% of residents were under the age of 18 and 28.6% of residents were 65 years of age or older. For every 100 females there were 96.5 males, and for every 100 females age 18 and over there were 91.1 males age 18 and over.

0.0% of residents lived in urban areas, while 100.0% lived in rural areas.

There were 47 households in Colony, of which 31.9% had children under the age of 18 living in them. Of all households, 59.6% were married-couple households, 23.4% were households with a male householder and no spouse or partner present, and 14.9% were households with a female householder and no spouse or partner present. About 25.5% of all households were made up of individuals and 8.6% had someone living alone who was 65 years of age or older.

There were 61 housing units, of which 23.0% were vacant. The homeowner vacancy rate was 10.3% and the rental vacancy rate was 0.0%.

Racial composition as of the 2020 census
Race	Number	Percent
White	82	73.2%
Black or African American	2	1.8%
American Indian and Alaska Native	14	12.5%
Asian	0	0.0%
Native Hawaiian and Other Pacific Islander	0	0.0%
Some other race	1	0.9%
Two or more races	13	11.6%
Hispanic or Latino (of any race)	7	6.2%

=== 2000 census ===
As of the census of 2000, there were 147 people, 64 households, and 49 families residing in the town. The population density was 156.6 inhabitants per square mile (60.5/km^{2}). There were 79 housing units at an average density of 84.2 per square mile (32.5/km^{2}). The racial makeup of the town was 80.27% White, 10.20% Native American, 4.76% from other races, and 4.76% from two or more races. Hispanic or Latino of any race were 5.44% of the population.

There were 64 households, out of which 28.1% had children under the age of 18 living with them, 71.9% were married couples living together, 4.7% had a female householder with no husband present, and 21.9% were non-families. 20.3% of all households were made up of individuals, and 14.1% had someone living alone who was 65 years of age or older. The average household size was 2.30 and the average family size was 2.62.

In the town, the population was spread out, with 21.1% under the age of 18, 2.7% from 18 to 24, 21.8% from 25 to 44, 26.5% from 45 to 64, and 27.9% who were 65 years of age or older. The median age was 48 years. For every 100 females, there were 96.0 males. For every 100 females age 18 and over, there were 93.3 males.

The median income for a household in the town was $26,912, and the median income for a family was $27,426. Males had a median income of $26,071 versus $16,250 for females. The per capita income for the town was $18,106. There were 15.1% of families and 17.2% of the population living below the poverty line, including 23.5% of under eighteens and 21.6% of those over 64.

== Notable people ==
- Yvonne Kauger, a Justice of the Oklahoma State Supreme Court, grew up in Colony and graduated from high school there.
- Dale Mitchell, two-time Major League Baseball All-Star outfielder for the Cleveland Indians and Brooklyn Dodgers.

== See also ==
- Darlington Agency
- John Homer Seger
