= Cheyenne Autumn (book) =

1953 book by Mari Sandoz

- Author: Mari Sandoz
- Language: English
- Genre: Non-fiction
- Published: 1953
- Publication place: USA
- Pages: 290
- ISBN: 9780803292123

Cheyenne Autumn is a 1953 non-fiction book by Mari Sandoz. It is about the Northern Cheyenne Exodus, an attempt by the Northern Cheyenne to repatriate themselves to their homeland in and around present-day Yellowstone National Park.
