= Mari Sandoz =

American novelist (1896–1966)

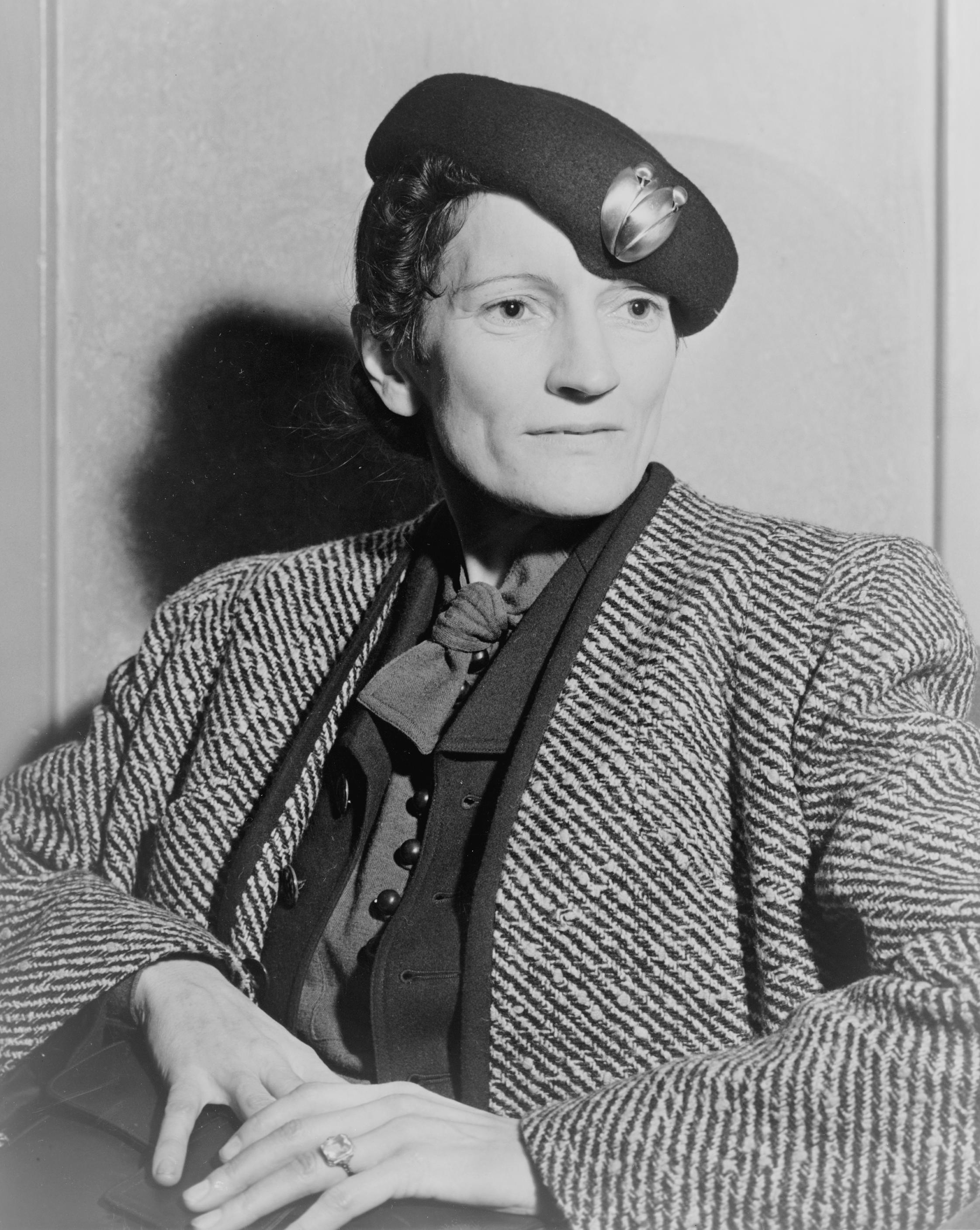
- Sandoz in 1938
- Born: Marie Susette Sandoz; May 11, 1896; Sandoz Post Office, Running Water Precinct, Sheridan County, Nebraska, United States
- Died: March 10, 1966 (aged 69); New York City, New York, United States
- Education: University of Nebraska
- Parents: Jules Ami; Mary Elizabeth (Fehr) Sandoz

Mari Susette Sandoz (May 11, 1896 – March 10, 1966) was an American novelist, biographer, lecturer, and teacher. She became one of the West's foremost writers, and wrote extensively about pioneer life and the Plains Indians.

== Early life and education ==
Marie Susette Sandoz was born on May 11, 1896, near Hay Springs, Nebraska, the eldest of six children born to Swiss immigrants, Jules and Mary Elizabeth (Fehr) Sandoz. Until the age of nine, she spoke only German. Her father was said to be a violent and domineering man, who disapproved of her writing and reading. Her childhood was spent in hard labor on the home farm, and she developed snow blindness in one eye after a day spent digging the family's cattle out of a snowdrift.

She graduated from the eighth grade at the age of 17, secretly took the rural teachers' exam, and passed. She taught in nearby country schools without ever attending high school. At the age of eighteen, Sandoz married a neighboring rancher, Wray Macumber. She was unhappy in the marriage, and in 1919, citing "extreme mental cruelty," divorced her husband and moved to Lincoln.

== Early writings ==
For the next sixteen years, Mari held a variety of low-paying jobs, while writing—to almost no success—under her married name, Marie Macumber. Despite her lack of a high school diploma, she managed to enroll at the University of Nebraska, thanks to a sympathetic dean. During those years, she claimed to have received over a thousand rejection slips for her short stories.

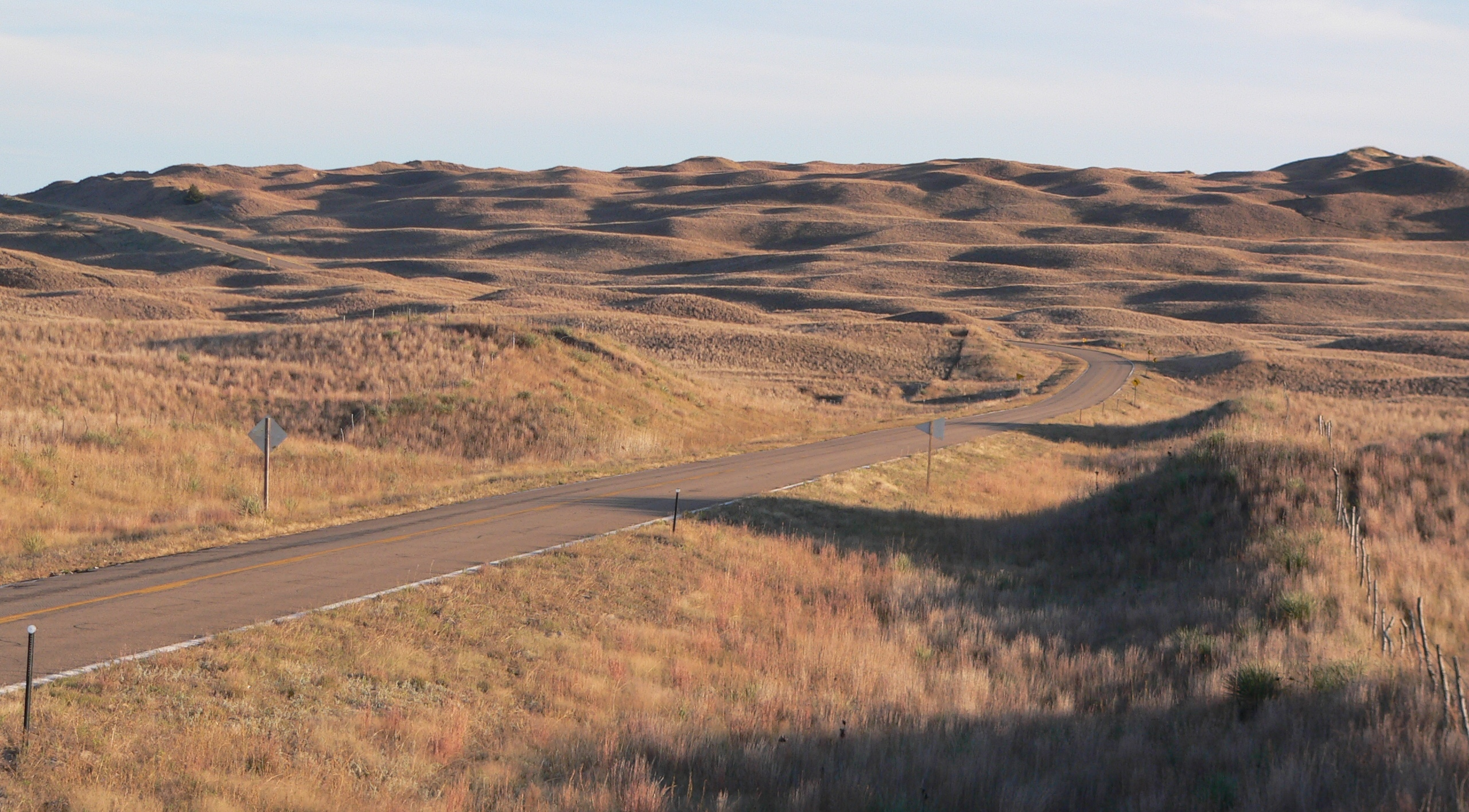
The Sand Hills of Western Nebraska

In 1928, when she received word her father was dying, she visited her family, and was stunned by his last request: he asked her to write his life story. She began extensive research on his life, and documented his decision to become a pioneer, his hard work chiselling out a life on the prairie, his leadership within the pioneer community, and his friendship with the local Indians in the area. The resulting book was Old Jules, published under the name Mari Sandoz, which she had resumed using in 1929.

In 1933, malnourished and in poor health, she moved back home to the Sand Hills to stay with her mother. Every major publishing house in the United States had rejected Old Jules. Before she left Lincoln, Sandoz tossed over 70 of her manuscripts into a wash tub in her backyard and burned them.

Yet she continued to write, and began work on her next novel, Slogum House, a gritty and realistic tale about a ruthless Nebraska family. By January 1934, she returned to Lincoln, and got a job at the Nebraska State Historical Society, where she became associate editor of Nebraska History magazine.

In 1935, she received word that her revised version of Old Jules had won a non-fiction contest held by Atlantic Press, after fourteen rejections. Finally, her book would be published. Before that happened, however, she had to fight her editor to retain the distinctive Western idiom in which she had written the book, as her publishers wanted her to standardize the English used in the book.

The book was well received critically and commercially when it was issued, and became a Book of the Month Club selection. Some readers were shocked at her unromantic depiction of the Old West, as well as her strong language and realistic portrayal of the hardships of frontier life.

== Later life and works ==
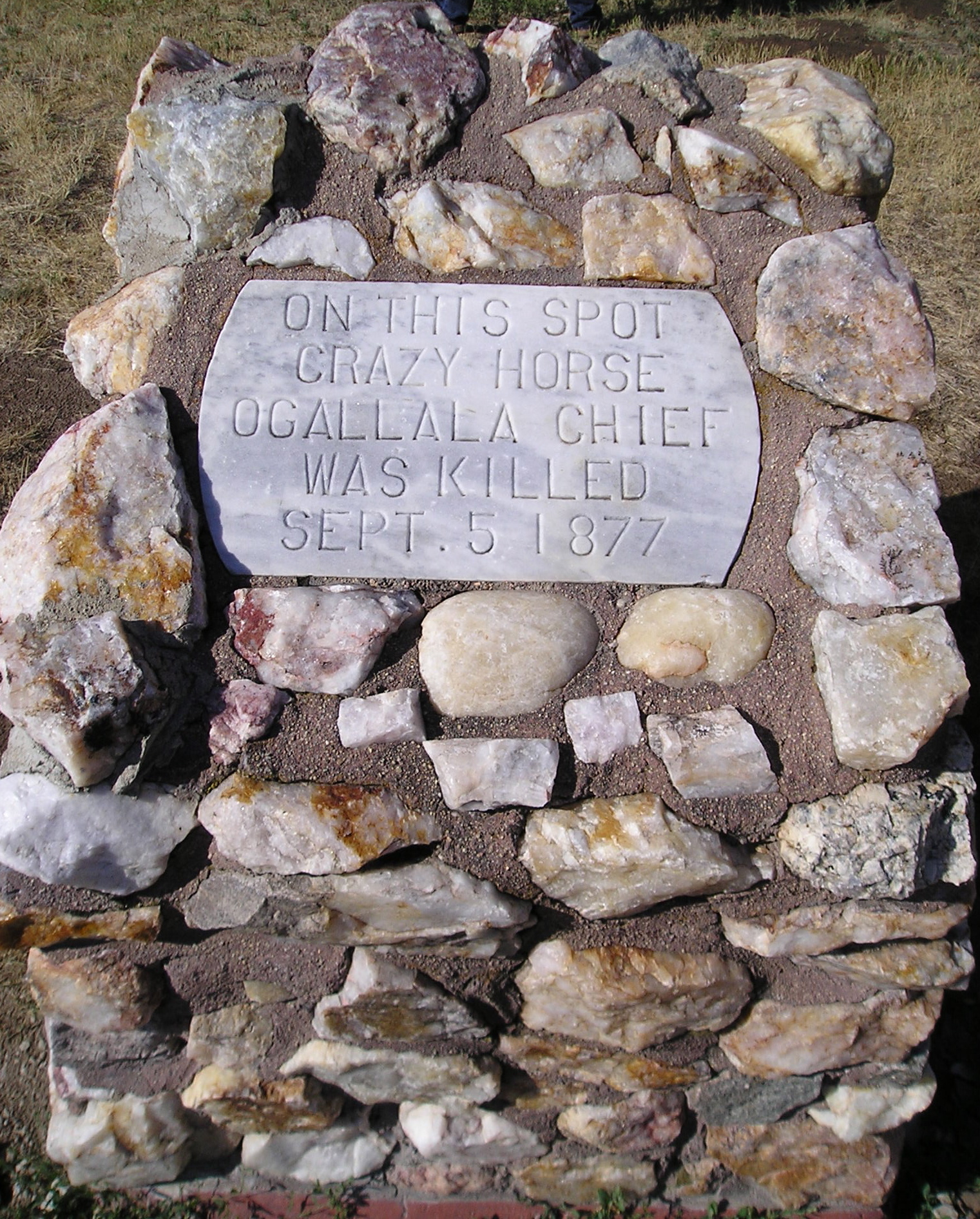
Monument honoring Crazy Horse at Fort Robinson in Western Nebraska, where he was killed in 1877.

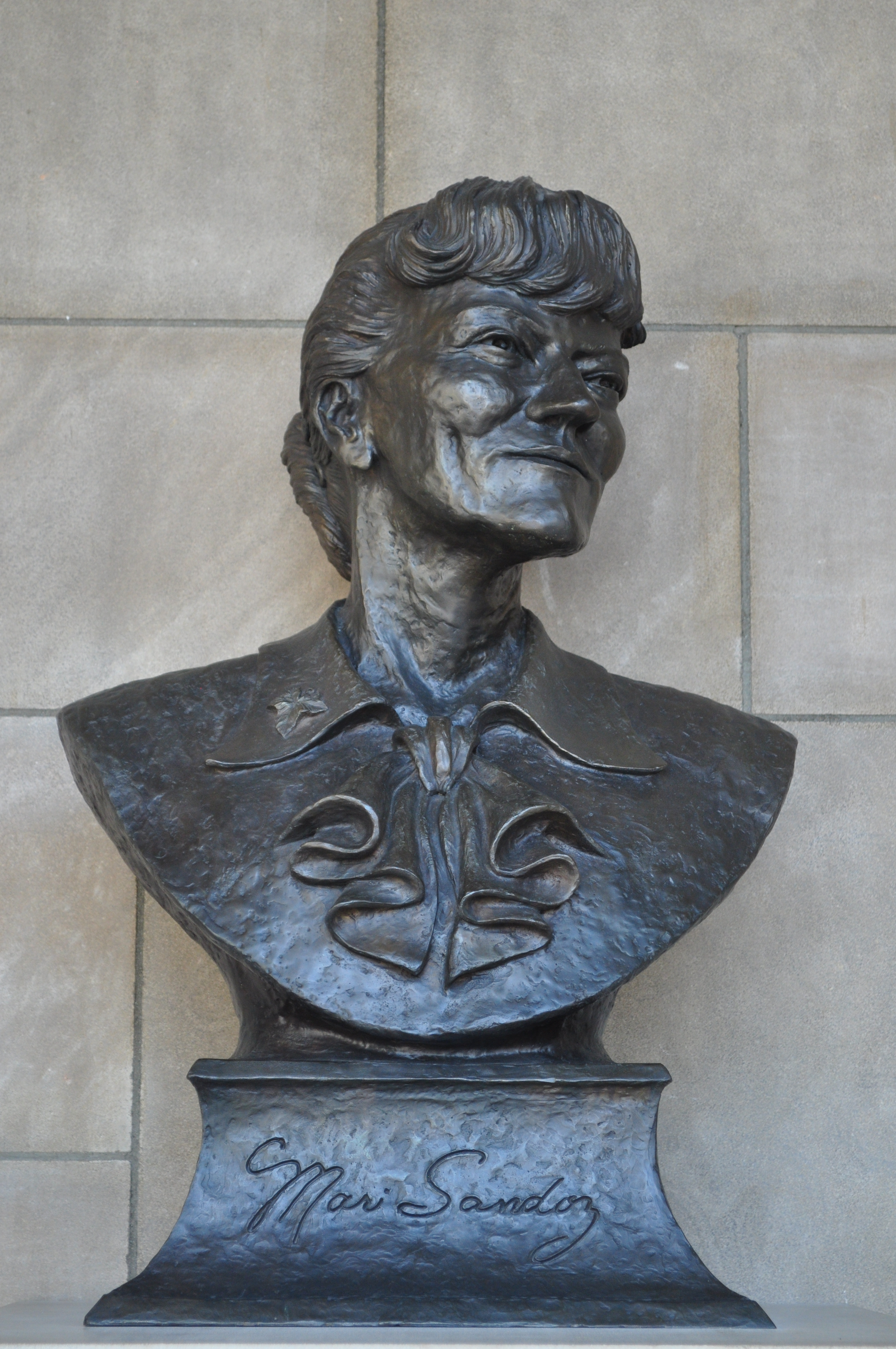
Bust of Sandoz created in 1980 by Mary Bryan Forsyth for the Nebraska Hall of Fame.

In 1937, Sandoz published Slogum House, a novel set in the Sandhills that warned about the rise of fascism. The novel was criticized for being dirty, and both the Nebraska cities of McCook and Omaha banned it from their respective libraries in 1938. During this time, Sandoz moved to the Shurtleff Arms at 645 South 17th Street. This is the only extant Lincoln residence of Sandoz. There she wrote her second novel Capital City (1939), which brought her notoriety of a different nature: hate mail and threats. Slogum House was considered an attack on the character of rural Nebraskans, and Capital City was perceived as an assault on the city of Lincoln.

In 1940, Sandoz moved to Denver, partly to escape the backlash, and also for better research facilities. Later, in 1943, she settled in New York City so she could access the research material on the West, and have proximity to her publishers.

In 1942 her monumental biography of the Lakota leader Crazy Horse was published. It is entitled Crazy Horse: The Strange Man of the Oglalas. Sandoz proved to be ahead of her time by writing the biography from within the Lakota world-view, using Lakota concepts and metaphors, and even replicating Lakota patterns of speech. Some critics consider it her greatest work. As she says in her preface to Crazy Horse:

I have used the simplest words possible, hoping by idiom and figures and the under-lying rhythm pattern to say some of the things of the Indian for which there are no white-man words, suggest something of his innate nature, something of his relationship to the earth and the sky and all that is between.

Her meticulous attention to detail, her in-depth research, and her admiration of the Plains Indian culture is also noticeable in later works such as Cheyenne Autumn (1953), The Horsecatcher (1957), and The Story Catcher (1963).

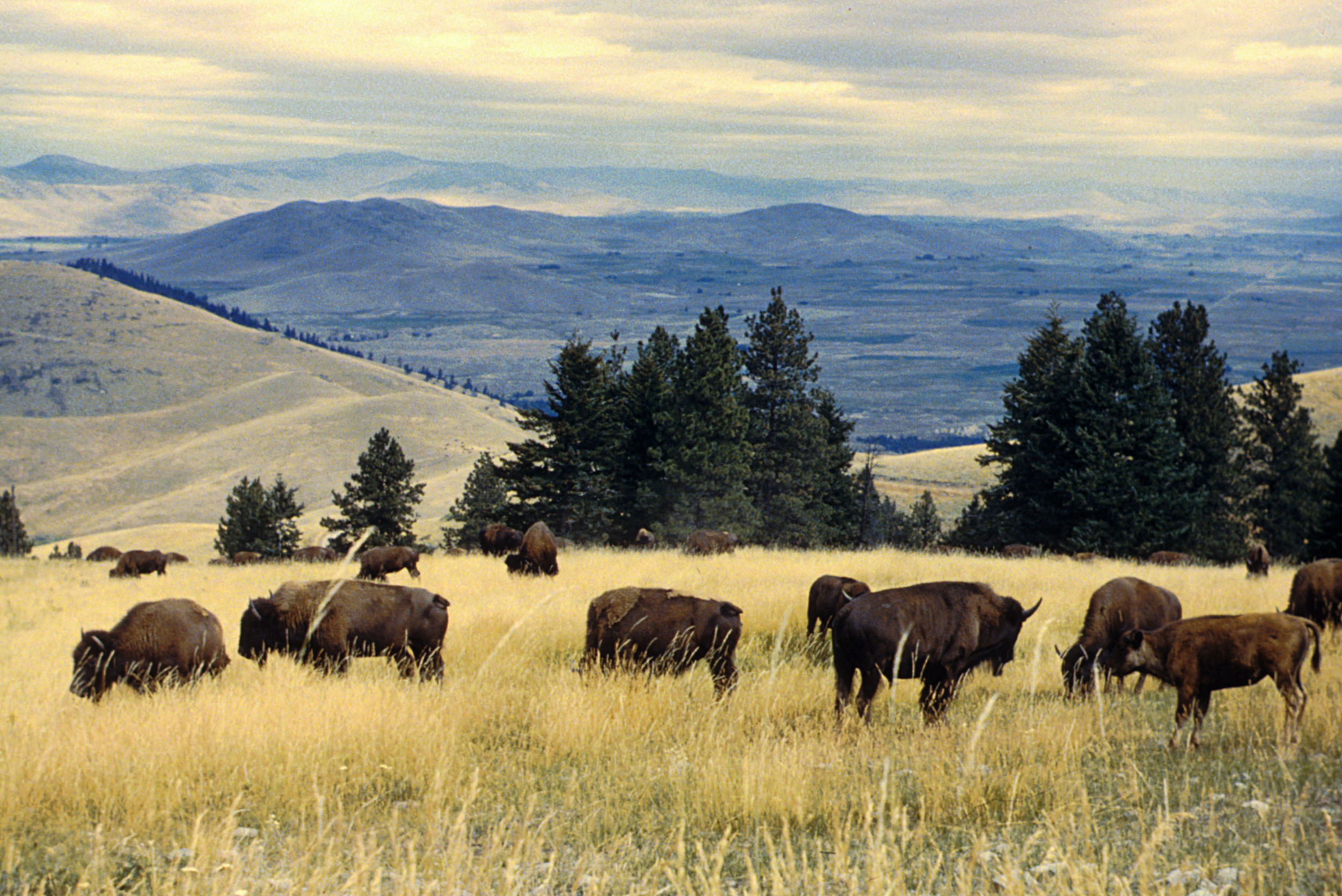
Herd of bison grazing in a Western meadow.

Three other books of her Great Plains series, The Buffalo Hunters (1954), one of her best known, and The Cattlemen (1958) and The Beaver Men (1964) each develop the history of the West in relation to an animal species.

Sandoz liked to encourage other writers. She presented summer writing workshops at institutions such as the University of Wisconsin–Madison, reviewed manuscripts sent to her by aspiring authors and provided helpful comments, and taught creative writing through programming produced by Nebraska Educational Television. She advised writers to "pick a subject you know well, and write about it." Sandoz kept writing, even within a month of her death from bone cancer in 1966.

By her request, she was buried south of Gordon, Nebraska, on a hillside overlooking her family's Sandhills ranch.

A bust of Sandoz, along with those of other members of the Nebraska Hall of Fame is displayed in the Nebraska State Capitol. Sandoz was inducted into the Nebraska Hall of Fame in 1976.

An historical marker placed by the Mari Sandoz Heritage Society is at the location where she lived while writing Old Jules.

== Awards ==
- 1950 - An honorary Doctorate of Literature from the University of Nebraska.
- 1954 - The Distinguished Achievement Award of the Native Sons and Daughters of Nebraska for her "sincere and realistic presentation of Nebraska as it was."
- 1958 - John Newbery Honor Medal for The Horsecatcher.
- 1963 - Spur Award for best Juvenile fiction for The Story Catcher.
- 1964 - Saddleman Award now called the Owen Wister Award for The Story Catcher.
- 1969 - The Mari Sandoz Award is established by the Nebraska Library Association. It is given annually to "significant, enduring contribution to the Nebraska book world through writing, film production, or related activity."
- 1976 - Inducted into the Nebraska Hall of Fame.
- 1998 - Inducted into the Hall of Great Westerners of the National Cowboy & Western Heritage Museum.

== Bibliography ==
=== Non-fiction ===
- Old Jules. Boston: Little, Brown, 1935; Lincoln: University of Nebraska Press, 1962.
- Crazy Horse: The Strange Man of the Oglalas. Lincoln: University of Nebraska Press, 1942.
- Cheyenne Autumn. New York: McGraw-Hill, 1953.
- The Buffalo Hunters. New York: Hastings House, 1954.
- The Cattlemen: From the Rio Grande Across the Far Marias. New York: Hastings House, 1958.
- Son of the Gamblin' Man: The Youth of an Artist. New York: Clarkson Potter, 1960.
- These Were the Sioux. New York: Hastings House, 1961.
- Love Song to the Plains. Harper & Row State Series. New York: Harper & Row, 1961; Lincoln.
- The Beaver Men, Spearheads of Empire. New York: Hastings House, 1964.
- The Battle of the Little Bighorn. Lippincott Major Battle Series. Philadelphia: Lippincott, 1966.

=== Fiction ===
- Slogum House. Boston: Little, Brown, 1937.
- Capital City. Boston: Little, Brown, 1939.
- The Tom-Walker. New York: Dial Press, 1947.
- Winter Thunder. Philadelphia: Westminster Press, 1954.
- Miss Morissa: Doctor of the Gold Trail. New York: McGraw-Hill, 1955.
- The Horsecatcher. Philadelphia: Westminster Press, 1957.
- The Story Catcher. Philadelphia: Westminster Press, 1963.

=== Essays ===
- 'The Kinkaider Comes and Goes: Memories of an Adventurous Childhood in the Sandhills of Nebraska.' North American Review 229 (April, May 1930):431–42, 576–83.
- 'The New Frontier Woman.' Country Gentleman, Sept. 1936, p. 49.
- 'There Were Two Sitting Bulls.' Blue Book, Nov. 1949, pp. 58–64.
- 'The Look of the West—1854.' Nebraska History 35 (Dec. 1954):243–54.
- 'Nebraska.' Holiday, May 1956, pp. 103–14.
- 'Outpost in New York.' Prairie Schooner 37 (Summer 1963):95–106.
- 'Introduction to George Bird Grinnell,' The Cheyenne Indians: Their History and Ways of Life. New York: Cooper Square, 1962.
- 'Introduction to Amos Bad Heart Bull and Helen Blish', A Pictographic History of the Oglala Sioux. Lincoln: University of Nebraska Press, 1967.

=== Collections of short writings ===
- Hostiles and Friendlies: Selected Short Writings of Mari Sandoz. Edited by Virginia Faulkner. Lincoln: University of Nebraska Press, 1959 and 1976.
- Sandhill Sundays and Other Recollections. Edited by Virginia Faulkner. Lincoln: University of Nebraska Press, 1970.

== Biography and criticism ==
- Clark, LaVerne Harrell. Revisiting the Plains Indian Country of Mari Sandoz. Marvin, South Dakota: The Blue Cloud Quarterly, 1977.
- Doher, Pam. 'The Idioms and Figures of Cheyenne Autumn.' Platte Valley Review 5 (April 1977): 119–30.
- Greenwell, Scott. 'Fascists in Fiction: Two Early Novels of Mari Sandoz.' Western American Literature 12 (August 1977):133–43.
- Lee, Kimberli A. I Do Not Apologize for the Length of This Letter: The Mari Sandoz Letters on Native American Rights, 1940-1965. Lubbock: Texas Tech, 2009.
- MacCampbell, Donald. 'Mari Sandoz Discusses Writing.' The Writer (November 1935):405–06.
- 'Flair Personified: Mari Sandoz.' Flair 1 (June 1950):66–69.
- Morton, Beatrice K. 'A Critical Appraisal of Mari Sandoz' Miss Morissa: Modern Woman on the Western Frontier. Heritage of Kansas: A Journal of the Great Plains 10 (Fall 1977):37–45.
- Nicoll, Bruce H. 'Mari Sandoz: Nebraska Loner.' American West 2 (Spring 1965):32–36.
- Pifer, Caroline. Making of an Author: From the Mementoes of Mari Sandoz. Gordon, Nebraska: Gordon Journal Press, 1972.
- Making of an Author, 1929–1930 (Vol. II). Crawford, Nebraska: Cottonwood Press, 1982.
- Rippey, Barbara. 'Toward a New Paradigm: Mari Sandoz's Study of Red and White Myth in Cheyenne Autumn.' In Women and Western American Literature, edited by Helen Stauffer and Susan J. Rosowski, pp. 247–66. Troy, N.Y.: Whitson Press, 1982.
- Stauffer, Helen Winter. 'Mari Sandoz and the University of Nebraska.' Prairie Schooner 55 (Spring 1981):253–62.
- Stauffer, Helen Winter. 'Mari Sandoz.' Boise State Western Writers Series, no. 63. Boise State University: Idaho 1984 available online via Western Writers Series Digital Editions
- Mari Sandoz: Story Catcher of the Plains. Lincoln: University of Nebraska Press, 1982.
- 'Two Authors and a Hero: Neihardt, Sandoz, and Crazy Horse.' Great Plains Quarterly 1 (Jan. 1981):54–66.
- Walton, Kathleen O’Donnell. Mari Sandoz: An Initial Critical Appraisal. Ph.D. dissertation, University of Delaware, 1970. (unpublished)
- Whitaker, Rosemary. 'An Examination of Violence as Theme in Old Jules and Slogum House.' Western American Literature 16 (Fall 1981):217–24.

== Additional resources ==
- Drake, Diane. The Sacred Hoop: The Hero and Community in Selected Works of Mari Sandoz. University of North Dakota, PhD thesis. 1992.
- Stauffer, Helen W, 'Mari Sandoz', Kearney State College.
- The Mari Sandoz Heritage Society
- Stauffer, Helen Winter, Mari Sandoz: Story Catcher of the Plains (University of Nebraska Press, 1982). https://www.nebraskapress.unl.edu/nebraska-paperback/9780803291348/
- Stauffer, Helen Winter, ed., Letters of Mari Sandoz (University of Nebraska Press, 1992). https://www.nebraskapress.unl.edu/nebraska/9780803242067/
