= Brinton Darlington =

American Indian agent

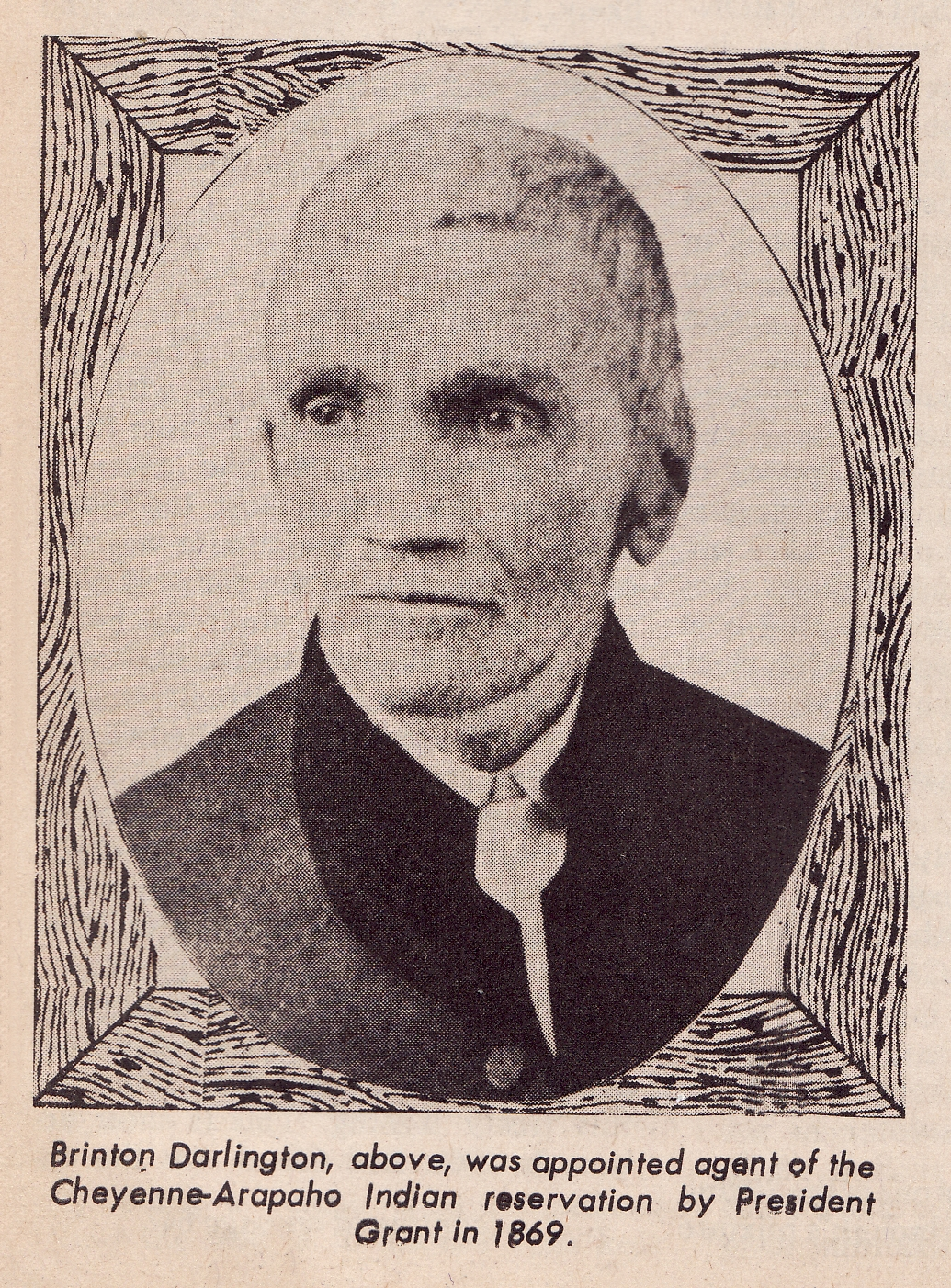
- Brinton Darlington
- Born: December 3, 1804; Redstone Township, Pennsylvania
- Died: May 1, 1872 (aged 67) Indian Territory, Oklahoma

Brinton Darlington (December 3, 1804– May 1, 1872) was an American Indian agent at the Darlington Agency for the Cheyenne and Arapaho tribes.

He was appointed by President Ulysses S. Grant.

== Early life and family ==
Darlington was born at Redstone, Pennsylvania, December 3, 1804, to Stephen and Rachel (Cattell) Darlington, and raised as a Quaker. On August 26, 1829, he married Martha Thompson and together they had six children, Rachel, Anna, Esther, William, Mary, and Elma. For a while, they lived in Salem, Ohio manufacturing woolen goods but after a loss by fire in 1842 they moved to Muscatine, Iowa. His wife Martha (Thompson) Darlington died in 1847. On November 18, 1849, Brinton Darlington married Amelia Charity Hall in Madison County, Iowa and together they had one child, Sarah Amelia Darlington. Amelia was a minister in the Society of Friends and she died in 1860. On September 10, 1863, Brinton Darlington married Lois Cook.

== Indian agent ==
On April 21, 1869, Brinton Darlington was nominated in the US Senate to be appointed as an Indian Agent. In May 1869 he was commissioned and appointed by President Ulysses S. Grant to the Upper Arkansas Agency, in the Indian Territory. He was the first agent for the Cheyennes and Arapahoes. Originally the Agency site was on Pond Creek but it was not a good location due to close proximity to the Osage and Kaws so it was moved outside of Fort Reno, which the tribes rejected. In 1870 the Commissioner of Indian Affairs in Washington told Darlington to set up the agency at the intersection of Chisholm Trail and the North Canadian River. In 1871, Darlington's daughter and son-in-law Jesse and Elma (Darlington) Townsend opened a day school at the Agency. Jesse Townsend was also the Agency's issue clerk. Brinton's son William T. Darlington worked at the agency, continuing on after his father's death. After Darlintgton's death, John DeBras Miles was appointed to replace him.

== Death ==
On May 1, 1872, Darlington died at the agency and was buried about a half-mile west of it. He was later moved to the Concho Cemetery. The Agency was renamed the Darlington Agency in honor of him. John DeBras Miles, agent of the Kickapoo Indians in Kansas was appointed as Darlington's replacement taking his position on June 1, 1872.

== Notes ==
The Darlington Agency historical site was named after Brinton Darlington.
The Darlington Historical Marker is located on US-81, two miles north of El Reno.
Canadian County Darlington Bio
