= Darlington Agency =

- Darlington Agency Site
- U.S. National Register of Historic Places
- U.S. Historic district
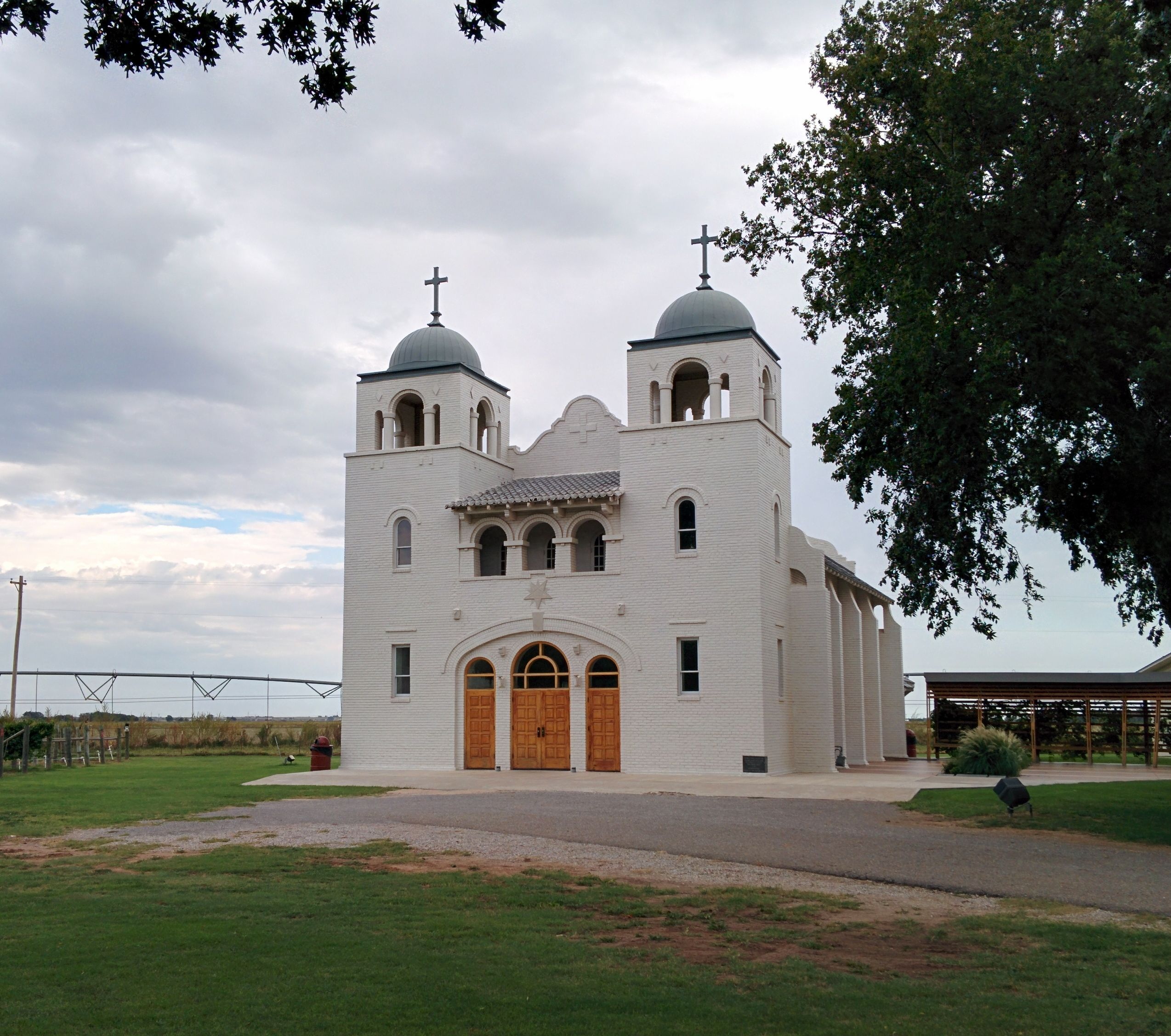
- Darlington Chapel

- Location within Oklahoma Location within the United States
- Nearest city: El Reno, Oklahoma
- Coordinates: 35°34′31″N 98°0′32″W
- Area: 3 acres (1.2 ha)
- Built: 1870
- NRHP reference No.: 73001557
- Added to NRHP: August 14, 1973

The Darlington Agency was an Indian agency on the Cheyenne and Arapaho Indian Reservation prior to statehood in present-day Canadian County, Oklahoma. The agency was established in 1870. The agency established at Fort Supply the previous year was moved to a more accessible location for the tribes. Brinton Darlington, a Quaker for whom the agency was named, was the first United States Indian agent at the agency, a position he held until his death in 1872. Darlington had traveled to the territory with his daughter and son-in-law Jesse and Elma (Darlington) Townsend, who opened a day school.

The agency gained a post office and an Indian school, the latter run by John Homer Seger. It became a stop on the Chisholm Trail. (Note: Agent Darlington had been selected to represent President Ulysses S. Grant's commitment to a Peace Policy.) By 1880, the agency had its own newspaper, the Cheyenne Transporter; it was the first in western Indian Territory.

The Cheyenne left in 1897 to form their own agency at Concho. When the Arapaho reunited with them, they both occupied the Concho agency.

The Darlington Agency site became the property of the State of Oklahoma after it was admitted to the Union. The Masons leased the site and operated a boarding school and retirement home there until 1922. The state briefly used the site as a drug rehabilitation center before designating it for the Oklahoma Department of Wildlife Conservation's main bird hatchery and research station. (Note: The NRHP nomination form also lists the site name as "Darlington State Game Farm.)

The site was added to the National Register of Historic Places on August 14, 1973.

== History ==
The Darlington Agency was established in 1870 on the Cheyenne and Arapaho Reservation in Indian Territory. Fort Reno was established near the Darlington Agency in 1874, at the insistence of Agent John Miles, to pacify the Arapaho and Cheyenne who had already settled there. At first, Buffalo Soldiers of the 10th Cavalry were dispatched from Fort Sill to establish an installation called “Camp Near the Cheyenne Agency.” They were reassigned to the Wichita Agency, 30 miles (48 km) south of Darlington, because of Indian unrest in that area. Troops of the 5th Infantry and 6th Cavalry from Forts Dodge and Leavenworth, under Lt. Col. Thomas Neil, were assigned to Darlington.

Neil was authorized to select a site on the south side of the North Canadian River, build corrals and a wagon yard, dig wells, and set up a sawmill for the military post. In February 1876, General Phil Sheridan named the new facility Fort Reno. (Note: The late Major General Jesse L. Reno, a close friend of Gen. Sheridan and a fellow Virginian, was killed during the Civil War in 1863 at the Battle of South Mountain in Maryland.)

In December 1876, the chief clerk of the Office of Indian Affairs. S. A. Galpin, inspected the Darlington Agency. His report was largely favorable to the post. He seemed especially impressed by the Indian school established there, writing that it was "... the largest, and in many respects the best, Indian school that I have found." At the time, John H. Seger was running the school for the second straight year, and had an enrollment of 115 students. Galpin noted that the school was in excellent condition, and that "... the furniture of which is as yet without a scratch made wantonly..."

In 1877, Dull Knife and 900 other Cheyenne were escorted by US troops to Darlington to be interned. The following year, most of this group escaped en masse and fled toward their northern homeland. Troops from Fort Reno and other posts pursued and captured most of the escapees and returned them to Darlington.

Troops from the fort were also used to protect the Native Americans, as they removed Boomers and ranchers who illegally trespassed or grazed cattle on reservation property. In 1889, the troops fought Sooners trying to sneak into Oklahoma before the land run officially opened.

By 1880, the Darlington agency published its own newspaper, the Cheyenne Transporter; it was the first in western Indian Territory. The Cheyenne left in 1897 to form their own agency at Concho. When the Arapaho reunited with them, they both occupied the Concho agency.

The Darlington Agency site became the property of the State of Oklahoma after it was admitted to the Union in 1907. The Masons leased the site, and operated a boarding school and retirement home there until 1922.

The state briefly used the site as a drug rehabilitation center before designating it for the Oklahoma Department of Wildlife Conservation's main bird hatchery and research station. (Note: The NRHP nomination form also lists the site name as "Darlington State Game Farm.)

The site was added to the National Register of Historic Places on August 14, 1973.

Fort Reno was declared a remount station in 1908. Its primary aim was to supply animals (primarily horses) to other military units. In 1938, cavalry units were already being mechanized and horses were no longer needed; the fort became used as a quartermaster depot. During World War II, Fort Reno became a prisoner-of-war camp for captured German soldiers.

In 1949, the facility was transferred to the U.S. Department of Agriculture (USDA) for use as a livestock research station. It has since been renamed as the Darlington State Game Farm.

== See also ==
- Battle of the Washita River
- Fort Reno
