= Northern Cheyenne Exodus =

Attempt of the Northern Cheyenne to return to the north

- Part of the American Indian Wars
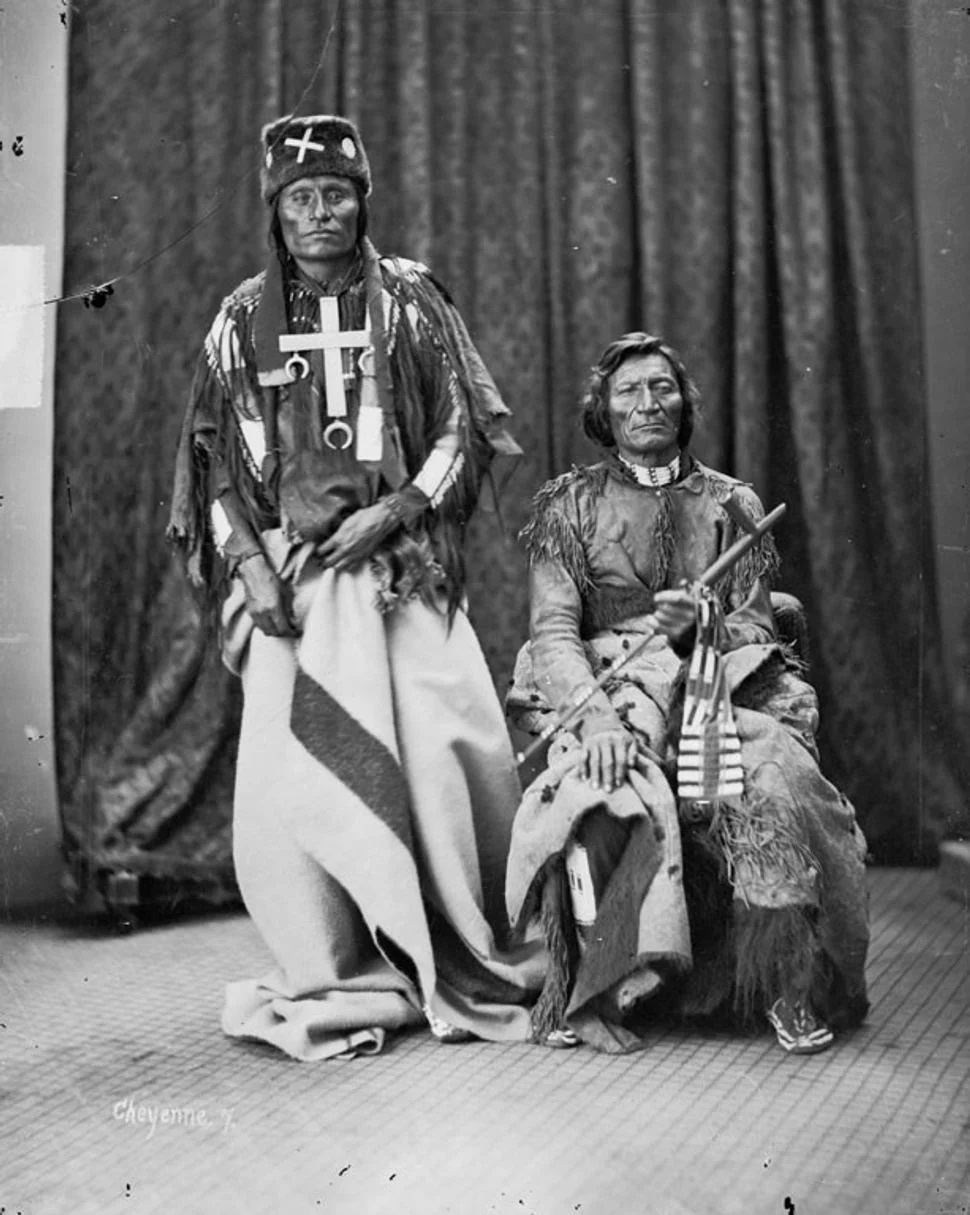
- Little Wolf and Dull Knife, Chiefs of the Northern Cheyenne
Date	September, 1878 – April, 1879
Location	Oklahoma, Kansas, Nebraska, South Dakota, and Montana, United States
Result	Northern Cheyenne Reservation created

Belligerents
Northern Cheyenne	United States

Commanders and leaders
Dull Knife; Little Wolf (surrendered); Wild Hog; Left Hand †; Little Finger Nail †	(United States) William H. Lewis † (United States) John B. Johnson (United States) Henry W. Wessells (United States) George F. Chase (United States) William P. Clark

Strength
297 people	~1,000 soldiers and civilians

Casualties and losses
~50 killed, ~30 wounded, ~70 captured	~30 killed, ~20 wounded
- Losses include civilian casualties. Northern Cheyenne population declined by 619 to 675 overall in the exodus due to poor reservation conditions. (Is the decrease incorrect?)

The Northern Cheyenne Exodus, also known as Dull Knife's Raid, the Cheyenne War, or the Cheyenne Campaign, was the attempt of the Northern Cheyenne to return to the northern Great Plains, after being placed on the Southern Cheyenne reservation in the Indian Territory, and the United States Army operations to stop them. In September 1878, about 300 Cheyenne men, women, and children headed north from their reservation, fighting and winning several skirmishes with the U.S. Army. In Nebraska, the Cheyenne split into two groups of about equal numbers. One group successfully reached Montana. The other group was captured and imprisoned in Fort Robinson, Nebraska. In January 1879 they escaped from their confinement and fled north. Most were captured or killed during the pursuit by the army, although a few escaped and remained on the northern plains. Seven Cheyenne warriors were tried and acquitted of killing white civilians during their flight. The Cheyenne who survived the flight were allowed to remain in the north.

== Background ==
Following the Battle of the Little Bighorn, attempts by the U.S. Army to subdue the Northern Cheyenne intensified. In 1877, after the previous November's Dull Knife Fight, Crazy Horse surrendered at Fort Robinson in northwestern Nebraska a few Cheyenne chiefs and their people surrendered as well. The chiefs that surrendered at the fort were Dull Knife, Little Wolf, Standing Elk, and Wild Hog with nearly one thousand Cheyenne. On the other hand, Two Moon surrendered at Fort Keogh with three hundred Cheyenne in 1877. The Cheyenne wanted and expected to live on the reservation with the Sioux in accordance with an April 29, 1868 treaty of Fort Laramie of which both Dull Knife and Little Wolf had signed. However, shortly after arriving at Fort Robinson it was recommended that the Northern Cheyenne be moved to the Darlington Agency on the Southern Cheyenne and Arapaho Indian Reservation near Fort Reno in present-day Oklahoma.

== Confinement in the South ==
Following confirmation from Washington D.C., the Cheyenne started their move with 972 people; upon reaching the Cheyenne-Arapaho reservation on August 5, 1877 there were only 937. Some elderly had perished along the way and some young men crept away and headed back north. After reaching the reservation, the Northern Cheyenne noticed how poverty-stricken it was, and began to fall sick in the late summer of 1877. When conditions did not improve after a federal investigation into reservation conditions, the Cheyenne were given authorization to hunt.

When the Cheyenne attempted to hunt game they found none: by the winter of 1877–78 the territory was just a wasteland of dead buffalo remains, as the U.S. Army had sanctioned and actively endorsed the wholesale slaughter of bison herds. Through the past decade the federal government had promoted bison hunting for various reasons, to allow ranchers to range their cattle without competition from other bovines, but primarily to weaken the North American Indian population by removing their main food source and to pressure them onto the Indian reservations during times of conflict; Unfortunately in 1878 there was also a measles outbreak that struck the Northern Cheyenne, and in August 1878 the Cheyenne chiefs began preparations to move back north. On September 9, 1878 Little Wolf, Dull Knife, Wild Hog, and Left Hand told their people to organize to leave. The runaways totalled 353 in all: 92 were men of fighting age, while the remaining 261 were women, children and elderly.

== Escape to the North ==
In the early morning of September 10 the band fled up the North Canadian River. By 3 a.m. the alarm was sounded that the Cheyenne were gone. Passing the present sites of Watonga, Oklahoma and Canton, Oklahoma they crossed north over the watershed into the Cimarron Basin, crossing the Cimarron River the evening of September 10. There, near the present site of Freedom, Oklahoma they rested and then trailed 11 miles up Turkey Creek to a waterhole called Turkey Springs in hilly country near the border of Oklahoma and Kansas. After a few hours rest there, Dull Knife and a few others led the women and children on to St. Jacob's Well and The Big Basin in what is now Clark County, Kansas where they camped.

== Battle of Turkey Springs ==
The remaining Cheyenne, anticipating pursuit, prepared an ambush at Turkey Springs. While one band prepared rifle pits at the springs, other bands fanned out over the country looking for supplies. In one case, attacking and killing two cowboys nearby, they obtained two mules. In another, attacking some cowboys during breakfast, they obtained both some food and a Sharps carbine.

On 10 September, a veteran soldier, Captain Joseph Rendlebrock, with 85 officers and men and two Arapaho scouts had departed Fort Reno with the objective of catching and capturing the fleeing Cheyenne. Rendlebrock reported that he was on their trail and, being well-mounted, that he hoped to catch them near the Arkansas River in Kansas near Dodge City. Instead, he found them waiting for him at Turkey Springs.

On September 13, following the trail of the Cheyenne, Captain Rendlebrock saw warriors on a hilltop. He formed a skirmish line with his soldiers and sent an Arapaho scout named "Chalk" or "Ghost Man" to talk to Dull Knife and Little Wolf. Chalk conveyed the message that the Cheyenne must return to the reservation, but the Cheyenne leaders declined to return and warriors began moving around the flanks of the soldiers. The soldiers opened fire and the Cheyenne responded in kind, although the firing was sparse as the Cheyenne preserved their limited ammunition. Desultory fighting continued all day with two soldiers killed and three wounded. After dark, desperate for water, seven soldiers attempted and failed to gain access to the water in the springs.

By the next morning the Cheyenne had completely surrounded the soldiers and Rendlebrock ordered a retreat through ravines with Cheyenne firing down at the soldiers. Another soldier was killed during the retreat. Rendlebrock retreated about 15 km (9.3 miles) to the Cimarron River. The Cheyenne suffered five wounded. The next day they divided themselves into several different groups to confuse pursuers attempting to track them and continued their trek northward. Rendelbrock was later court-martialed for the disorderly retreat.

== Battle of Punished Woman's Fork ==
Battle of Punished Woman's Fork
- Part of Northern Cheyenne Exodus
Date	September 27, 1878
Location	West Kansas
Result	Northern Cheyenne escape

Belligerents
Northern Cheyenne	United States

Commanders and leaders
Dull Knife Little Wolf	Ltc William H. Lewis †

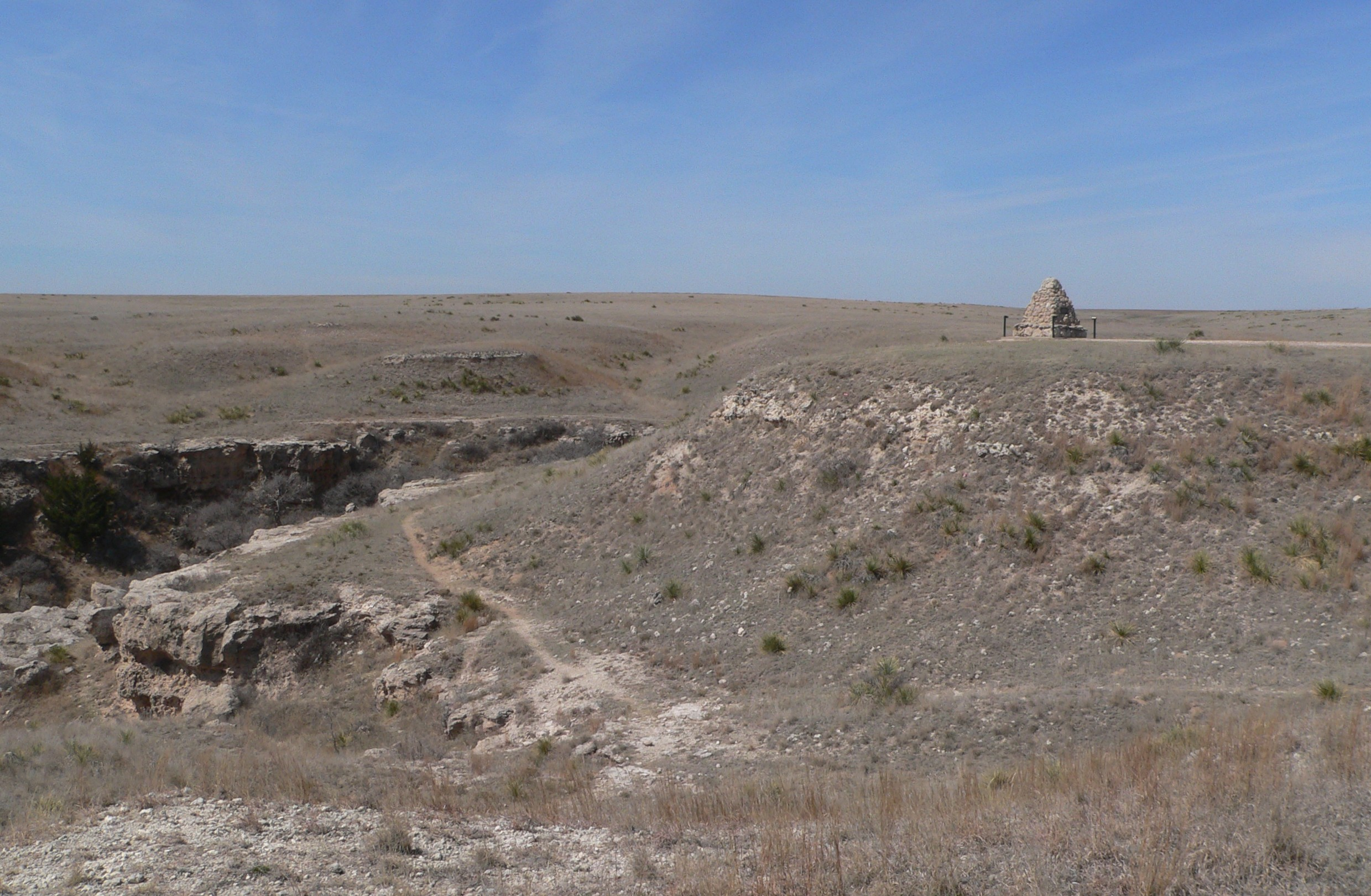
Battle Canyon, site of the Battle of Punished Woman's Fork.

After crossing the Arkansas River the Cheyenne were followed closely by a mixed command of 238 soldiers of the 19th Infantry and 4th Cavalry under Lieutenant Colonel William H. Lewis of the 19th Infantry. On September 27, the Cheyenne prepared an ambush in a canyon on Punished Woman's Fork (nowadays called Ladder Creek), north of present-day Scott City, Kansas, but it was aborted due to an over-eager brave who fired on the scouts before the ambush was sprung.

In the ensuing battle, Lewis deployed a company of infantry to block the entrance to the canyon and attacked late in the afternoon along the rim of the canyon with four troops of dismounted cavalry, advancing by bounds, pinning the Cheyenne including their families in the closed end below. However, Lewis was unaware of the Cheyenne's marksmanship and was shot in the leg, severing his femoral artery. This left a vacuum in Cavalry Regiment's leadership which the Cheyenne were able to exploit, escaping after dark. Lewis bled to death the next day and several other soldiers were wounded. However, the Cheyenne lost 60 horses, much baggage, and all of their food when part of the pony herd was discovered by the troopers.

== Depredations in northwestern Kansas ==
A party of drovers encountered Cheyenne camped on Prairie Dog Creek in northwestern Kansas on September 29 and lost 80 cattle. Between September 30 and October 3, in present-day Decatur County and Rawlins County near Oberlin, Kansas, then a tiny hamlet, small parties of Cheyenne foraging for horses, cattle and supplies fell on isolated settlers who had recently homesteaded along Sappa and Beaver Creeks. Some of the settlers, recent immigrants from eastern Europe, had never seen an Indian before.

Men and boys were killed; women and older girls were raped. Often the settlers were approached in a friendly manner, then shot point blank. About 41 white men and boys were killed and, according to a Kansas senate report, 25 white women and girls raped, although the latter number seems inflated given existing evidence.

Some observers link the autumn 1878 actions of the Cheyenne as being a response to an earlier Battle at Sappa Creek (also known as the Massacre at Cheyenne Hole), an action in the spring of 1875 in the same area when a small village of Cheyenne was surprised and destroyed by Army troops. Other observers stress that this link has no basis in Cheyenne accounts and trace the depredation back to the fact that elderly or injured Cheyennes who could no longer keep up with the pace of the exodus and remained behind had been mercilessly shot or clubbed to death by white posses and the fleeing Cheyennes had lost most of their ponies and all of their food in the Battle of Punished Woman's Fork, which created a crisis among the tribespeople.

== On to Nebraska ==
From Turkey Creek on it was a running battle across Kansas and Nebraska, and soldiers from all surrounding forts (Fort Wallace, Fort Hays, Fort Dodge, Fort Riley, and Fort Kearney) were in pursuit of the Cheyenne. About ten thousand soldiers and three thousand settlers chased the Cheyenne both day and night. During the last two weeks of September the army had caught up to the Cheyenne five times but the Cheyenne were able to evade the army by keeping to arduous grounds where it was challenging for the army to follow.

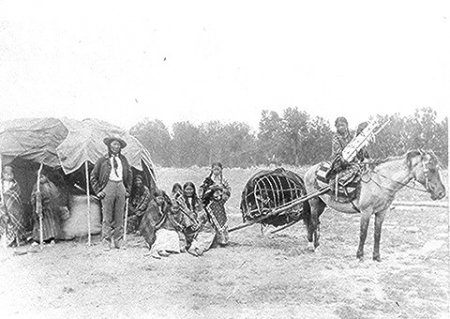
Stump Horn and family (Northern Cheyenne); showing home and horsedrawn travois

== Division ==
In the fall of 1878 after six weeks of running the Cheyenne chiefs held council and it was discovered that 34 of the original 297 were missing, most had been killed but a few had decided to take other paths to the north. This is where the Cheyenne split into two groups. The ones that wished to stop running were going along with Dull Knife to Red Cloud Agency, Wild Hog and Left Hand also decided to follow Dull Knife. Little Wolf continued north intending to go to the Powder River country.

=== Dull Knife's band ===
On October 23, 1878, Dull Knife's band of Cheyenne, only two days from Fort Robinson, were surrounded by the Army. After hearing that Lakota chiefs Red Cloud and Spotted Tail had been relocated to Pine Ridge in Dakota Territory, Dull Knife decided, due to weather and his people's condition, to go to Fort Robinson. That night the Cheyenne took apart their best guns with the women hiding the barrels under their clothing, and attaching the smaller pieces to clothes and moccasins as ornaments.

On October 25, 1878, Dull Knife, Left Hand, Wild Hog and the rest of the Cheyenne finally reached Fort Robinson. The barracks that had been built to house 75 soldiers now held 150 Cheyenne.

In December, Red Cloud was brought to Fort Robinson for a council with Dull Knife and the other chiefs. Dull Knife agreed to fight no more if the great father in Washington would let his people live on Pine Ridge that now held Red Cloud and his tribe. However, on January 3, 1879, the Cheyenne were ordered to return south to the Southern Cheyenne reservation. When the Cheyenne refused, bars were put on the windows and all rations were stopped, including wood for heat.

=== Fort breakout and aftermath ===
On January 9, 1879, Dull Knife still refused to return south. However, Wild Hog and Left Hand agreed to talk but said their people would not go. As a result, Wild Hog was held as a prisoner and shackled. At 9:45 that night the Cheyenne tried to make a daring escape using the dismantled guns they had hidden upon arriving at the fort. The Cheyenne were immediately followed and many were killed in the Fort Robinson breakout.

After the final battle at "The Pit". Painting by Frederic Remington, 1897

By morning 65 Cheyenne, 23 of them wounded, were returned to Fort Robinson as prisoners. Only 38 Cheyenne had fully escaped, 32 of whom were together moving north pursued by the Army. Six Cheyenne were hiding only a few miles from the fort among rocks and were found during the next few days. The other 32 Cheyenne led by Little Finger Nail were discovered in a small hollow above Antelope Creek, a tributary of Hat Creek some 35 miles northwest of Fort Robinson, and after a final battle only nine were left alive. The dead were buried in a mass grave called "The Pit."

In 1994 the Northern Cheyenne reclaimed the remains of all those killed and buried in Nebraska. They were reinterred on the Northern Cheyenne Indian Reservation, on a hill overlooking Busby, Montana.

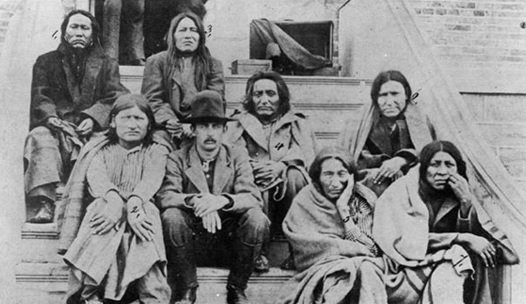
The seven Cheyenne sent back to Kansas in 1879 for murder, before all charges were dismissed. From left to right: Tangle Hair, Wild Hog, Strong Left Hand, George Reynolds (interpreter), Old Crow, Noisy Walker, Porcupine, and Blacksmith.

In January 1879, Dull Knife reached Pine Ridge where Red Cloud was being held as a prisoner. After months of delay from Washington the prisoners from Fort Robinson were released and allowed to go to Fort Keogh where Little Wolf had ended up. However, seven of the escapees had to stand trial for the murders that had been committed in Kansas. The seven were Old Crow, Wild Hog, Strong Left Hand, Porcupine, Tangle Hair, Noisy Walker, and Blacksmith. Charges were dismissed against them after a civilian court trial in 1879 in Kansas.

=== Little Wolf's band ===
After the council near the North Platte where the Northern Cheyenne split up, Little Wolf's band continued north to the Sand Hills of Nebraska where they wintered along Wild Chokecherry Creek where there was plentiful deer, antelope and cattle. They saw a few white men during the winter but were undisturbed. In early spring they moved north to the Powder River. There they were located by scouts attached to troops from Fort Keogh commanded by Lieutenant W. P. Clark, an army officer known as White Hat to the Cheyenne and who had been friendly with Little Wolf in the past. After negotiation with first the scouts, then later Lieutenant Clark, the band agreed to surrender and go with the troopers to Fort Keogh. There they were offered service in the army as scouts. After some discussion even Little Wolf agreed to become a scout, as did Red Armed Panther.

== Northern Cheyenne Reservation ==
In 1884, the Northern Cheyenne Indian Reservation was established in southeastern Montana Territory, and the Northern Cheyenne were never forced to return to the south.

== See also ==
- Nez Perce flight through Yellowstone
