= Murder trial of seven Cheyenne (1879) =

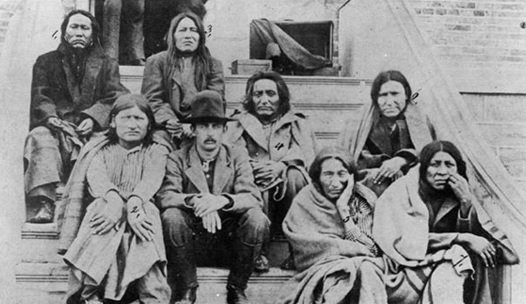
The Cheyenne prisoners in Kansas in 1879, from left to right: Tangle Hair, Wild Hog, Strong Left Hand, George Reynolds (interpreter), Old Crow, Noisy Walker, Porcupine, and Blacksmith.

The murder trial of seven Cheyenne took place in 1879 in Dodge City and Lawrence, Kansas. Seven Native American (Indian) warriors were accused of killing 40 civilians in Decatur County, Kansas. The killings took place during the Northern Cheyenne Exodus in which 353 Cheyenne men, women, and children fled their reservation in Indian Territory (later Oklahoma) and attempted to return to their homeland on the northern Great Plains. The imprisonment and trial of the seven Cheyenne took place over a period of eight months and was widely publicized and controversial. A judge concluded the trial by dismissing the murder charges on the seven. The Ledger art created by several of the Cheyenne while imprisoned is preserved in museums.

== Background ==
In 1877, nearly 1,000 Northern Cheyenne surrendered to the U.S. army at Fort Robinson, Nebraska. The U.S. government sent them south with a military escort to the Cheyenne and Arapaho Indian Reservation in Indian Territory. During their journey south, the Cheyenne stopped to rest for a week in Dodge City, Kansas and became acquainted with many residents, notably lawman Bat Masterson. Conditions on the reservation in Oklahoma were difficult and in September 1878, 353 Cheyenne men, women, and children fled the reservation with the objective of returning to their former homeland on the northern Great Plains. They defeated the U.S. Army and civilian volunteers in several skirmishes. After the Battle of Punished Woman's Fork, the Cheyenne needed horses and provisions and raided in the Sappa Creek valley of northern Kansas. Despite the orders of their leaders to avoid killing non-combatants, Cheyenne warriors killed about 40 civilians and raped nine women.

After a flight northward of 900 km (560 miles) from Oklahoma, one hundred and fifty of the Cheyenne surrendered at Fort Robinson in October 1878. Imprisoned and ordered to return to Oklahoma, in January 1879 the Cheyenne escaped Fort Robinson. Many were killed or recaptured in the Fort Robinson breakout. Seven surviving men were arrested for the murders in Kansas. They and their families, a total of 21 persons, were sent to Fort Leavenworth. Kansas Governor George T. Anthony demanded that the seven be tried in a civilian court and Bat Masterson escorted the Cheyenne by rail from Fort Leavenworth to Dodge City for the trial, arriving there on 17 February 1879. The journey was widely publicized with crowds at every railroad station to see the Cheyenne. The crowds were both curious and hostile. Several Cheyenne were injured in the melees. The women and children were sent onward to Oklahoma. The Cheyenne had "sympathizers in the East and opponents in the West."

The seven Cheyenne were Old Crow, Wild Hog, Strong Left Hand, Porcupine, Tangle Hair, Noisy Walker, and Blacksmith. Old Crow and Wild Hog were Cheyenne leaders. Some of the others were Dog Soldiers, the most resistant of Cheyenne factions to white settlement on Cheyenne lands. The seven were among the few Cheyenne men who survived the Fort Robinson breakout. Several of them had been seriously wounded, one had to be transported by wheelbarrow, and all were in poor health and believed to be suicidal. They anticipated they would be executed or lynched.

== The trial ==
The imprisonment and trial of the seven Cheyenne illustrates both the animosity and the fascination of white Americans with Indians. The Cheyenne were shackled and put in the Dodge City jail in the damp basement of the county courthouse. They remained there five months. Many people, including journalists from prominent publications in the eastern United States, visited them in jail and gave them cigars in exchange for interviews. Sheriff Masterson provided food and medical care, and later in their incarceration the Cheyenne were allowed to bathe in the nearby Arkansas River and stay outside in the jail yard rather than the basement. A lawyer, J.G. Mohler (Captain Jeremiah G. Mohler), represented them and claimed that the state of Kansas had no jurisdiction over them. Mohler summoned many witnesses on behalf of the Cheyenne, and the prosecution had difficulty finding eye-witnesses to the killings. The seven Cheyenne proclaimed their innocence.

The Cheyenne were visited in Dodge City by the Indian agent, John DeBras Miles, who knew some of them. Miles secured the release of Old Crow, who had formerly worked with the U.S. Army as a scout, and sent him back to Indian Territory to work on the reservation. The remaining six prisoners were sent to Lawrence, Kansas because the trial there would be more impartial than in frontier Dodge City. They arrived in Lawrence on 25 June 1879 and became local celebrities. Wild Hog proved adept in giving a positive image of the Cheyenne to journalists. The Cheyenne attended a circus and participated in a rodeo, enacting a mock battle on horseback with local cowboys. Several prominent Kansans offered to testify on their behalf. Poet Walt Whitman visited them in jail. A committee of the United States Senate interviewed them on 12 August and Wild Hog presented his case of mistreatment of the Cheyenne while at the reservation in Indian Territory. Wild Hog's wife and daughters were allowed to visit him in jail and he gave the Mayor of Lawrence a collection of his wife's beadwork which found its way to the University of Kansas.

On 13 October 1879, the prosecuting attorney failed to appear in court and the presiding judge dismissed all charges against the Cheyenne. They were still considered prisoners of war, and were taken to the Cheyenne reservation in Indian Territory. Four years later most of them received permission to go to their northern homeland and reside on the newly created Northern Cheyenne Indian Reservation.

== Ledger art ==
Plains Indians in the 19th century often drew pictures in small notebooks or ledger books with pencils, colored pencils, and crayons. These small and light-weight materials suited their nomadic life. In prison, the seven incarcerated Cheyenne created ledger books of drawings depicting their lives on the plains. The most popular subject for Plains Indians in ledger books was war, but these Cheyenne avoided that subject, perhaps aware that warlike depictions in their art could prejudice their cases. Four small ledgers and four pieces of loose drawings survive. One of the ledgers is attributed to Wild Hog, one to Porcupine, one to Wild Hog and others, and one has no attribution. Two ledgers are preserved by the Kansas State Historical Society and two are in Norway.
