= Battle of Turkey Springs =

Coordinates: 36.9°N 99.0°W

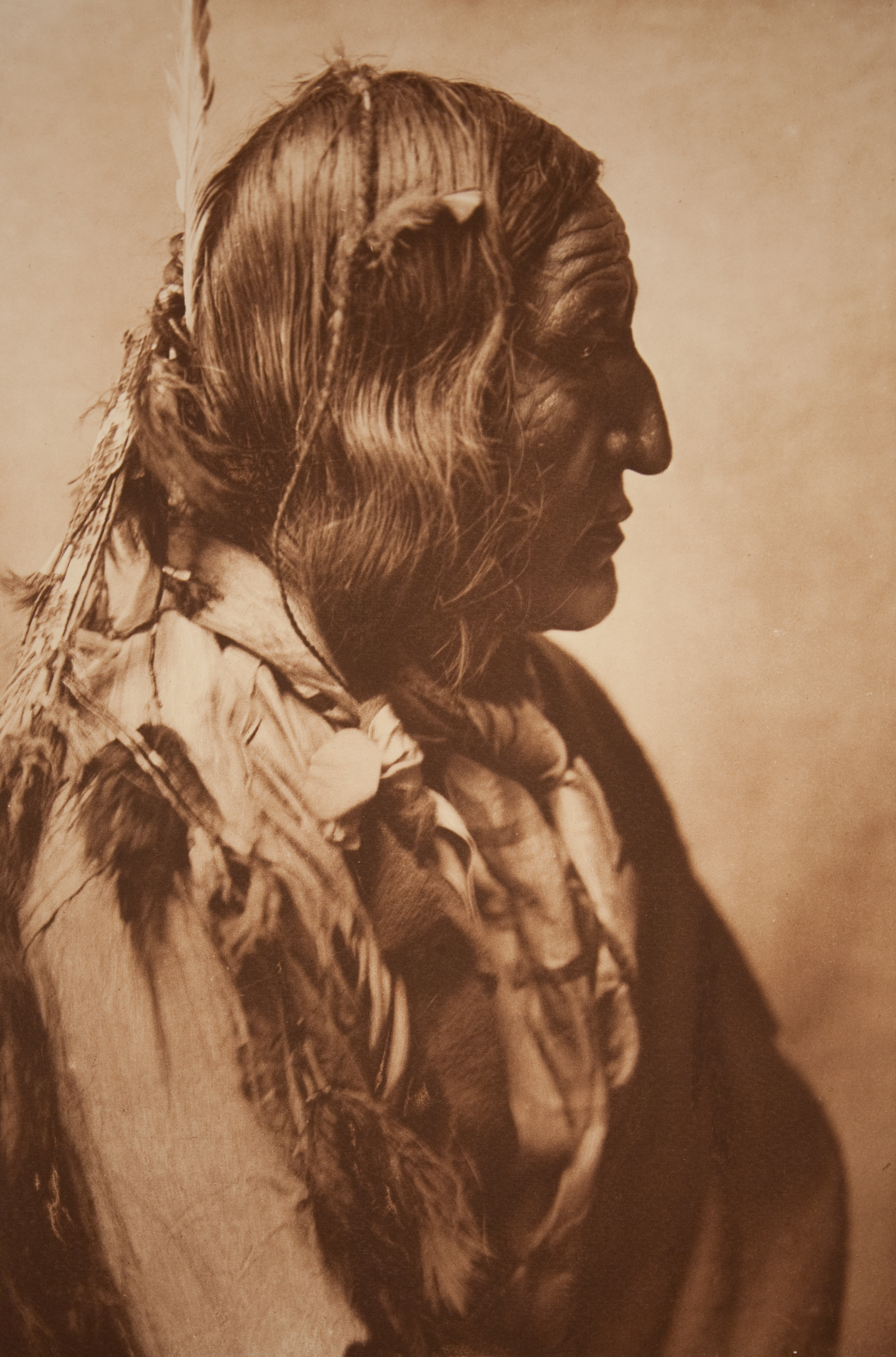
- Little Wolf
Date	13–14 September 1878
Location	Near Freedom, Oklahoma, United States
Result	Cheyenne victory

Belligerents
United States	Cheyenne

Commanders and leaders
Capt. Joseph Rendlebrock	Dull Knife, Little Wolf

Strength
86 soldiers; two Arapaho scouts	92 warriors

Casualties and losses
3 killed, 3 wounded	5 wounded
- Location within Oklahoma

- Turkey Springs Battlefield
- U.S. National Register of Historic Places
- Location: Freedom, Oklahoma
- Area: 145 acres (59 ha)
- NRHP reference No.: 100011885
- Added to NRHP: June 5, 2025

The Battle of Turkey Springs (13–14 September 1878) was the last battle between Native Americans (Indians) and the United States Army in the state of Oklahoma. In the Northern Cheyenne Exodus, 353 Cheyenne Indians, fleeing their reservation in Oklahoma in an attempt to return to their homeland in the northern Great Plains, fought a unit of the United States Army, killing three soldiers. After the battle the Cheyenne continued northward skirmishing with the army along the way. Some were successful in reaching their relatives in Montana. Others were captured or killed near Camp Robinson, Nebraska.

== Background ==
In the 1830s the Cheyenne tribe split into two groups: the Northern Cheyenne and the Southern Cheyenne. The Dull Knife and Little Wolf bands of the Northern Cheyenne were defeated by the U.S. Cavalry in the Dull Knife Fight in November 1876. Chiefs Dull Knife (also known as Morning Star) and Little Wolf and their followers subsequently surrendered to the U.S. at Camp Robinson, Nebraska. From May to August 1877, the Northern Cheyenne were escorted by soldiers 1,300 km (810 miles) south to the Southern Cheyenne reservation in Oklahoma. Nine-hundred and thirty seven Cheyenne arrived at the reservation, headquartered about 50 kilometres (31 miles) west of present-day Oklahoma City near Fort Reno. Conditions were difficult with shortages of food and outbreaks of measles and malaria. Dull Knife and Little Wolf pleaded to be allowed to return to the northern plains but were turned down. In September 1878, the two leaders and 350 of their followers fled the reservation with the intent of journeying to rejoin other groups of Northern Cheyenne who resided mostly in Montana. Ninety-two of those fleeing the reservation were warriors; the remainder were women, children, and elderly.

On 10 September, a veteran soldier, Captain Joseph Rendlebrock, with 85 officers and men and two Arapaho scouts departed Fort Reno with the objective of catching and capturing the fleeing Cheyenne. Rendlebrock reported that he was on the trail of the Cheyenne, but that they were well-mounted and that he hoped to catch them near the Arkansas River in Kansas near Dodge City. Instead, he found the Cheyenne waiting for him at a waterhole called Turkey Springs in hilly country near the border of Oklahoma and Kansas. The Cheyenne had killed two cowboys nearby.

== The battle ==
On September 13, following the trail of the Cheyenne, Captain Rendlebrock saw Cheyenne warriors on a hilltop. He formed a skirmish line with his soldiers and sent an Arapaho scout named "Chalk" or "Ghost Man" to talk to Dull Knife and Little Wolf. Chalk conveyed the message that the Cheyenne must return to the reservation. The Cheyenne leaders declined to return and warriors began moving around the flanks of the soldiers. The soldiers opened fire and the Cheyenne responded in kind, although the firing was sparse as the Cheyenne preserved their limited ammunition. Desultory fighting continued all day with two soldiers killed and three wounded. After dark, desperate for water, seven soldiers attempted and failed to gain access to the water in the springs.

By the next morning the Cheyenne had completely surrounded the soldiers and Rendlebrock ordered a retreat through ravines with Cheyenne firing down at the soldiers. Another soldier was killed during the retreat. Rendlebrock retreated about 15 km (9.3 miles) to the Cimarron River. The Cheyenne suffered five wounded. The next day they divided themselves into several different groups to confuse pursuers attempting to track them and continued their trek northward. Rendelbrock was later court-martialed for the disorderly retreat.

== Aftermath ==
The Cheyenne continued their flight northward, fighting and winning several skirmishes with the U.S. Army, including the Battle of Punished Woman's Fork, and killing seven cowboys in southern Kansas. A total of 1,300 soldiers and a few civilians took to the field in the attempt to capture them. In Nebraska, the Cheyenne split into two groups with Little Wolf taking one-half with him and successfully joining the Northern Cheyenne in Montana. Dull Knife with the other half attempted to join the Sioux in South Dakota, but were captured and imprisoned at Camp Robinson, Nebraska. In January 1879, in bitterly cold weather, in the Fort Robinson breakout, 149 Cheyenne escaped from Camp Robinson and fled westward. They were pursued by soldiers and nearly all of them were either killed or captured. The survivors of the Northern Cheyenne Exodus were allowed to remain in their homeland on the northern plains.
