= Red Armed Panther =

19th-century Cheyenne leader

- Ma'ena'éváhe

Northern Cheyenne scout

Personal details
- Died: Muddy Cluster district on the Northern Cheyenne Reservation
- Relations: Six sisters and a brother, William Yellowrobe. His eldest sister was Wolf Woman, Elk Woman was the second eldest, and Medicine Woman was the third oldest. Other sisters were Young Medicine Woman, Buffalo Woman, and Mrs. Ford Wounded Eye.
- Children: Shell Woman and “Man Bear,” known as John Red Sleeve
- Known for: Northern Cheyenne Scout at Fort Keogh; member of the Council of Forty-four and the Elkhorn Scrapers; active during Little Wolf’s trail back to the homeland
- Nickname(s): Red Sleeve (also known as Red Around the Mouth, Red Arm, and Bloody Arm)

Red Armed Panther (Cheyenne: Ma'ena'éváhe; also known as Red Sleeve, Red Around the Mouth, Red Arm, and Bloody Arm), was a Northern Cheyenne Scout at Fort Keogh during the late 1870s. He was brought into the Chiefs Council of Forty-four during the summer of 1864. He actively participated during Chief Little Wolf’s trail back to the homeland, which is now the Northern Cheyenne Reservation located in the south eastern part of Montana. He put his life on the line to save his comrade, Black Horse, during a horse stealing raid. He had a large family growing up, with six sisters and a brother. He had two children, Shell Woman and “Man Bear,” known as John Red Sleeve. The exact date of his death is uncertain, but he died in his home of electrical shock in the Muddy Cluster district on the Northern Cheyenne Reservation.

== Family ==
Red Sleeve had a big family. His eldest sister was Wolf Woman, Elk Woman was the second eldest, and Medicine Woman was the third oldest. Others in the bunch were Young Medicine Woman, Buffalo Woman, and Mrs. Ford Wounded Eye. His brother was William Yellowrobe. His children’s names were Shell Woman and “Man Bear,” also commonly known as John Red Sleeve.

== Political history ==
During the summer of 1864, Red Arm, along with ten other Cheyenne men, was named in the Chiefs’ renewed Council of Forty-Four. This renewed council then took their first action, choosing the new Sweet Medicine Chief. They all decided in choosing the young Little Wolf, which was surprising to the people. Little Wolf, was however, also sitting as head chief for the warrior society, the Elkhorn Scrapers. He was supposed to step down from that position to serve on the council, but the Elkhorns would not allow him to step down, instead he became the only man in Cheyenne history to serve as head chief in both the Council of Forty-four and a warrior society at the same time.

Red Sleeve was very active during Little Wolf’s trail back to the homeland. It was after Chief Morning Star and Little Wolf had divided and separated during their travels back to the homelands. Red Sleeve actively participated in one of the last horse stealing raids, which were led by Black Horse, a Cheyenne chief. Red Sleeve put his life on the line along with fellow warrior, Mad Hearted Wolf, to save Black Horse from being killed by white settlers. The white settlers that had shot Black Horse were killed soon after. They had managed to get away with two horses. Black Horse was wounded so badly, he had to be carried back to the Cheyenne’s main camp on a travois. He pleaded to be left where he lay to die, but the warriors did not listen.

They had noticed their camp was moving out to the lands north of Pine Ridge. They were heading for “Noaha-vose,” the sacred mountain, which is now known as Bear Butte, located outside Sturgis, South Dakota. The Cheyenne were going to have a prayer ceremony. They were praying to “Ma?heo?o,” (pronounced mah-hey-o) the creator. There, Little Wolf went up the mountain to have a fasting ceremony.

On July 16, 1866, Red Sleeve joined the Cheyenne chiefs in a council with Colonel Henry Carrington, in an effort to secure peace. Amongst those included were the chiefs, Dull Knife, Little Moon, Pretty Bear, Jumping Rabbit, Wolf That Lies Down, Man That Stands Alone, Black Horse, and Lame White Man. They managed to work out peace agreement contracts, which were signed by Carrington himself, and the Cheyenne continued on their way to meet with Red Cloud, a Lakota warrior. The peace agreement between the Cheyenne and Carrington sickened him and he disrespected the Cheyenne by counting coup on them. He was treating them as if they were enemies. Red Cloud wanted the white people gone from the lands and he would stop at nothing to get what he wanted.

Humiliated and fearing the area unsafe, the Cheyenne returned to their camp on the Rosebud. On their way home, they warned two wagon trains that Red Cloud was on a war path. However, one warning had come too late, Red Cloud had attacked them. Two were killed in this fight.
