= Alabaster Caverns State Park =

State park in Oklahoma, United States

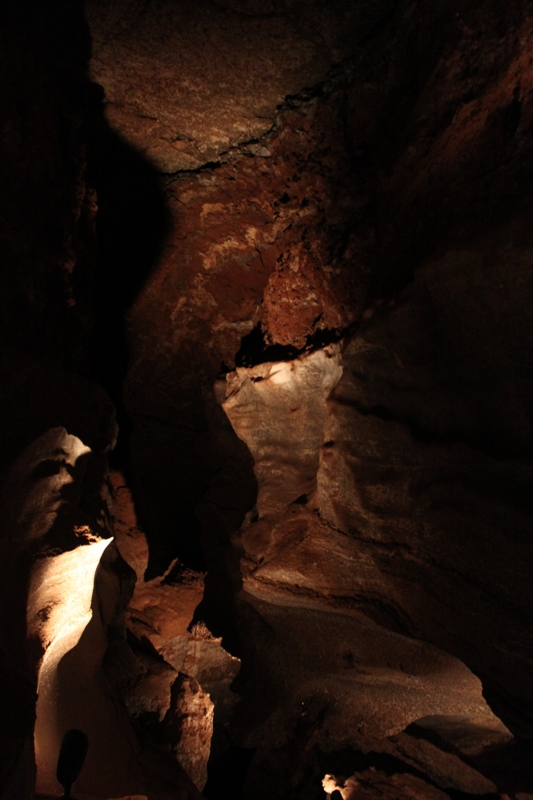
- Passage in Alabaster Caverns

- Location within Oklahoma
- Location: Woodward County, Oklahoma, United States
- Nearest city: Freedom, Oklahoma
- Coordinates: 36°41′54″N 99°08′47″W
- Area: 200 acres (81 ha)
- Established: 1956
- Visitors: 24,706 (in FY 2016)
- Governing body: Oklahoma Tourism and Recreation Department
- Website: www.travelok.com/listings/view.profile/id.110

Alabaster Caverns State Park is a 200-acre (0.81 km^{2}) state park approximately 4.5 miles (7.2 km) south of Freedom, Oklahoma, United States near Oklahoma State Highway 50. The park attracted 24,706 visitors in FY 2016, The lowest count of the three parks in its part of Oklahoma. (Note: The other two parks were Great Salt Plains State Park and Boiling Springs State Park.) According to the Encyclopedia of Oklahoma History and Culture, the park previously attracted about 40,000 visitors per year. It is home to the largest natural gypsum cave in the world that is open to the public. The gypsum is mostly in the form of alabaster. There are several types of alabaster found at the site, including pink, white, and the rare black alabaster. This black alabaster can be found in only three veins in the world, one each in Oklahoma, Italy and China. Another form of gypsum can be found in the many selenite crystal formations.

The state considered closing Alabaster Caverns for budgetary reasons in 2017, but the park remains open daily.

== History ==
Over 200 million years ago, during the Permian Age, this part of North America was covered by an inland sea. The water eventually evaporated, leaving behind huge deposits of alabaster and other minerals. Upheavals of the earth raised the gypsum bed close to the surface. Over time, water streams tunneled caverns through the formation, which contains an abundant quality of selenite crystals, white and pink gypsum as well as deposits of rare black alabaster. (Note: Black alabaster color is caused by the presence of manganese crystals.)

There is no official record of discovery for Alabaster Caverns, even though they were known to have been used as hideouts by outlaws in the 19th century. The first documented exploration of the caves occurred in 1898, shortly after Hugh Litton homesteaded the area in 1893. Several individuals leased land around them during the 1920s and 30s, and allowed limited tours of the caverns, which they called "bat caves." In 1939, an Englishman named Charles Grass bought the land. began renovating the caves, and opened them for public tours. It was Grass who gave them their current name. Grass was in failing health in 1952 when a group of five businessmen from Freedom, Oklahoma, the nearest community, and members of the Waynoka Railroad Labor League began lobbying for the U.S. state of Oklahoma to buy Grass' land. The state purchased 200 acres (81 ha) from Grass on September 1, 1953, for $34,000, then reclassified the purchase as a state park in 1956, under the jurisdiction of the Oklahoma Planning and Resources Board.

In the mid-1950s the caves served as a nuclear fallout shelter with a capacity of approximately 3000 people.

== Geology ==
Alabaster Caverns State Park is underlain by Permian age sedimentary rocks (~300 to 250 million years old). The main cavern extends 0.75 miles (1,210 m) into the formation, is about 60 feet (18 m) wide and 50 feet (15 m)high. The cavern branches into boulder formations and smaller caves. (Note: These formations are called, for example, "Ship's Prow," "Devil's Kitchen" or "Crystal Vault.") A small perennial stream now flows through the cavern, fed by various lateral tunnels and seepage from the roof. In the geologic past, the river was once capable of completely filling the cavern, as the cave walls and gypsum formations show evidence of sculpting by rapidly flowing water. The air temperature ranges from 52˚F to 58˚ year round in the cavern. In October 2018, high rainfall led to a cave in of 2200 tons of rock, which blocked the entrance of the cavern and viewing of the black gypsum vein. Tours are now return trips from the original exit. The estimated cost of restoring the blocked section is $6.5M (2023).

== Wildlife ==
The cavern is home to five different species of bat. Some are solitary while others are colonial. The cavern provides roosting sites that serve as daytime shelter and a place for the non-migrating bats to hibernate during the winter months. Mexican free-tailed bats migrate to Alabaster Caverns from Mexico in the spring to bear their young. They then return to Mexico in the fall. During the winter months large colonies of bats are visible throughout the cave, although they are rarely seen during summer months.

The bat species found in the cave are the cave myotis, Western big-eared bat, eastern pipistrelle, Western big brown bat, and the Mexican free-tailed bat.

Alabaster Caverns State Park personnel made a count of the bats in the caverns in January 2024 and reported over 12,000. In 2016, the count reported about 16,000. The cave system is surveyed yearly for white nose syndrome, and as of 2024 none has been detected.

== Visitor activities ==
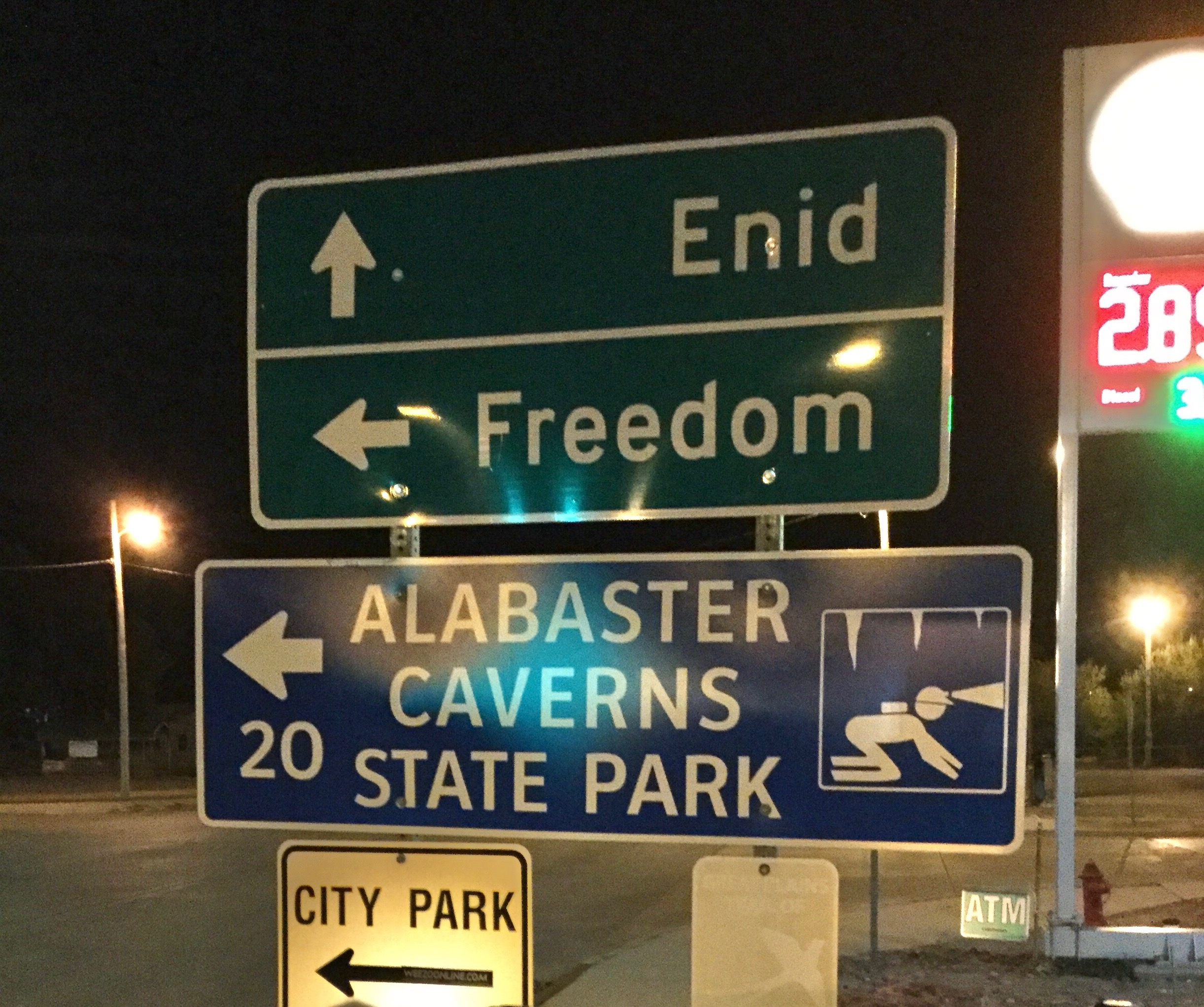
Sign pointing to Alabaster Caverns along highway 412

Beside guided cave tours, wild caving, camping, hiking trails, and recreational facilities such as horseshoe pits and volleyball courts are available to visitors.

Tours are conducted every hour on the hour and last about 45 minutes, and are limited to 40 persons each. The caves are lighted and have plenty of handrails. However, the walking tour is about 0.75 miles (1,210 m) long and visitors must climb up or down about 330 stairsteps. This tour is not recommended for people with mobility or respiratory problems, heart conditions or claustrophobia.

== Filming ==
The cave was used as a filming location for the 2019 movie "The Bygone." The 2023 film, "The Quest for Tom Sawyer's Gold" was also partially filmed in the caves.
