= Muddy, Montana =

Muddy, Montana Heóvonêheo'he'é-taneno
- Census-designated place
- Location of Muddy, Montana
- Coordinates: 45°35′57″N 106°45′20″W
- Country: United States
- State: Montana
- County: Big Horn

Area
  - Total: 28.63 sq mi (74.14 km^{2})
  - Land: 28.63 sq mi (74.14 km^{2})
  - Water: 0 sq mi (0.00 km^{2})
- Elevation: 3,586 ft (1,093 m)

Population (2020)
  - Total: 646
  - Density: 22.6/sq mi (8.71/km^{2})
- Time zone: UTC-7 (Mountain (MST))
  - Summer (DST): UTC-6 (MDT)
- Area code: 406
- FIPS code: 30-52315
- GNIS feature ID: 2408887

Muddy or Heóvonėheo'hé'e (Muddy Creek. Lit: yellow-paint-creek) is a census-designated place (CDP) in Big Horn County, Montana, United States and home to the Heóvonėheo'hé'etaneo'o or Heóvonêheo'he'é-taneno (″Muddy Creek people″) Cheyenne people. As of the 2020 census, Muddy had a population of 646.

== Geography ==
Muddy is located at 45°35′57″N 106°44′22″W (45.599225, -106.739578). U.S. Route 212 passes through the town. It is about 5 miles from Lame Deer.

According to the United States Census Bureau, the CDP has a total area of 28.6 square miles (74.2 km^{2}), all land.

== Demographics ==
Historical population
Census	Pop.	Note	%±
2020	646		—
U.S. Decennial Census

At the 2000 census, there were 627 people, 149 households and 129 families residing in the CDP. The population density was 22.0 per square mile (8.5/km^{2}). There were 160 housing units at an average density of 5.6/sq mi (2.2/km^{2}). The racial makeup of the CDP was 5.42% White, 94.26% Native American, and 0.32% from two or more races. Hispanic or Latino of any race were 3.03% of the population.

There were 149 households, of which 63.8% had children under the age of 18 living with them, 41.6% were married couples living together, 31.5% had a female householder with no husband present, and 13.4% were non-families. 8.7% of all households were made up of individuals, and none had someone living alone who was 65 years of age or older. The average household size was 4.21 and the average family size was 4.34.

46.4% of the population were under the age of 18, 10.5% from 18 to 24, 26.8% from 25 to 44, 14.8% from 45 to 64, and 1.4% who were 65 years of age or older. The median age was 20 years. For every 100 females, there were 100.3 males. For every 100 females age 18 and over, there were 85.6 males.

The median household income was $24,688 and the median family income for a family was $23,529. Males had a median income of $26,806 compared with $11,458 for females. The per capita income for the CDP was $4,837. About 45.4% of families and 59.9% of the population were below the poverty line, including 69.5% of those under age 18 and 100.0% of those age 65 or over.

== Notable person ==
- Red Armed Panther
