= Battle of Punished Woman's Fork =

1878 Indian Wars battle in Kansas

Coordinates: 38.644°N 100.928°W

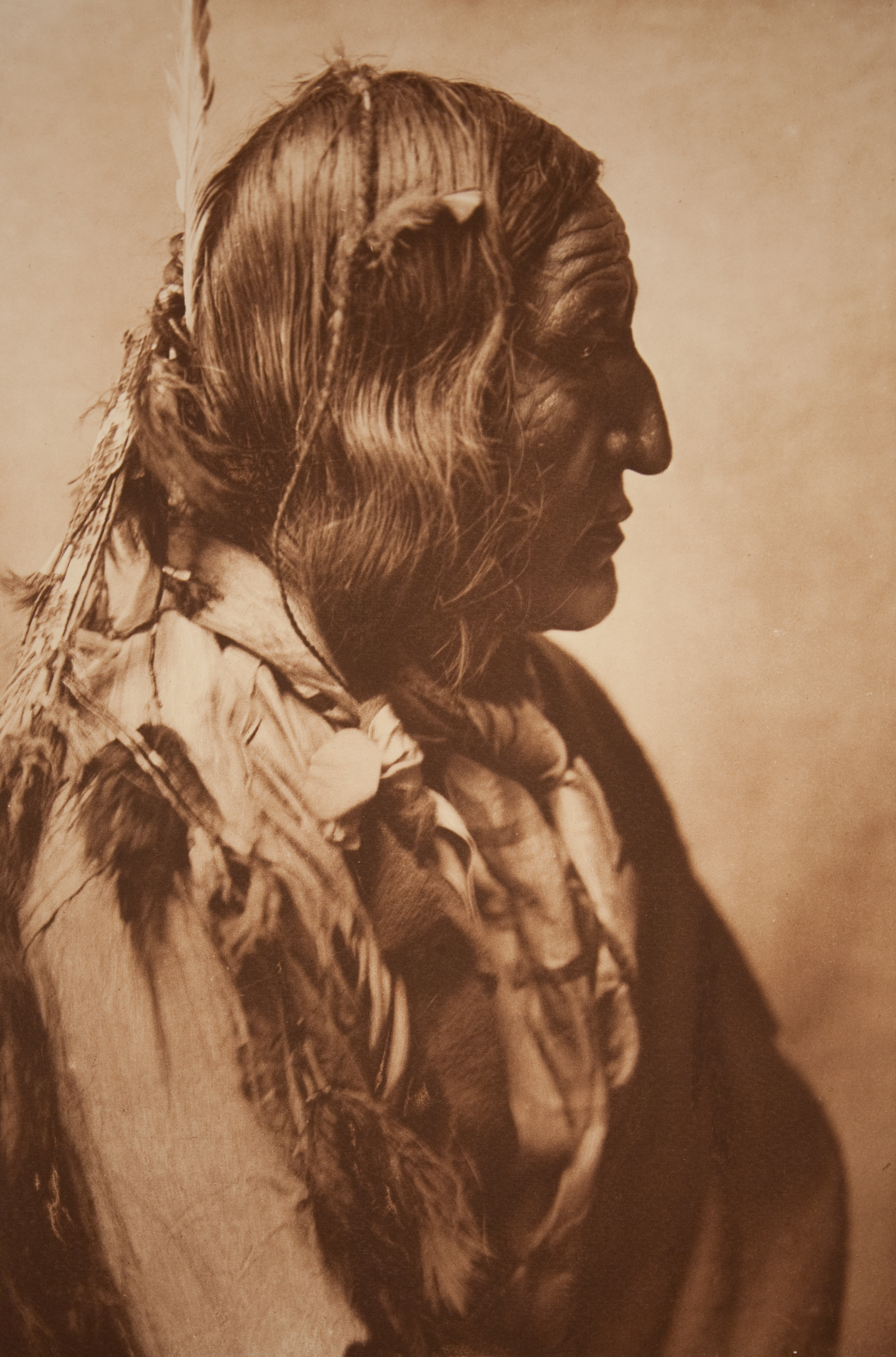
- Little Wolf
Date	27 September 1878
Location	Near Scott City, Kansas, United States
Result	Cheyenne escape

Belligerents
United States	Cheyenne

Commanders and leaders
Col. William H. Lewis	Little Wolf, Dull Knife

Strength
200 soldiers	92 warriors

Casualties and losses
1 killed, several wounded	Several wounded
- Location within Kansas

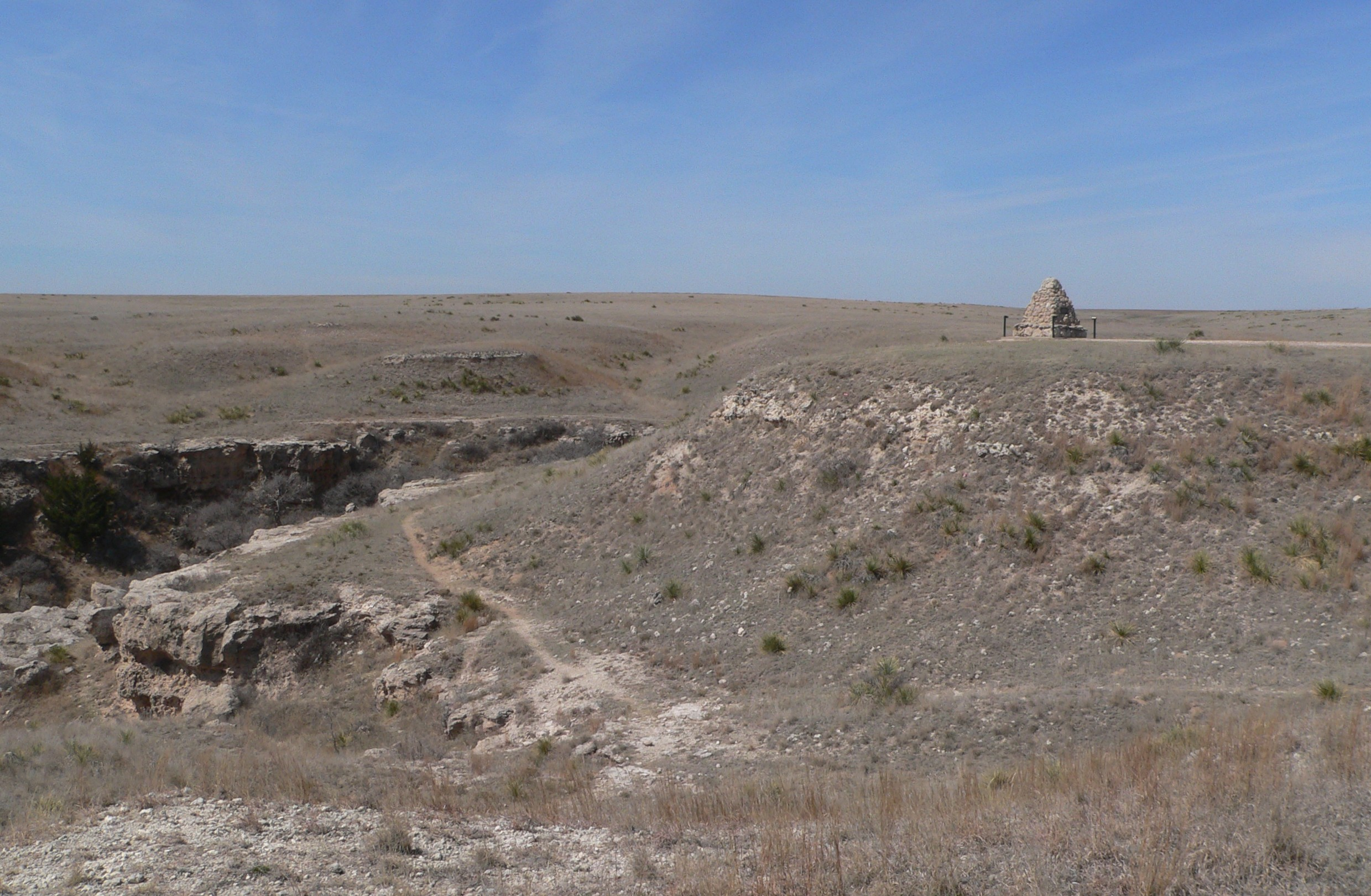
The battle site and monument. The Cheyenne dug rifle pits overlooking the canyon, but the soldiers advanced on higher ground.

The Battle of Punished Woman's Fork (27 September 1878), also called Battle Canyon, was the last battle between Native Americans (Indians) and the United States Army in the state of Kansas. In the Northern Cheyenne Exodus, 353 Cheyenne, including women and children, fled their reservation in Oklahoma in an attempt to return to their homeland on the northern Great Plains. In Kansas, they fought soldiers of the U.S. Army at Punished Woman's Fork (now called Ladder Creek), killing the army commander. After the battle the Cheyenne continued northward. Some were successful in reaching their relatives in Montana. Others were captured or killed near Camp Robinson, Nebraska.

== Background ==
In the 1830s the Cheyenne tribe split into two groups: the Northern Cheyenne and the Southern Cheyenne. The Dull Knife and Little Wolf bands of the Northern Cheyenne were defeated by the U.S. Cavalry in the Dull Knife Fight in November 1876. Chiefs Dull Knife (also known as Morning Star) and Little Wolf and their followers subsequently surrendered to the U.S. at Camp Robinson, Nebraska. From May to August 1877, the Northern Cheyenne were escorted by soldiers 1,300 km (810 miles) south to the Southern Cheyenne reservation in Oklahoma. Nine-hundred and thirty seven Cheyenne arrived at the reservation, headquartered about 50 kilometres (31 miles) west of present-day Oklahoma City near Fort Reno. Conditions were difficult with shortages of food and outbreaks of measles and malaria. Dull Knife and Little Wolf pleaded to be allowed to return to the northern plains but were turned down. In September 1878, the two leaders and 351 of their followers fled the reservation with the intent of journeying to rejoin other groups of Northern Cheyenne who resided mostly in Montana. Ninety-two of those fleeing the reservation were warriors; the remainder were women, children, and elderly.

After fleeing the reservation on the night of September 9/10, the Cheyenne traveled northward on horseback some 500 km (310 miles) fighting three successful skirmishes with the army and civilian volunteers, including the Battle of Turkey Springs. In northern Oklahoma and southern Kansas they stole horses and cattle for their subsistence and in the process killed nine ranchers.

== The battle ==
On 25 September Colonel William H. Lewis was given the command of about 200 soldiers, mostly cavalry, to pursue the Cheyenne in northern Kansas. On 27 September he found the trail of the Cheyenne in a hilly area north of present-day Scott City. The Cheyenne apparently planned to lure the soldiers into an ambush in a narrow ravine around which they had taken up defensive positions. Their women and children and horses were hidden in nearby ravines. The soldiers advanced carefully and were warned of the Cheyenne presence when a warrior opened fire prematurely. A rifle duel ensued. The soldiers continued their advance on higher ground rather than the ravine and found and scattered the Cheyenne's horse herd. Colonel Lewis led the advance and was wounded and died from loss of blood the next day. After Lewis was shot, the soldiers abandoned the battlefield, claiming they had killed one Cheyenne and wounded others. The loss of many of their horses and much of their food was a blow to the Cheyenne.

== Aftermath ==
Captain Clarence Mauck led the soldiers after Lewis's death. He trailed the Cheyenne for three days, but they slipped away from him and were next seen but not engaged by the army 200 km (120 miles) north while crossing the Republican River in southern Nebraska.

The Cheyenne needed horses and food after the battle. North of Punished Woman's Fork, they encountered for the first time a region populated largely by farmers. From September 29 to October 3, they replenished their supplies by raids, mostly in Decatur County and Rawlins County in the Sappa Creek valley. They killed more than 30 civilians and raped several women. The violence came despite the orders of their leaders to avoid killing civilians. The massacre of civilians has been portrayed as revenge for a defeat (or massacre) of Cheyenne near Sappa Creek by soldiers three years earlier called the Battle of Sappa Creek and also as Cheyenne rage that this region, formerly prime hunting grounds for bison, was now farmland. Seven Cheyenne warriors were later arrested and charged with killing non-combatants in Kansas. In the murder trial the seven were acquitted for lack of evidence.

The killing of non-combatants was not confined to the Cheyenne. Several Cheyenne women, children, and elderly who were lost or unable to keep up with the fast-moving caravan are known to have been executed by white soldiers and civilians.

In Nebraska, the Cheyenne split into two groups with Little Wolf taking the more able bodied with him and successfully joining the Northern Cheyenne in Montana. Dull Knife with a smaller group was captured and imprisoned at Camp Robinson. In January 1879 in the Fort Robinson breakout, the Cheyenne attempted to escape but nearly all were either killed or recaptured. The survivors of the Northern Cheyenne Exodus were allowed to remain in their homeland on the northern plains.

A monument at the site and overlooking the canyon commemorates the battle. In Oberlin, the Decatur County Last Indian Raid Museum commemorates the Cheyenne raid. In Rawlins County, there is a monument commemorating a Cheyenne boy that was injured during the raids, and then later killed by settlers six weeks later.
