= Freedom, Oklahoma =

- City
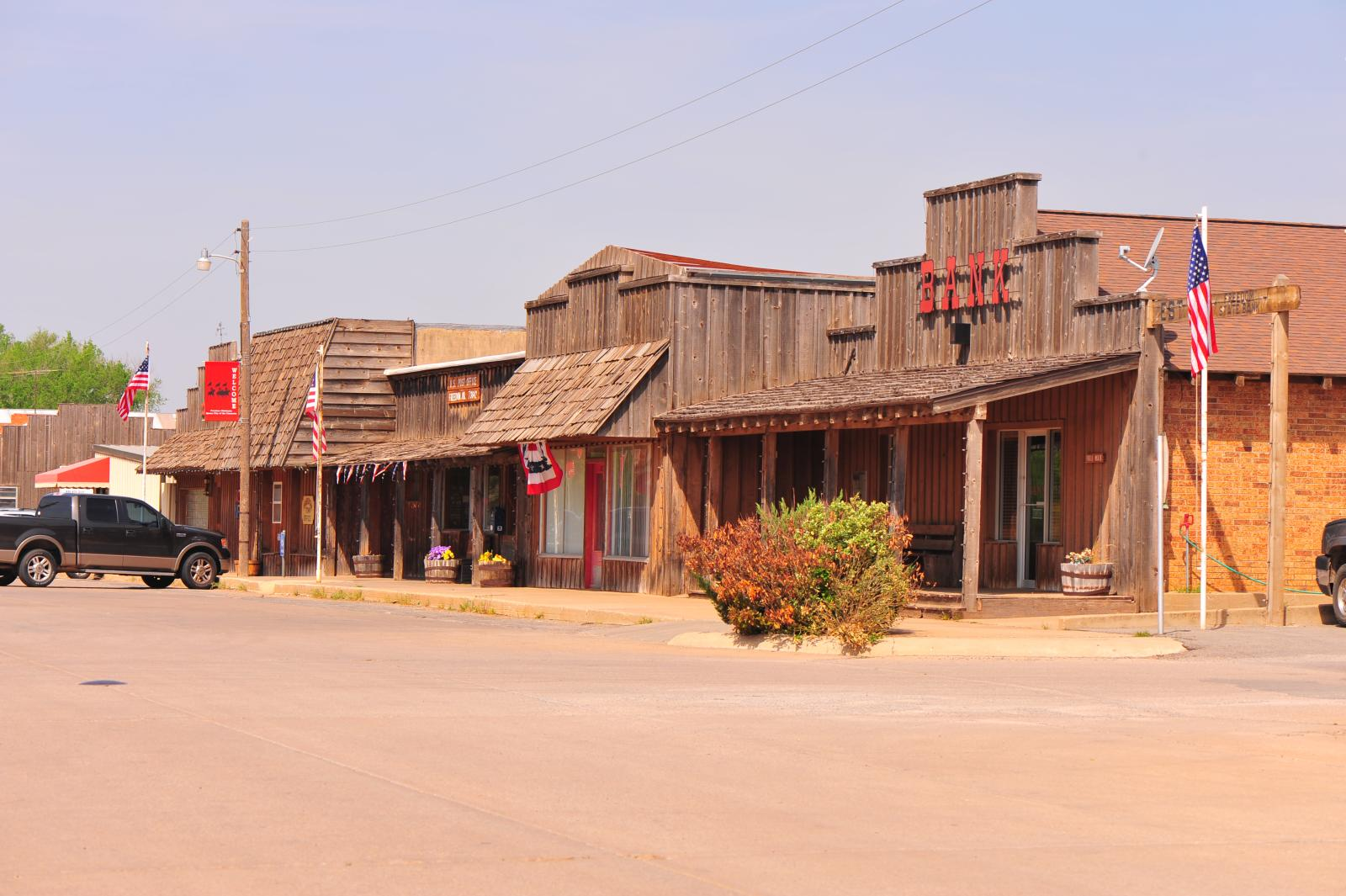
- Nickname: Queen City of the Cimarron
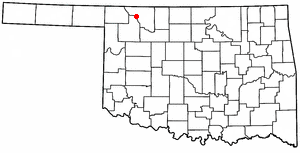
- Location of Freedom within Oklahoma
- Coordinates: 36°46′9″N 99°6′48″W
- Country: United States
- State: Oklahoma
- County: Woods
- Incorporated: 1925

Area
  - Total: 0.39 sq mi (1.01 km^{2})
  - Land: 0.39 sq mi (1.01 km^{2})
  - Water: 0 sq mi (0.00 km^{2})
- Elevation: 1,529 ft (466 m)

Population (2020)
  - Total: 174
  - Density: 445.4/sq mi (171.96/km^{2})
- Time zone: UTC-6 (CST)
  - Summer (DST): UTC-5 (CDT)
- ZIP code: 73842
- Area code: 580
- FIPS code: 40-27850
- GNIS feature ID: 1093038
- Website: freedomokla.com

Freedom is a town in Woods County, Oklahoma, United States. It lies twenty-five miles west of Alva, on the banks of the Cimarron River. The population was 174 at the time of the 2020 Census.

== History ==
On September 13 and 14, 1878, the Battle of Turkey Springs was fought approximately ten miles northeast of present-day Freedom. It was the last known encounter between the United States Cavalry and American Indians in Oklahoma.

In the late 1800s, following the Cherokee Strip Land Run, farmers and ranchers began a small settlement in the area. This 1893 land run, combined with the building of the Buffalo and Northwestern Railroad in 1919–20, incentivized many settlers to homestead 160-acre tracts in the area. The community of Freedom—so-named by the postal service—was granted a post office in 1901, with Mrs. Adlah Annis serving as its first postmaster. However, it wouldn't be until 1925 that Freedom was officially incorporated, with a population of 251.

The community of Freedom is known as the smallest certified city (as opposed to a town) in the state of Oklahoma.

== Geography ==
Freedom is located at 36°46′09″N 99°06′48″W. According to the United States Census Bureau, the town has a total area of 0.3 square miles (0.78 km^{2}), all land.

=== Climate ===
Climate data for Freedom, Oklahoma
Month	Jan	Feb	Mar	Apr	May	Jun	Jul	Aug	Sep	Oct	Nov	Dec	Year
Mean daily maximum °F (°C)	48.1 (8.9)	53.9 (12.2)	63.5 (17.5)	74.5 (23.6)	82.3 (27.9)	91.0 (32.8)	96.8 (36.0)	94.9 (34.9)	86.3 (30.2)	76.1 (24.5)	60.9 (16.1)	49.9 (9.9)	73.2 (22.9)
Mean daily minimum °F (°C)	19.7 (−6.8)	24.7 (−4.1)	33.9 (1.1)	45.1 (7.3)	55.1 (12.8)	64.1 (17.8)	69.1 (20.6)	67.2 (19.6)	59.0 (15.0)	45.7 (7.6)	33.1 (0.6)	22.7 (−5.2)	44.9 (7.2)
Average precipitation inches (mm)	0.5 (13)	0.9 (23)	1.9 (48)	2.2 (56)	3.5 (89)	3.1 (79)	2.4 (61)	3.0 (76)	2.6 (66)	1.9 (48)	1.4 (36)	0.8 (20)	24.2 (615)
Source 1: weather.com
Source 2: Weatherbase.com

== Demographics ==
Historical population
Census	Pop.	Note	%±
1930	350		—
1940	364		4.0%
1950	332		−8.8%
1960	268		−19.3%
1970	292		9.0%
1980	339		16.1%
1990	264		−22.1%
2000	271		2.7%
2010	289		6.6%
2020	174		−39.8%
U.S. Decennial Census

As of the census of 2000, there were 271 people, 108 households, and 77 families residing in the town. The population density was 776.7 inhabitants per square mile (299.9/km^{2}). There were 129 housing units at an average density of 369.7 per square mile (142.7/km^{2}). The racial makeup of the town was 95.94% White, 0.74% Asian, 2.21% from other races, and 1.11% from two or more races. Hispanic or Latino of any race were 2.58% of the population.

There were 108 households, out of which 35.2% had children under the age of 18 living with them, 58.3% were married couples living together, 10.2% had a female householder with no husband present, and 27.8% were non-families. 25.0% of all households were made up of individuals, and 12.0% had someone living alone who was 65 years of age or older. The average household size was 2.51 and the average family size was 2.97.

In the town, the population was spread out, with 29.2% under the age of 18, 6.6% from 18 to 24, 26.2% from 25 to 44, 21.4% from 45 to 64, and 16.6% who were 65 years of age or older. The median age was 38 years. For every 100 females, there were 81.9 males. For every 100 females age 18 and over, there were 86.4 males.

The median income for a household in the town was $36,250, and the median income for a family was $38,500. Males had a median income of $31,458 versus $22,500 for females. The per capita income for the town was $20,255. About 5.4% of families and 9.3% of the population were below the poverty line, including 6.8% of those under the age of eighteen and 11.1% of those 65 or over.

== Economy ==
Cargill Salt has a solar salt processing plant 8.0 miles (12.9 km) west of Freedom. The salt is sold for livestock and industrial use. Ezra Blackmon opened a salt factory and began mechanized production, in 1935, as Blackmon Salt Company. In 1982, Cargill purchased the salt plant, expanded the evaporative ponds, and began its production in 1988.

Freedom State Bank was a long-time presence in Freedom from its founding by David H. Powers, in 1919. When Powers died in 1934, his son, James G. (Jim) Powers, became president and kept the bank open through the Great Depression. In 1954, Nixon, James Powers' brother-in-law and long-time bank employee, became president and chief executive officer. As majority stockholder, Jim Powers continued to serve as chairman of the bank’s board of directors until his death in 1988. The bank was closed by the Federal Deposit Insurance Corporation on June 27, 2014 after regulators found that Freedom State Bank was “critically under capitalized” and had determined that its capital position was “rapidly deteriorating.” Freedom State Bank reopened as a branch of Alva State Bank & Trust following the closure.,

== Area attractions ==
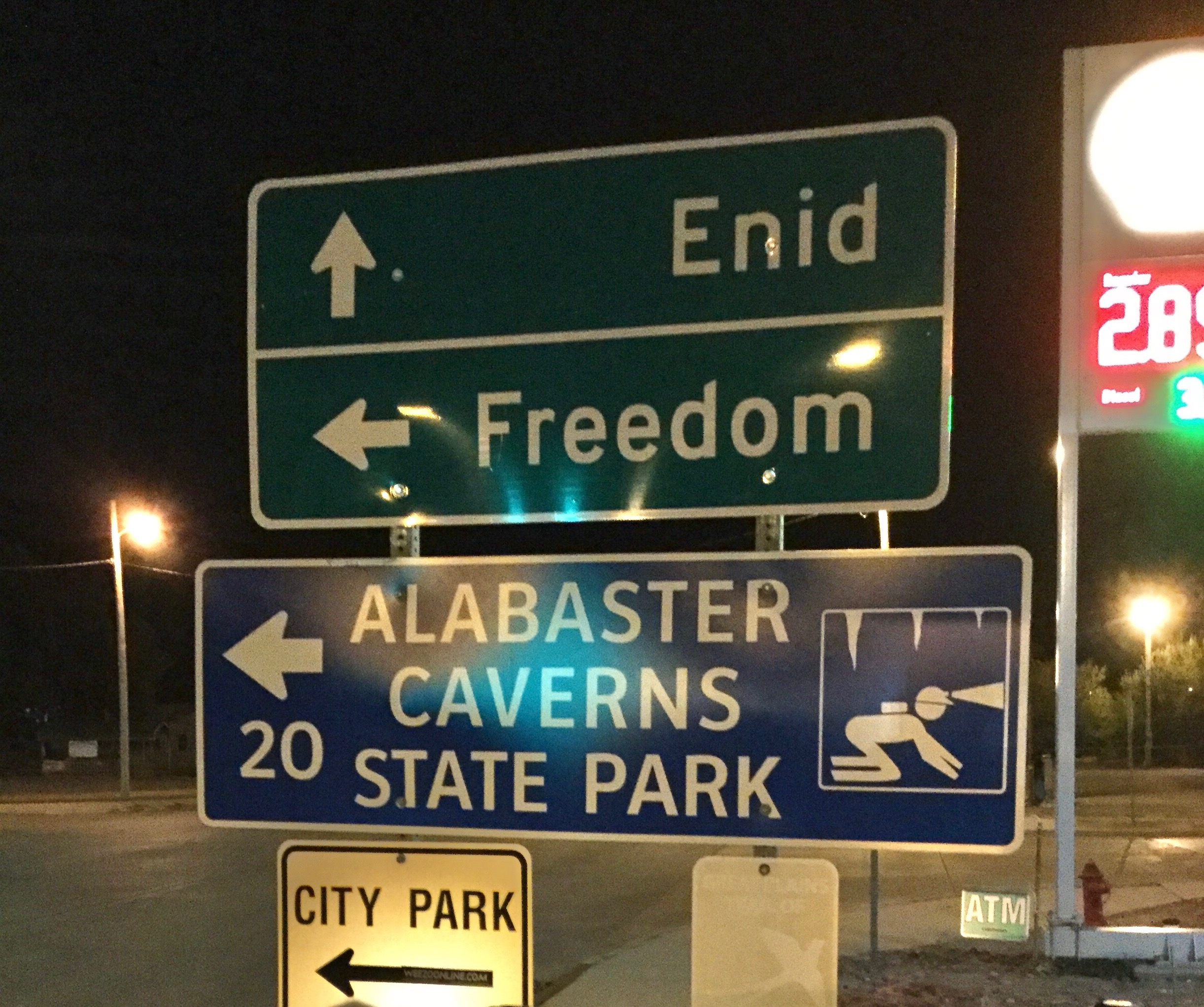
Sign pointing to Enid, Freedom, and Alabaster Caverns along highway 412

Alabaster Caverns State Park is located 6 miles (9.7 km) south of Freedom.

Freedom is host to the annual Freedom Open Rodeo and Old Cowhand Reunion, known as the "Biggest Open Rodeo in The West". The rodeo was founded in 1938, with its accompanying Chuckwagon Feed starting a year later.

== Notable people ==
- Lewis Kamas (1921–1996), member of the Oklahoma House of Representatives, and military lieutenant
