= Porcupine (Cheyenne) =

Cheyenne chief and medicine man, c. 1848–1929

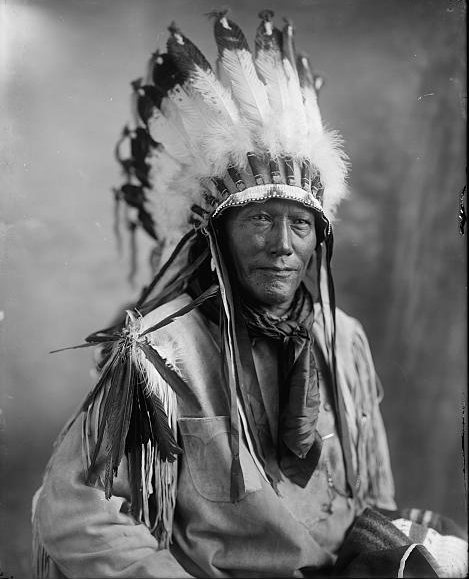
Porcupine in later life

Porcupine (Cheyenne: Heškovėstse; c. 1848–1929) was a Cheyenne chief and medicine man. He is best known for bringing the Ghost Dance religion to the Cheyenne. Raised with the Sioux of a Cheyenne mother, he married a Cheyenne himself and became a warrior in the Cheyenne Dog Soldiers.

Porcupine fought against the U.S. in Hancock's War in 1867 in which the Cheyenne resisted moving to a reservation. Porcupine's group was pursued by the 7th Cavalry from Kansas to Nebraska. In Nebraska he succeeded in derailing and wrecking a train, the first time this had been done by Indians. At the conclusion of the Great Sioux War of 1876, the Cheyenne surrendered and were deported to Oklahoma. Porcupine took part in the Northern Cheyenne Exodus in which a part of the starving tribe fought their way back to their homeland in Montana. Porcupine was one of a group of Cheyennes who were subsequently arrested on charges of murdering settlers as the Cheyennes crossed Kansas. After spending most of 1879 in prison, the charges were dismissed without a full trial taking place.

In 1889, Porcupine undertook a long journey to Nevada to visit Wovoka, the prophet of the new Ghost Dance religion. Porcupine believed that Wovoka was the Messiah who would save the Indians and rid the continent of the white men. Porcupine returned to preach the new religion to the Cheyennes and began baptising converts into his church. The Ghost Dance spread throughout the plains tribes. The U.S. Army suppressed the Ghost Dance because of settler concerns that it would lead to a new Indian uprising. While the Cheyenne did not suffer tragedy on the scale of the Sioux at Wounded Knee, Porcupine could only perform the dance in secret from 1890 onwards. In 1900 he was imprisoned for attempting to revive the religion.

Porcupine, like Wovoka, preached peace and took no part in the violence associated with the Ghost Dance elsewhere. He was a chief representing the Cheyenne in several treaty councils with the U.S., including leading a delegation to Washington.

== Early life ==
Porcupine was born c. 1848 and was raised with the Sioux. His father was Sioux and his mother was Cheyenne. He married a Cheyenne and became a member of the Cheyenne tribe, since it was the normal custom for a husband to live amongst the band of his wife's family, usually in a lodge adjacent to her parents. Like virtually all Cheyenne young men, Porcupine joined a warrior society, in his case, the Dog Soldiers.

== Hancock's War ==
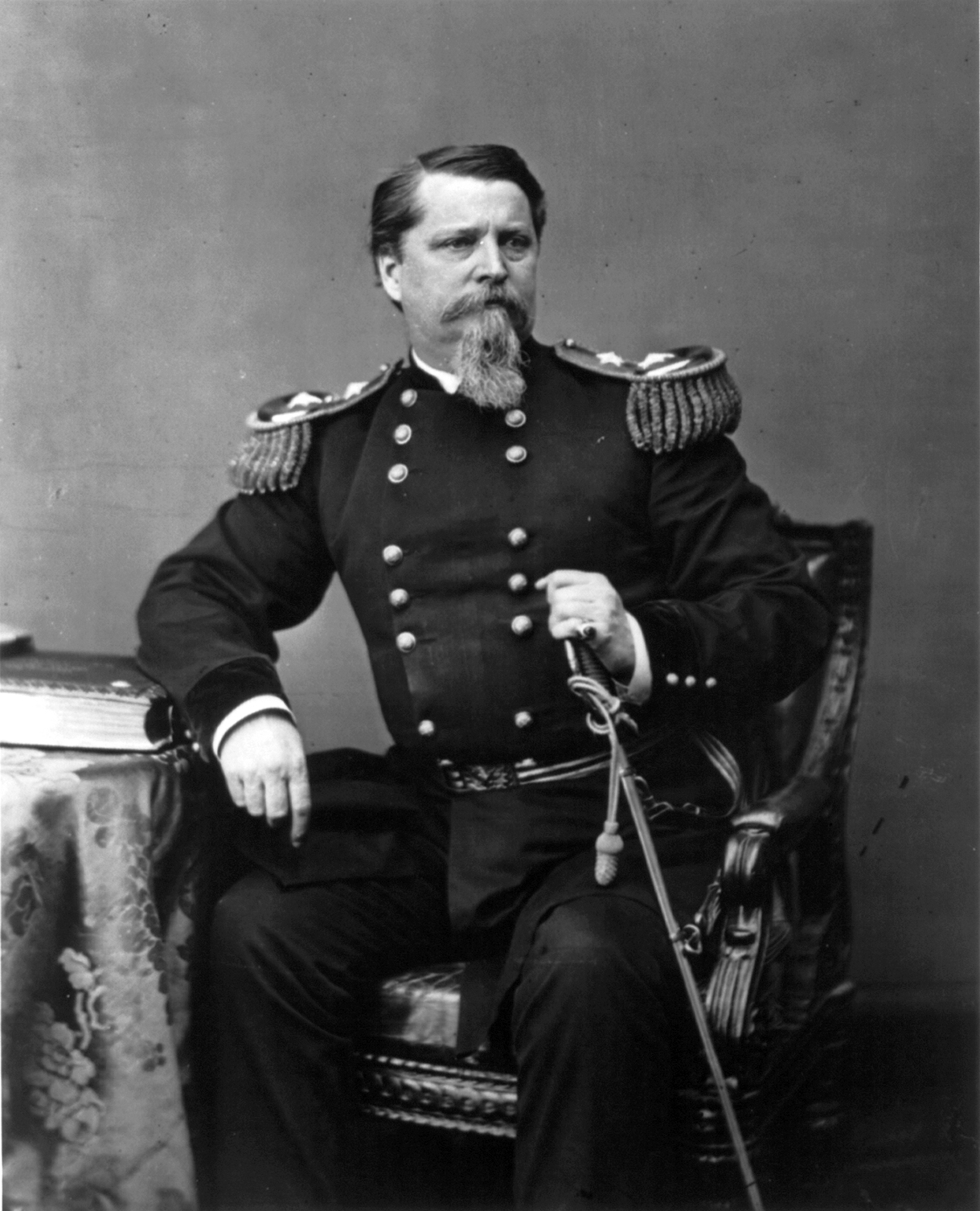
General Winfield Scott Hancock

At the end of the Civil War, the U.S. attempted to persuade the Plains Indians to live on reservations. A number of simultaneous military expeditions were launched in pursuit of this policy under the overall control of General Grant. General Winfield Scott Hancock commanded one such enterprise in West Kansas. Its chief, but not only, target was the Southern Cheyenne in the Smoky Hills region. In April 1867, Hancock moved a large force to Fort Larned and demanded that Indian leaders meet him there. The idea was to intimidate the Indians with a show of force. He was warned by Edward W. Wynkoop, the Indian agent for the Southern Cheyenne and Arapaho, that this would be seen by the Indians as an aggressive act and was inappropriate for peace negotiations. Hancock ignored this advice.

The Indians were wary of approaching the fort. A joint camp of Southern Cheyenne and Oglala Sioux was established thirty miles away at Pawnee Fork. A handful of Indians entered the fort, including Tall Bull, leader of the Cheyenne Dog Soldiers. Hancock threatened them with war if they did not agree to his terms, but they responded by returning to their camp. Angered that many Indian leaders had not met him, Hancock declared that if the Indians would not come to him, he would go to them and prepared to move his whole force to Pawnee Fork. The Indian agents again warned him that this would be seen as aggression. The Indians attempted to stop Hancock approaching the camp by setting fire to the prairie but this failed. Outside the camp there was a confrontation with the Cheyenne leader Roman Nose. Hancock spoke harshly to Roman Nose who then told his companion, Bull Bear, to ride away because he intended to kill Hancock in front of his soldiers and did not want Bull Bear to be killed in the inevitable hail of bullets that would follow. Instead Bull Bear led Roman Nose away. Hancock then ordered the camp to be captured, but on entering, it was found to be deserted. The Indians, fearing a repeat of the Sand Creek massacre, had already left and scattered. Hancock waited three days and then ordered the camp burned, despite warnings from the Indian agents that this would make war certain.

Hancock ordered George Armstrong Custer to take the 7th Cavalry in pursuit. This was Custer's first action in the Indian wars. It was not very successful, the scattered Indians were hard to follow and when Custer stopped at Fort Hays for forage for his horses he found there was none to be had and he became stuck there. On 19 April Hancock ordered the camp at Pawnee Fork to be destroyed in retaliation and sparked an Indian war, unnecessarily so according to many commentators both contemporary and modern. One of the Indians being pursued by Custer from Pawnee Fork was the nineteen-year-old Porcupine.

=== Train attack ===
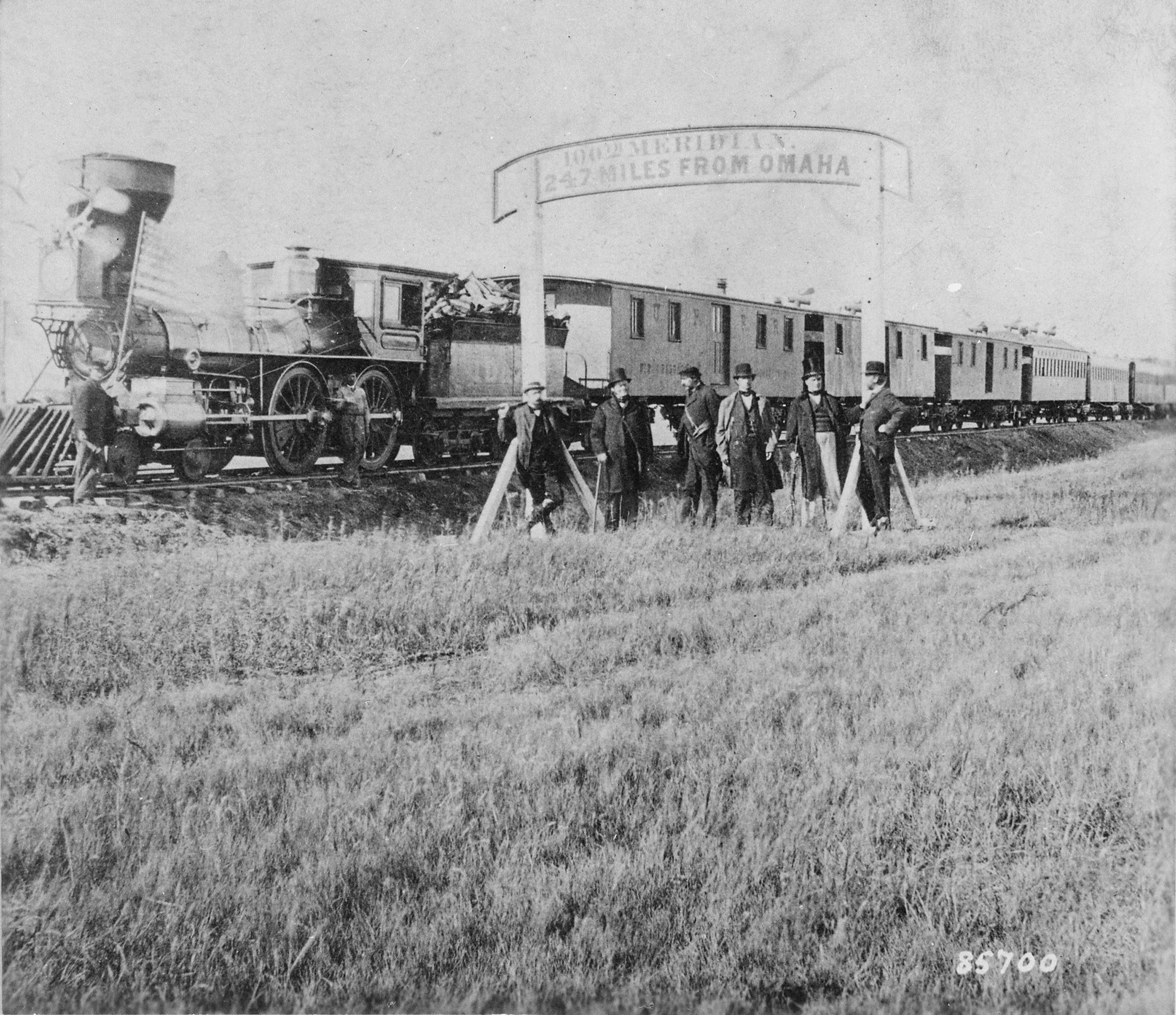
Union Pacific train, 1866, near the location of Porcupine's attack

Porcupine fled northward from Custer with a companion, Red Wolf. By the time they reached the Union Pacific Railroad near North Platte, Nebraska, they had joined a band of Cheyenne led by Turkey Leg and Spotted Wolf. Porcupine had the idea of attempting to stop or damage a train. On 6 August 1867 Porcupine and Red Wolf placed a railroad tie across the track at a point three miles west of Plum Creek (now Lexington) and tied it down with wire removed from the lineside telegraph line. They lit a fire at sunset. Two men, Pat Handerhan and William Thompson, were sent out on a handcar to investigate the failed telegraph line; Distracted by the fire, they let the handcar hit the obstruction. Porcupine and Red Wolf drove off the men with rifle fire after which they were pursued and Handerhan was killed. (Note: Marquis, citing Grinnell, says both Handerhan and Thompson were killed. The sources for both Marquis and Grinnell were Cheyennes, who thought that Thompson was dead (Marquis, p. 125).) Thompson was wounded but played dead, even as he was being scalped, and survived. Porcupine and Red Wolf found two Spencer carbines in the handcar. These were breech-loading weapons which they did not understand, being familiar only with muzzle-loading rifles. On discovering that the rifles would swivel apart they discarded them as broken.

Encouraged by this success, the Indians then tried to do some more substantial damage to the track. The rails were unfastened, lifted, bent aside and a more substantial barricade built. Late into the night, early 7 August, two freight trains approached. Some of the Indians came out of hiding and pursued the first train on horseback. They fired at it and even attempted to stop it by lassoing the engine. This did not work, but it did have the effect of causing the train engineer, Brooks Bower, to apply full throttle to escape the Indians. The train hit the damaged track at full speed. Bower was thrown through the cab window and died. The fireman, George Hendershot, was poised at the open door of the firebox with shovel in hand ready to throw in more coal. He was thrown inside the firebox and burnt to death. The survivors of the train wreck retreated back to the second train, along with Thompson, who came out of hiding carrying his own scalp. The train backed up to Plum Creek Station, picked up the residents there, and evacuated them to Elm Creek. There was a failed attempt to reattach Thompson's scalp in Omaha and it is now in the public library there.

In the morning the train was thoroughly looted and then burned. Bolts of calico from the train were tied to the tails of the warrior's ponies so that they unrolled into colourful flags. These were taken back to their camp for the women there. Porcupine's actions that day had resulted in the first train derailment by Indians.

== Escape from Oklahoma ==
Following the Indian surrender at the end of the Great Sioux War of 1876, the Cheyennes were forcibly deported to reservations in Oklahoma. There they found that the hunting grounds they had been allocated were devoid of the large game they needed to survive, and the supplies promised by the U.S. government failed to arrive, or were stolen by the Indian agents. Facing starvation, chiefs Dull Knife and Little Wolf in 1878 led the Northern Cheyenne on a fighting journey back to their homeland in Montana, more than a thousand miles away, pursued by the U.S. cavalry all the way. Porcupine took part in this Northern Cheyenne Exodus. Dull Knife surrendered at Fort Robinson in Nebraska. His band was imprisoned there and denied food and heating (with temperature well below freezing) for not agreeing to return to Oklahoma. Nearly half were killed (but not Dull Knife himself) in a desperate escape from Fort Robinson. Little Wolf surrendered in March 1879 at Fort Keogh in Montana. Little Wolf's band was permitted to stay and Dull Knife then joined them there.

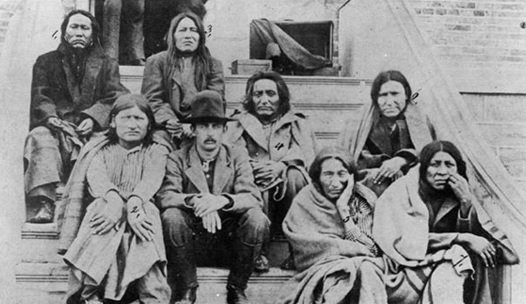
Porcupine (second from right) as a prisoner in Kansas 1879

A number of Kansas settlers had been killed during the Indians' journey north. There were calls to put the whole band of Cheyenne on trial as a group, but this had dubious legal standing. As a compromise, the military sent seven Indians, Wild Hog, a war chief of the Northern Cheyenne Elk warrior society, Porcupine, and five others (Old Crow, Tangled Hair, Blacksmith, Noisy Walker, and Strong Left Hand) for trial in a civilian court for these killings. A number of items taken from homes in Kansas had been found in the Indians' possession. They were sent to Fort Leavenworth, Kansas at the beginning of 1879 to await trial. From there they were escorted to Dodge City by lawman Bat Masterson where they were to be tried. This was not an easy journey; large, sometimes unruly, crowds turned out to view the Indians. In Lawrence, Masterson found it necessary to hit the city marshal to keep order. The trial began in Dodge City on 24 June. The defence lawyer successfully argued that local prejudice would prevent a fair trial in Dodge City and requested the trial be moved to Lawrence, a request that was granted. (Note: As well as Dodge City being closer to the scenes of the crimes, there was a distinct difference between the western frontier attitudes in West Kansas and the liberal attitudes in the east of the state, which was seen by West Kansans to aid the defence side (Powers & Leiker, pp. 92–93).) The defence built a case intended to expose the iniquities of the reservation system. They intended to embarrass Washington, and had issued subpoenas for, amongst others, General Nelson Miles, General John Pope, and Secretary of the Interior Carl Schurz. Meanwhile, the prosecution was having problems persuading witnesses to make the long journey to Lawrence. When the chief prosecutor failed to turn up on 13 October, all charges were dismissed.

== Ghost Dance apostle ==
The Ghost Dance religion was founded by its prophet Wovoka in Nevada, a Paiute Indian who had a vision on 1 January 1889 during a solar eclipse. In this vision, he was taken up to heaven and given a dance (the Ghost Dance) to pass on to the Indians to ensure their place in heaven. Wovoka's religion was heavily influenced by Christianity. He predicted that a Messiah figure, (Note: Wovoka was often accused in newspapers of claiming to be Christ. When interviewed by Mooney, he made no such claim, only claiming to be the prophet of the Messiah with the power, given him directly by God while he was in heaven, of being able to control the weather (Mooney, p. 773). However, many of his followers, including Porcupine, believed that he was the Messiah, Christ returned to Earth (Mooney, pp. 784–785, 795–796).) identified with Jesus, would come to Earth and resurrect all the Indian dead. All the whites would be removed from Earth and the buffalo would return. (Note: By the 1880s, buffalo hunting had driven the species to near extinction. As they were the main food source for the Indians as hunter-gatherers, they were no longer able to sustain this lifestyle on the plains and were forced to remain on the reservations (Isenberg, pp. 2–3).) Wovoka predicted that this would happen in Spring 1891. (Note: Wovoka originally predicted the resurrection to occur in the Autumn of 1890 (Mooney, p. 796; Marquis, p. 130). The prediction was adjusted when that date passed. See Marquis (Marquis, pp. 130–131) for even later resurgences of this religion. See Hittman (Hittman, pp. 259–267) for a list of newspaper accounts of continuing Ghost Dance activity running into the mid-1920s.) In the meantime, according to Wovoka's preaching, the Indians were not to fight the whites, but were to perform the Ghost Dance.

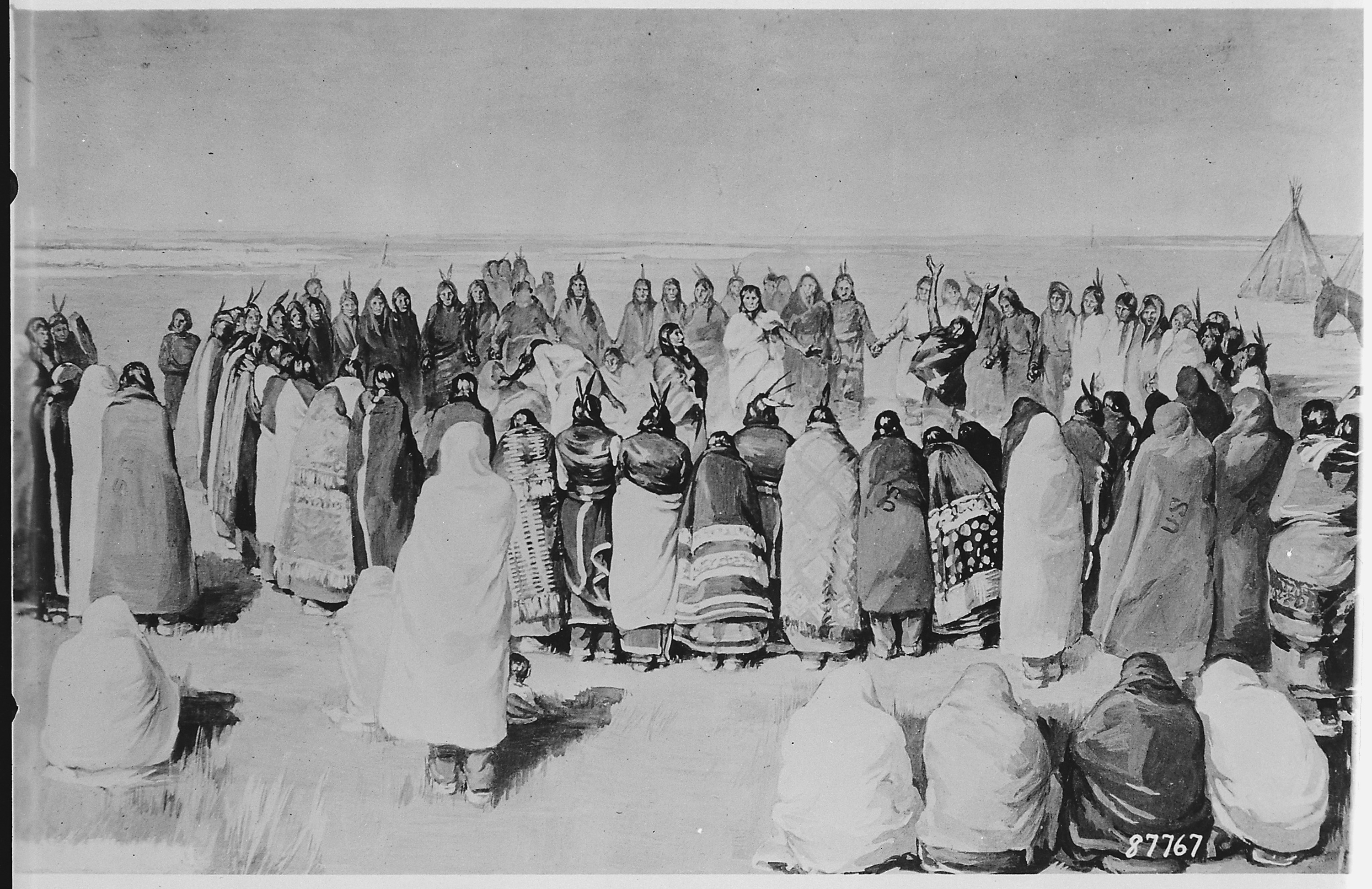
Arapahoes performing the Ghost Dance, 1900, based on photographs by James Mooney

In November 1889 Porcupine led a Cheyenne mission to visit the Arapahoes in Wyoming. His companions were Grasshopper, and a younger third Indian. In Wyoming, Porcupine repurposed the enterprise and went on to Nevada to see Wovoka. They stayed over the winter and returned in the spring of 1890. Porcupine's report to the tribal council of chiefs took five days to deliver. At the end of that time he was given permission to promulgate Wovoka's teaching amongst the tribe. Thus, Porcupine became the main apostle of the Ghost Dance amongst the Cheyennes. Porcupine preached that Wovoka was the Messiah and a Christ figure.

Porcupine describes the visit to Wovoka as a fortuitous side benefit of the visit to the Arapahoes. He mentions only the Cheyenne delegation as if they came alone. However, James Mooney, an ethnologist tasked by the U.S. government with investigating the Ghost Dance and who travelled far and wide to interview all the principals in the tribes concerned, including Wovoka himself, tells a different story. Porcupine's delegation was part of a larger, organised mission, perhaps a dozen people, sent out by a conference of chiefs at Fort Washakie in Wyoming with the explicit purpose of obtaining information about the new religion. The mission included delegates from the Sioux, Cheyenne, Arapahoe, and Shoshoni. It seems likely that the Arapahoe visit was a cover story to make it easier obtaining permission from the Indian agent to leave the reservation. U.S. soldiers guarding the reservation were under orders to stop anyone from leaving without a permit. Porcupine, however, travelled without a permit until he reached Fort Hall Indian Reservation in Idaho where he was given one by the Indian agent there. At Fort Hall, more Shoshoni and Bannock Indians joined them. The Indian agent at Pyramid Lake Indian Reservation in Nevada reported that the strength of the party was thirty-four as they passed through. Porcupine says that all the Indians they met after Fort Hall were already performing the Ghost Dance, and that many whites (these would be mostly Mormons in Nevada) (Note: See Hittman for a discussion on the possible connection between the ghost shirts of the Sioux and Mormon holy garments, a theory first proposed by Mooney (Hittman, pp. 84–88).) were also dancing.

=== White reaction ===
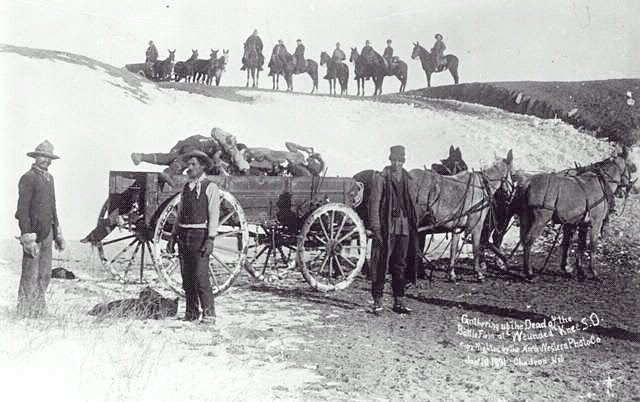
Burying the dead after the Wounded Knee Massacre

The Ghost Dance religion was not limited to the Cheyennes. It spread throughout the plains tribes. Settlers living close to reservations became concerned that it would lead to a new Indian uprising and called on the army to intervene. Indian dances had been made illegal by the Indian Religious Crimes Code, 1883, and remained so until 1934. White fear of the movement resulted in confrontation between the army and the Sioux and led to the killing of the Hunkpapa Sioux chief Sitting Bull and the Wounded Knee Massacre in December 1890. (Note: The Ghost Dance religion had lost some of its peaceful nature amongst the Sioux. The ghost shirts of the Sioux warriors were supposed to repel bullets. Wovoka disclaimed any connection to the ghost shirts (Mooney, p. 772).) At Porcupine's location on the Northern Cheyenne reservation, reinforcements were sent from Fort Keogh to the Lame Deer agency. The army sent Sgt. Willis Rowland, a mixed-blood Cheyenne-white scout, to gather intelligence on Porcupine's preaching. Rowland joined Porcupine's church and was baptised into it. Rowland disliked the deceitfulness of his mission; "I hated to do this, but it seemed like it was the best way." After three days, he reported back to his superiors that Porcupine's preaching was entirely peaceful and that nobody was talking about fighting whites. Nevertheless, the Ghost Dance was stopped by the government. The Northern Cheyenne sometimes succeeded in holding an illegal Ghost Dance by convincing soldiers trying to break it up that it was some different dance.

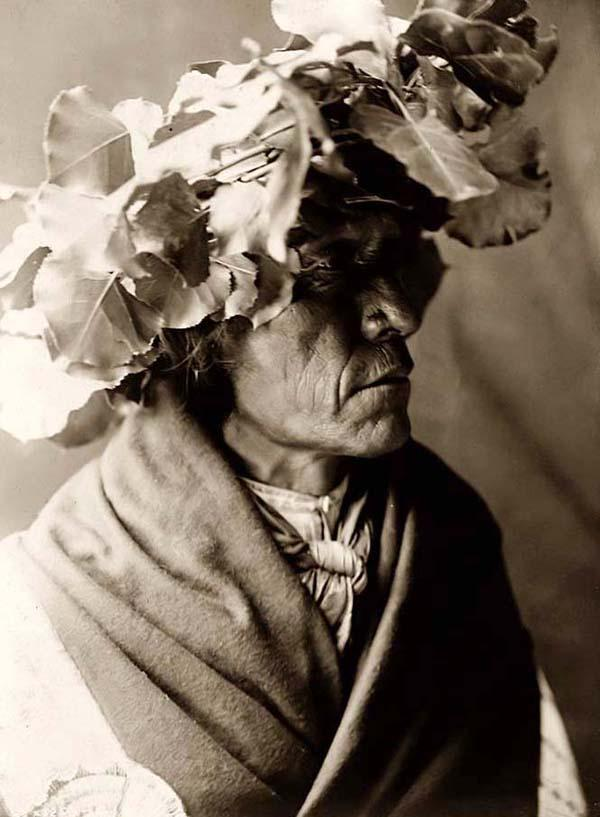
Porcupine in 1910

Some time after the Ghost Dance was stopped, Porcupine moved to the Oglala Sioux Pine Ridge Indian Reservation. The Sioux and Cheyennes had always been on friendly terms and had been allies in battle before the Cheyenne surrender. Porcupine himself was half Sioux. However, after Wounded Knee Porcupine and sixty others were temporarily moved to the Northern Cheyenne Reservation; many Cheyenne were in the army as scouts and it was felt they would not be safe at Pine Ridge. They became caught in a bureaucratic trap there. Porcupine believed that they should have been paid their share of the money from the enforced sale of reservation land in South Dakota to the government in 1889. (Note: The sale of the Sioux reservation land was instigated by President Harrison, keen to create two new Republican voting states, he needed the Indian land to make the newly created South Dakota state viable with enough room for settlement. The Indians had previously successfully opposed such a sale, but then Harrison sent a commission headed by General George Crook to ensure it happened. According to treaty, 75% of adult male Indians had to agree to a treaty change, which was needed for the land sale. Crook used a raft of dubious methods to gain the necessary signatures. He threatened that the land would be taken anyway and that they would then get nothing, he made promises that he was in no position to keep, and he kept hostile chiefs away from the talks. He even allowed non-Indians to sign the petition to artificially boost the numbers (Richardson, pp. 102–105).) They did not get it because they were no longer on the roll at Pine Ridge, even though their move was only supposed to be temporary ("a visit" as Cheyenne tribal historian John Stands in Timber puts it). Some of them were paid after a wait of a year.

The Ghost Dance religion faded when the Messiah and the resurrection of the dead failed to appear as predicted. It did not, however, die completely and a rump remains into the present day. Porcupine tried to revive the religion in 1900. Indian agent James C. Clifford gathered a petition from Northern Cheyennes demanding that he be imprisoned. Porcupine was arrested in October and given hard labour at Fort Keogh. He was released on 28 February 1901 on promising to behave. In 1918 there was a Messianic inspired attempt to organise a revolt on the Northern Cheyenne reservation. Whites at the agency were afraid enough to carry guns at all times and stockpile ammunition. However, the attempt was nipped in the bud with strongly worded threats to the Indians. Porcupine took no part in this, or any other, Messiah-connected attempted rebellions. He remained peaceful throughout the period.

== Political leader ==
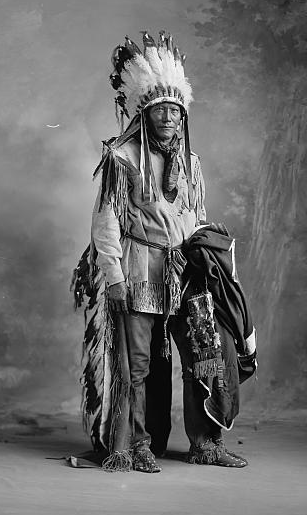
Porcupine some time after 1905

Porcupine was a chief of the Northern Cheyenne but never recognised as such by the U.S. government, probably because of his connection to the Ghost Dance. He was also a powerful medicine man; according to Marquis he had more influence than the highest status medicine man in the tribe, the Keeper of the Sacred Tepee. He was involved in four separate treaty councils with the U.S. which resulted in formal treaties, all of which he considered had been abrogated by the U.S. Porcupine was most troubled by the U.S. reneging on the treaty agreement over the Black Hills after gold was discovered there, which was the immediate cause of the 1876 war. Porcupine was the spokesman for a Cheyenne delegation to Washington during the presidency of Benjamin Harrison (1889–1893), the purpose of which was to seek reparations for treaty violations.

== Character ==
Porcupine in his preaching phase, in contrast to the young warrior, was a man of peace. Historian Thomas B. Marquis who met and wrote about Porcupine said,

As a "bad Indian" he was of the most gentle type. The high regard for him was not restricted to his own people ... Even the missionaries liked him, their only condemnation being that he was an apostle of paganism.

— Thomas B. Marquis

Porcupine had two sons. Both died of tuberculosis, a common disease amongst the Cheyenne of the reservation period, for which they had little resistance. Porcupine died in 1929.

== Bibliography ==
- Angevine, Robert G., The Railroad and the State: War, Politics, and Technology in Nineteenth-century America, Stanford University Press, 2004 ISBN 0804742391.
- Coates, Isaac Taylor; Kennedy, W. J. D., On the Plains with Custer and Hancock: The Journal of Isaac Coates, Army Surgeon, Big Earth Publishing, 1997 ISBN 155566184X.
- Crawford, Suzanne J.; Kelley, Dennis F., American Indian Religious Traditions, vol. 1, ABC-CLIO, 2005 ISBN 1576075176.
- Grinnell, George B., The Cheyenne Indians: Their History and Lifeways, World Wisdom, 2008 ISBN 1933316608.
- Hardorff, Richard G., Cheyenne Memories of the Custer Fight, University of Nebraska Press, 1998 ISBN 0803273118.
- Hittman, Michael, Wovoka and the Ghost Dance, University of Nebraska Press, 1997 ISBN 0803273088.
- Isenberg, Andrew C., The Destruction of the Bison: An Environmental History, 1750-1920, Cambridge University Press, 2000 ISBN 0521003482.
- Kraft, Louis, Ned Wynkoop and the Lonely Road from Sand Creek, University of Oklahoma Press, 2012 ISBN 0806185856.
- McLaughlin, Castle, A Lakota War Book from the Little Big Horn, Harvard University Press, 2013 ISBN 0981885861.
- Marquis, Thomas B., "The Messiah Preacher", The Cheyennes of Montana, pp. 124–136, Reference Publications, 1978 ISBN 0917256093.
- Mooney, James, "The Ghost-dance Religion and the Sioux Outbreak of 1890", Fourteenth Annual Report of the Bureau of Ethnology to the Secretary of the Smithsonian Institution 1892-3, Washington: Government Printing Office, 1896 OCLC 263587721.
- O'Neill, Robert; Robinson, Charles M., Battle on the Plains: The United States Plains Wars, The Rosen Publishing Group, 2011 ISBN 1448813344.
- Powers, Ramon; Leiker, James N., The Northern Cheyenne Exodus in History and Memory, University of Oklahoma Press, 2012 ISBN 0806185902.
- Richardson, Heather Cox, Wounded Knee: Party Politics and the Road to an American Massacre, Basic Books, 2013 ISBN 0465021301.
- Stands in Timber, John; Liberty, Margot, A Cheyenne Voice: The Complete John Stands in Timber Interviews, University of Oklahoma Press, 2013 ISBN 0806151048.
- Utley, Robert Marshall, Frontier Regulars: The United States Army and the Indian, 1866–1891, University of Nebraska Press, 1984 ISBN 0803295510.
- Williams, Henry T. (ed), Williams' Pacific Tourist Guide, H. T. Williams, 1876 OCLC 681334347.
