= William Philo Clark =

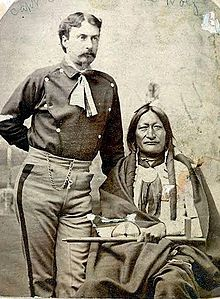
William Philo Clark and Little Hawk at the Red Cloud Agency in 1877.

William Philo Clark (July 27, 1845 – September 22, 1884) was a United States Army officer during the Plains Indian Wars.

Clark was appointed to the US Military Academy at West Point and graduated in 1868. He was assigned as a Second Lieutenant with the U.S. 2d Cavalry Regiment, to which he belonged for the remainder of his short career. Clark was then assigned to the staff of General George Crook at the end of August 1876. Crook rejoined with the columns of General Alfred Terry and Colonel John Gibbon, after the Battles of the Rosebud and the Little Bighorn during the Great Sioux War of 1876. As a member of the general's staff, White Hat Clark was present for Crook's pursuit of the Lakota during the late summer and fall of 1876, including the so-called "Starvation March" and the Battle of Slim Buttes. He served in several staff assignments for General Philip Sheridan and died suddenly at the age of 39, in Washington, DC in 1884 while on special duty with Sheridan.

He is the author of the 1885 book The Indian Sign Language which was published posthumously.
