= Wooden Leg: A Warrior Who Fought Custer =

Book by Wooden Leg and Thomas Bailey Marquis

Cover of Wooden Leg

Wooden Leg: A Warrior Who Fought Custer is a 1931 book by Thomas Bailey Marquis about the life of a Northern Cheyenne Indian, Wooden Leg, who fought in several historic battles between United States forces and the Plains Indians, including the Battle of the Little Bighorn, where he faced the troops of George Armstrong Custer. The book is of great value to historians, not only for its eyewitness accounts of battles, but also for its detailed description of the way of life of 19th-century Plains Indians.

The book was dictated to Marquis by Wooden Leg in Plains Indian Sign Language, their only common language. Marquis gathered the stories for the book from Wooden Leg and others while he was a physician at the agency in Montana from 1922. They were reluctant to open up to him at first, but eventually Marquis gained their trust.

Wooden Leg lived through some of the most turbulent times in Cheyenne history, but the book begins with his childhood and descriptions of Cheyenne customs. These include tribal organisation, the warrior societies, sport, religion and mythology, their friendship and cooperation with the Sioux, arrow recognition, warbonnet entitlement, and much more. Wooden Leg was introduced to warfare at a very young age via conflict with the Crow and joined the Elk warrior society at age 14.

The book describes Wooden Leg's participation in the important battles of the war of 1876–1877, when the Cheyenne, Sioux, and other plains tribes fought the United States. These included not only the Little Big Horn, but the preceding Battle of the Rosebud and the succeeding Dull Knife Fight. Following the Cheyenne surrender, the tribe was deported to Oklahoma, but eventually Wooden Leg was allowed to return. At Fort Keogh he worked as a scout for the army and was later appointed a judge at the Tongue River Indian Reservation. Wooden Leg describes in detail how he befriended the old chief Little Wolf towards the end of the latter's life. Little Wolf had been a great war leader but was now ostracised for having killed another Cheyenne while drunk.

Wooden Leg's description of the Battle of the Little Bighorn caused controversy when the book was first published, particularly his claim that many of the US soldiers committed suicide. This claim is still discussed by scholars and has been investigated by archeologists, but no firm conclusions have been reached.

== Publishing history ==
First published in 1931 under the title A Warrior Who Fought Custer, the book was later reprinted under its current title by the University of Nebraska Press. The book was written in the first person in the style of an autobiography by Thomas Bailey Marquis, who translated and edited Wooden Leg's stories, placing them in chronological order. The 2003 edition bills Marquis as interpreter; however, he describes himself as author in the book's original preface. Marquis went on to write several other books on the participants and events of the era.

== Research ==
Marquis wrote the book in 1930 at the age of 61, but had begun researching it in 1922. In this year Marquis, a doctor, came into contact with the Northern Cheyenne when appointed agency physician on their reservation in Montana. His initial aim was to collect first-hand accounts of the Battle of the Little Bighorn. Since there had been no white survivors, obtaining the Indian accounts was all the more important for obtaining a complete historical record. However, it took him many years to fully gain the trust of the Indians and he did not complete the task until 1930. In the meantime the project grew as Marquis added details of Wooden Leg's life before and after the events at the Little Bighorn. It eventually metamorphosed from a historical account of the battle into a biography of Wooden Leg, Marquis' principal informant.

The issue of trust was difficult to overcome. Wooden Leg himself relates the attitudes of the Cheyenne at a peace feast organised to commemorate the 30th anniversary (1906) of the Battle of the Little Bighorn. In the presence of many United States soldiers, the Cheyenne were questioned about the battle. They answered with extreme caution; many facts, particularly regarding the deaths of US soldiers, were avoided. Despite the long passage of time since the battle, they feared that they were being trapped into incriminating admissions. They also chose not to reveal that they believed that many soldiers had died through suicide or at the hands of their comrades, as they knew this issue had made soldiers angry in the past. They left most of the talking to one boastful Indian, Two Moons, who gave a colourful—but entirely inaccurate—account. The others elected not to contradict him since this allowed them to remain silent. Marquis slowly broke down the barriers and eventually persuaded all the Cheyenne survivors he was in contact with, not just Wooden Leg, to open up to him.

Some sixteen hundred Northern Cheyenne were at the battle of the Little Big Horn. For all of the intervening period of more than fifty years between the battle and Marquis' interviews, the Cheyenne had lived in Montana at sites overlooking the battlegrounds. In Marquis' view, this made them the most reliable of witnesses because their continual retelling of the stories was always anchored in the visible reality of the locations before them.

Wooden Leg spoke little English and Marquis spoke no Cheyenne. They communicated mainly through Plains Indian Sign Language and only occasionally used an interpreter. Wooden Leg provided maps and sketches as well as narrative. The book is an amalgam of material from Wooden Leg along with support and corroboration from many contributors, including most of the seventeen Northern Cheyenne participants of the Battle of the Little Big Horn still alive at the time of the interviews. From these, Marquis gives specific credits to Limpy, Pine, Bobtail Horse, Sun Bear, Black Horse, Two Feathers, Wolf Chief, Little Sun, Blackbird, Big Beaver, White Moon, White Wolf, Big Crow, Medicine Bull, and the younger Little Wolf. The last is a different person from the more well known Chief Little Wolf who led the Northern Cheyenne Exodus from Oklahoma in 1877–79.

== Synopsis ==
=== Early years ===
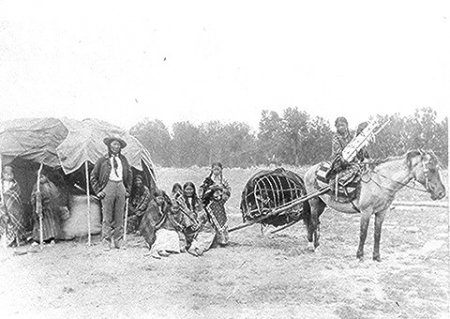
Cheyenne woman pulling a travois behind her horse. When moving camp, the travois were constructed using lodge poles. Small children travelled in the travois basket; older ones jumped on and off at will. Wooden Leg states that the Cheyenne were capable of outrunning the US cavalry travelling in this way.

Wooden Leg was born in 1858 in the Black Hills. His father was previously known as Many Bullet Wounds. Wooden Leg took his own name from an admired uncle of the same name who was a tireless walker, an ability which Wooden Leg shared. The meaning is that his legs must be made of wood since they feel no pain no matter what the exertion. Warfare was common, and the narrative is soon describing a conflict with the Crow.

Wooden Leg took part in fighting from a very young age. The Cheyenne were involved in many conflicts with other Indian tribes, especially the neighbouring Crows, but also the Shoshone. They also fought US soldiers; his elder brother was killed in the fight at Fort Phil Kearny during Red Cloud's attempt to clear the Bozeman Trail of US forts.

The hardships of hunting in the snow with minimal clothing as a boy are described, as are the unique Indian methods of transport during camp moves. In his early life Wooden Leg travelled all around the Black Hills region and along the Tongue and Powder Rivers.

=== Cheyenne ways of life ===
According to Wooden Leg, at the top of the tribal organisation were four "old men" tribal chiefs, and under these were forty "big chiefs". The Northern Cheyenne, along with other Plains Indian tribes, had a number of warrior societies; each of these was led by a warrior chief helped by nine little warrior chiefs. In Wooden Leg's time, there were three Northern Cheyenne warrior societies: the Elk, the Crazy Dog and the Fox. The tribal chiefs delegated executive authority to one or the other of the warrior societies. These would put into action the requirements for war, hunting expeditions, and camp moves as decided by the tribal chiefs. The currently designated warrior society also acted as police.

At age 14 Wooden Leg joined the Elk society, a big event in the young boy's life. By the rules of Cheyenne society, the currently "on duty" warrior society had sole prerogative in the task at hand. Members of other societies were not allowed to get in front of their scouts in a camp move, nor to approach the buffalo in a hunt. Of course, teenage boys are wont to push the boundaries and Wooden Leg was no exception. Several episodes are related where he and his friends are reprimanded and narrowly avoid serious punishment.

Sport events and betting were usual between the warrior societies, and a great many contests of all kinds took place. If the Cheyenne happened to be travelling with the Sioux, their warrior societies also took part. Chief Little Wolf, who had been a great distance runner in his youth, was once jokingly challenged by an Ogallala Sioux when he was in his fifties. Little Wolf accepted this challenge and won, despite being behind for most of the race, by intelligently pacing himself.

Many mythological or magical stories are found in the book. One tale recounts a Cheyenne version of the story of the great bear which is supposed to have put its claw marks on the side of Devils Tower, a feature later seen in the film Close Encounters of the Third Kind. Much else of Cheyenne life is documented, as the book includes a guide to arrow recognition and information on marriage customs and the entitlement to wear warbonnets, amongst many other subjects. As Wooden Leg puts all this in perspective by comparison with other Plains tribes, the reader also learns much about other tribes, especially the Sioux.

The Cheyenne deity is called by Wooden Leg the Great Medicine. A sacred tepee in the camp holds the tribal medicine object, which in the case of the Northern Cheyenne is a Buffalo Head. Because of this, buffalo heads often appear in Cheyenne myths and ceremonies. Wooden Leg first "made medicine", an important event for him, at age 17 under the supervision of an experienced old medicine man. Making medicine is a form of contemplative worship that involves fasting, prayer, and sometimes the infliction of pain (as in the Sun Dance). Making medicine takes place in a specially constructed medicine lodge.

=== War of 1876–1877 ===
After the Indians were driven out of the Black Hills, (Note: They were driven out by the influx of illegal prospectors during the Black Hills Gold Rush.) Wooden Leg's family chose not to live on the reservation, but instead took advantage of a provision in the Fort Laramie treaty for Indian hunting grounds between the Black Hills and the Bighorn River. They decided to live permanently in the hunting grounds, staying out of contact with the white man as far as possible. Other Cheyenne and Sioux also chose to do this, but most spent at least the winter on their reservations. When reservation Indians arrived in camp with rare goods such as tobacco and sugar, it was a cause for celebration.

In February 1876 they received news that the US intended to make war on all Indians who did not return to their reservations. The report was initially not believed; they were not fighting the white man and were acting within the provisions of the treaty. However, after similar information was brought by respected chiefs, the Cheyenne started posting good lookouts. Soon Wooden Leg and his friends were in a skirmish with a party of soldiers. In the subsequent ongoing fighting of the Great Sioux War of 1876–77, Wooden Leg took part in nearly every major engagement.

Towards the end of winter, the Cheyenne camp on Powder River was attacked and destroyed; however, most of the Indians escaped. (Note: Troops in this engagement were commanded by Colonel Joseph Reynolds. Marquis (q.v., p.168) has his rank as General, but other sources (Cozzens, p.xxxiii; Bourke, p.465) list him as a Colonel under Brigadier General Crook. Reynolds believed he was attacking Crazy Horse's camp rather than the Cheyenne.) Because they now had no possessions during winter, the Cheyenne moved to join their allies, the Ogallala Sioux, led by Crazy Horse. Together they moved north-east to Chalk Butte to join the Uncpapa Sioux, led by Sitting Bull. At some point the Minneconjoux Sioux under Lame Deer also joined the group. The Indians had to continually move their camp to find enough game and grazing for the large numbers of people and horses. The Arrows all Gone Sioux (Note: Marquis' rendering of Sans Arcs.) then joined, and then the Blackfeet Sioux. Small groups of other tribes, such as the Waist and Skirt Indians, (Note: The Waist and Skirt Indians were the Wahpeton band of the Santee Sioux, a division of the Dakota. They had been living as refugees in Canada since the Dakota War of 1862. They were so called by Wooden Leg's people because of their extreme poverty, lacking even most clothing. Marquis, q.v., p.182.) the Assiniboines, and Burned Thigh Sioux also joined. Even Chief Lame White Man was there with a small group of Southern Cheyenne.

Wooden Leg believed that the chiefs had gathered the tribes in one place for defence, not to prepare to make war on the whites, though many of the young men were keen to do just that. On the other hand, they made no attempt to hide. Wooden Leg says "our trail ... could have been followed by a blind person" since it was between a quarter and half a mile wide. While on a scouting mission, Wooden Leg and his group spotted soldiers coming from the south (Note: Brigadier General George Crook's column.) towards their camp on the Rosebud River. Wooden Leg took part in the ensuing Battle of the Rosebud, in which the soldiers were driven off.

==== Little Bighorn ====
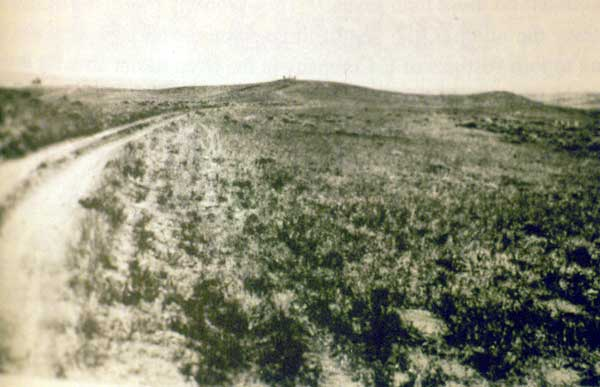
View looking from Battle Ridge towards Custer Hill. To the right of Custer Hill is Wooden Leg Hill, so named because Wooden Leg was at this position at one point during the Custer fight and describes the death of a war bonnet Sioux sharpshooter who was killed through exposing himself to the enemy once too often. Photograph by H.R. Locke, 1894

The Indians placed their camp circles with the openings facing east in the valley of the Little Bighorn river. The camps occupied a considerable area and its total size was difficult to assess. The river was to the north-east of the camp and beyond that was a high ridge of hills.

The Indians were not expecting further trouble from the soldiers; they were relaxing and recuperating. Wooden Leg attended an organised social dance the night before the battle. On the day of the battle, Wooden Leg had bathed and was awoken from a nap to find the camp in a panic. The commotion was caused by US soldiers under Major Marcus Reno attacking from the south-east on the orders of Lieutenant Colonel George Custer. Wooden Leg was torn between his desire to quickly join the battle and the need to first put on his best clothes and paint his face (it was the Indian custom to always look one's best if there was any possibility of ending up in the afterlife). He was only stopped from oiling and braiding his hair as well when his father urged him to hurry.

The Indians drove back and pinned down Reno's soldiers, but then spotted additional troops making their way along the hills to the east of the encampment. This force was led by Custer himself, though that name would have meant nothing to Wooden Leg and the other Cheyenne at the time. Most of the Indians broke off their fight with Reno to engage Custer and his soldiers. Wooden Leg went back through the camp in the river valley rather than directly uphill towards the soldiers. While he was there, his father tried to dissuade him from further fighting on the grounds that he had already done enough, but Wooden Leg would not hear of it, and even persuaded others to rejoin the fight and take part in the total annihilation of Custer's command.

After the Custer fight, Wooden Leg helped save Little Wolf's life. A group of Sioux were angry that Little Wolf had arrived after the fight, accused him of aiding the soldiers, and threatened to kill him. Wooden Leg, who had accompanied the Sioux and knew Little Wolf, was fluent in the Sioux language, so he presented Little Wolf's case for him, as he could not speak Sioux himself. It was not realised by the Indians at the time, but it had been the actions of Little Wolf's small band that had provoked Custer into a premature attack when he wrongly believed his presence had become known to the main body of Indians.

Custer's command had been wiped out, but Reno and his soldiers were still present. Wooden Leg returned to fight them that night and again the next morning with a handful of comrades. Initially firing without success from the high ground, Wooden Leg descended into the gulch to lie in wait for soldiers coming to fetch water. He succeeded in killing a man (Private J. J. Tanner.)

Wooden Leg describes the recovery of many objects from the dead soldiers, some of which the Indians did not understand, such as a compass and a pocketwatch. He threw away paper money he found, not realising its value. He gave away coins even though he knew their value, because he had no wish to trade with white men. When a new column of soldiers was observed approaching (the main force of infantry under Brigadier General Alfred Terry), the council of Chiefs decided not to continue the fight. At this point the Indians disengaged and the entire camp packed up and relocated.

==== Parting of the tribes ====
The tribes travelled together for some weeks, camping at various locations in the Bighorn Valley and along the Rosebud and Tongue Rivers. After arriving back at the Cheyennes' starting point on Powder River, the tribes decided to split up. It was becoming too difficult to hunt enough food to provide for everyone, and the danger seemed to be over.

As winter approached, Wooden Leg joined a small war party on a raid into Crow territory. On the return journey they visited the site of the Little Bighorn battle, looking for rifle cartridges and whatever else they could scavenge. Wooden Leg remarks that there were a large number of soldier boot bottoms; the Indians had no use for complete boots, so they cut the tops off to use the leather to make other items.

As they came down the Tongue River valley, the group was surprised by the sight of the entire Northern Cheyenne tribe on the move. They had been attacked at the Powder River camp by soldiers and Pawnee Indians. The camp had been destroyed and they had lost all their possessions. They searched for the Ogallala Sioux under Crazy Horse, who they eventually found at Beaver Creek. The Ogallala welcomed them and together they journeyed to Tongue River. As they had now sufficiently replenished their supplies, the Cheyenne decided to separate at Hanging Woman Creek in early 1877. While they were in the process of doing so, they were attacked by soldiers. (Note: Under the command of Colonel Nelson Miles. Marquis gives his rank as general, (q.v., p.295) but Miles did not receive his promotion to Brigadier General until 1880. Miles, p.207.) Wooden Leg's sister was captured in this engagement. Wooden Leg rode to attempt a rescue, but was driven back by gunfire from the soldiers. Most of the Indians escaped down Tongue River; the soldiers did not follow and the Cheyenne hunted peacefully for several months.

==== Surrender ====
As spring approached, the Cheyenne received envoys from Bear Coat, the Cheyenne name for Colonel Nelson Miles, future Commanding General of the United States Army, (Note: The Cheyenne believed that Miles was in command of the campaign against them, since it was to him that they surrendered. They knew nothing of Terry or Custer. In reality Miles arrived after the Little Bighorn fight. Marquis, q.v., p.377.) inviting them to surrender. They received encouraging reports from released prisoners, who said that they were being well treated. The chiefs decide to move the tribe closer to Fort Keogh, at the mouth of Tongue River, without yet committing to a surrender. They stopped at Powder River and sent a delegation of chiefs to the fort to negotiate. While negotiations were proceeding, Wooden Leg heard of the suicide of his sister, Crooked Nose, who was still a prisoner in the fort.

After discussion, the tribal chiefs decided they would go to their agency, which was the same agency as their friends the Ogallalas, and surrender there instead. Most of the tribe followed the chiefs, but everyone was allowed to make their own decision. Most of Wooden Leg's family decided to surrender at the agency, but he and his brother Yellow Hair joined one of several groups who chose not to surrender at either place. This group was led by the Fox warrior society chief Last Bull. The small band, however, was unable to hunt sufficient food and slowly became weaker. Eventually they too travelled to the agency and surrendered. (Note: White River agency, Fort Robinson, Nebraska, Marquis, q.v., p.304.) At first they were satisfied with their situation, but then came word that they were to be moved south to Oklahoma. Along with many others, Wooden Leg was shocked and angered by this news. They had expected to be able to continue to live in their homeland. However, there was nothing that could be done, as they had all given up their guns and horses on entering the agency.

=== Oklahoma ===
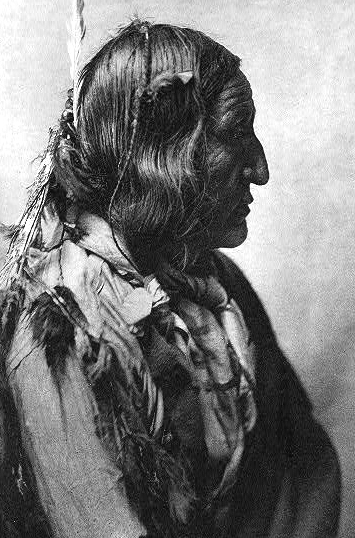
Little Wolf

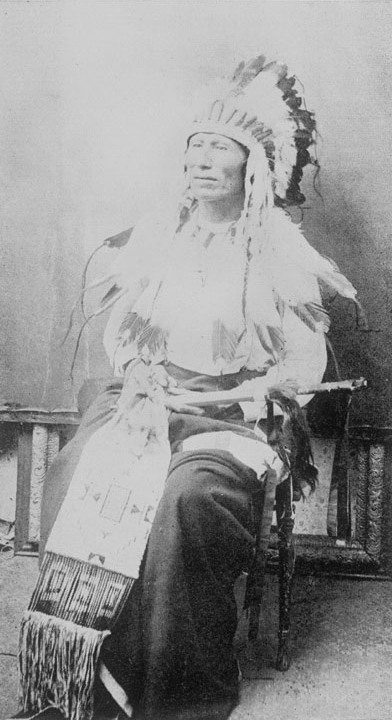
Dull Knife

The journey to Oklahoma began in May 1877 and took 70 days. A few Indians fled the agency when the news was announced, amongst them Wooden Leg's brother Yellow Hair. While in Oklahoma Wooden Leg received news that Yellow Hair had been killed by white men while out hunting. Wooden Leg hunted on the reservation, but there was no large game to be had and the Indians were not allowed to leave. Nor were they being fed as promised, and there was much sickness. Little Wolf campaigned for action, and eventually he and Dull Knife led much of the tribe off the reservation to fight their way back North.

Wooden Leg and his father stayed on the reservation hoping that food would eventually be provided. He was in frequent contact with the Southern Cheyenne during this period. He learnt from them who Custer was; the Southern Cheyenne were very familiar with him from the Battle of Washita River (1868). Wooden Leg learned that the Southern Cheyenne had tried to come north to fight with them in the summer of 1876, but had met too much opposition from US soldiers. Finally, Wooden Leg took a wife from amongst the Southern Cheyenne.

After six years in the south, the Northern Cheyenne were given permission to leave, either to join Little Wolf or to go to the Pine Ridge agency (formerly White River agency). Wooden Leg's father had died in the south, but he and the rest of his family departed for Pine Ridge and later relocated to the Tongue River country, where most of the tribe were living.

=== Changed times ===
Many changes had taken place in the north. Cheyennes were now acting as scouts for the US Army, as had previously been done by the hated Pawnees, Crows, and Shoshones. Little Wolf had had his chiefship revoked after he killed a man while drunk. In 1889, at age 31, Wooden Leg himself joined the army scouts at Fort Keogh. There was not much to do; he spent most of his time learning to drink whisky. The following year the Cheyenne scouts were involved in a campaign against rebellious Sioux, and Wooden Leg was present at the Wounded Knee Massacre. The Cheyenne scouts had prepared themselves to fight (on the US side) but were not called upon to do so.

Wooden Leg befriended the exiled Little Wolf towards the end of that great chief's life. Wooden Leg said that no one had "bad hearts" against Little Wolf for the murder; even the dead man's brother, Bald Eagle, said "Little Wolf did not kill my brother, it was the white man whisky that did it". Little Wolf was interred standing upright in a pile of stones overlooking the Rosebud valley.

Wooden Leg attended a "peace feast" at the Little Bighorn to commemorate the 30th anniversary of the battle. Some Cheyenne veterans would not go, fearful of retribution from the soldiers present. As late as 1926 there were still Cheyennes who would not go to the 50th anniversary. Wooden Leg himself did not attend the 50th anniversary, not out of fear, but because the site was now on Crow land, to whom he still felt much animosity. He had resolved "never again to go to any place where I might be called upon to shake hands with a Crow". This was very different to his attitude to other former enemies such as the Shoshones, to whom he travelled on a friendly visit. In 1913 Wooden Leg was part of a Cheyenne delegation to Washington. He also visited New York and Philadelphia during this trip.

Around 1908 he was baptised a Christian. However, he still privately prayed to the Great Medicine, feeling more comfortable praying this way. From 1927, the Cheyenne were again allowed to hold their annual Great Medicine dance (the Sun Dance). Other customs were still forbidden: anyone practising Indian medicine could end up in jail. Wooden Leg was appointed by the US government as a judge on the agency. In this capacity he was obliged to enforce a ruling forbidding multiple wives. He found this difficult, not least because he had two wives himself. He felt obliged to set an example by being the first to send away a wife. After ten years, clearly struggling with his conscience, Wooden Leg resigned the post, but was later persuaded to take it on again by a new Indian agent.

Wooden Leg hoped that his two daughters would have a more comfortable life than his. The younger, however, died unexpectedly of an illness. Later the other daughter died. Wooden Leg then adopted his grandnephew, Joseph White Wolf, and brought him up as his own. The story ends with Wooden Leg an old man who is increasingly unable to farm his land. But he is well off compared to most Cheyennes, as he had a pension from his scouting days and his pay as a judge. He appreciates the comfortable life he now has but thinks much about the old days when "every man had to be brave".

== Academic importance ==
Wooden Leg is an important original source of information on the Cheyenne and Plains Indians in general and on the Battle of the Little Big Horn in particular. Many hundreds of books have been written about the Great Sioux War, its battles, and its characters. A large number of these books have looked to Marquis to provide source material. This is especially true of the Custer fight, where there is a shortage of eyewitness accounts from the United States side. Books on social issues and archaeology also find usable material in Wooden Leg on the topic of Plains Indians. A small selection of the hundreds of books that use Wooden Leg as a reference are listed at the end of this article.

Wooden Leg is also regularly cited in papers in academic journals. Those addressing social and educational issues are found just as often as those in historical journals. Again, a selection of such papers is given at the foot of this article.

As well as source information for Cheyenne military and social history, the book is a rich source of anecdotes. One tale describes how Wooden Leg and Little Bird chase a fleeing Reno soldier. Neither Indian was willing to shoot a fleeing man, as it "seemed not brave" to do so. This did not prevent the soldier from shooting Little Bird, after which Wooden Leg clubbed the soldier off his horse. Wooden Leg describes the screams of his mother when she is presented with a scalp as a present. In another story, Wooden Leg is sitting in the lodge with his friend, Noisy Walking, who is dying of his battle wounds. He wants to support his friend but doesn't know what to say. There are many other examples.

== Reviews ==
=== New York Times, 1931 ===
The review in The New York Times after the book's first publication finds Marquis' writing praiseworthy. The reviewer notes that the details of the Cheyenne lifestyle are "deeply interesting". However, most of the review is taken up with challenges to the factual accuracy of the Indian account of the Battle of the Little Bighorn.

Despite the only surviving eyewitnesses to these events being from the Indian side and the passage of time since the battle, many of the details given by the Indian participants were still controversial and not believed (Custer's widow Libbie, who had dedicated her life to enshrining the memory of her husband as a hero and who attacked anyone offering a different point of view, was still alive). Special exception is taken to the claim that many of Custer's men committed suicide when defeat seemed inevitable. The claim that Tom Custer's body was decapitated by the Indians is also disputed for reasons that are not made clear. The identification of the headless body as Tom Custer is not from Wooden Leg, who at the time of the battle knew nothing of either Custer or his brother Tom, but is information provided by Marquis. Wooden Leg had merely described the markings he saw on the body. Tom Custer's biography describes the decapitation as indisputable fact, as the body was identified from tattoos.

=== Richard Littlebear ===
Dr. Richard Littlebear, a Northern Cheyenne himself, provides an introduction to the 2003 edition of the book. He is president of Chief Dull Knife College and an educator who writes about Indian culture and language. He describes how his career choice was inspired by his reading an earlier edition of the book while an undergraduate.

Littlebear is most struck by the rapid transition of a free and independent people to a society restricted to reservations and dependent on the federal government. He expresses bitterness against the US government and shows some expression of shame at the part played by Cheyenne scouts for actions such as their role in locating Chief Joseph during his epic but ultimately futile attempt to escape US government control. He notes that Wooden Leg himself describes a sense of shame when talking about the latter part of his life.

Littlebear believes the book helps explain the historical origins of the modern attitudes of the Northern Cheyenne towards other tribes. For instance, the Crow are traditionally enemies of the Cheyenne and the Sioux are traditionally allies. Littlebear says that although he knew of these prejudices, he did not understand the underlying reasons until he read this book. Ted Rising Sun's humorous claim that the alliance with the Sioux was only because the Cheyenne "needed someone to hold the horses" only emphasises their friendship. This claim, repeated by others, possibly originated because after the Sioux's migration into the Black Hills region, they obtained their first horses from the Cheyenne. Ted Rising Sun is a descendant of Chief Dull Knife, a major figure in Cheyenne history and a contemporary of Wooden Leg.

== Suicide controversy ==
The theory that Custer's soldiers committed suicide en masse toward the end of the Battle of the Little Bighorn has been controversial right from the very start, and the discussion still continues today. Marquis was a keen advocate of this theory and developed it most fully in a later book, Keep the Last Bullet for Yourself. The notion was so controversial that he could not find a publisher, and the book did not appear in print until long after his death.

Marquis has many critics who say he either exaggerated the role played by suicide or is entirely mistaken; Hardorff says the theory is discounted by most academics. Hardorff suggests that Marquis may have made errors due to the use of sign language which, he claims, cannot convey the nuances of language. Despite this criticism, Hardorff still maintains that Marquis' work is of great importance. There can be no doubt that Wooden Leg is indeed relating a tale of mass suicide. In the book he discusses at length what may have been the cause. (Note: The idea of suicide to avoid capture was unknown to the Indians. Marquis, q.v., p.246.) The effects of whisky was a common theory amongst the Indians, but Wooden Leg believed the prayers of medicine men to have been the cause. Wooden Leg's only taste of whisky up to the time of the battle had been a mouthful—which he immediately spat out—that he took from a captured bottle. In later life Wooden Leg changed his mind and subscribed to the whisky theory after experiencing the effects of alcohol first-hand.

R. A. Fox and others note that while Wooden Leg's version is corroborated by the oral tradition of other Cheyenne witnesses, notably that of Kate Bighead, (Note: Bighead was the subject of a biography written by Marquis.) a young woman who witnessed the battle, there is no corroboration in the oral tradition of the Sioux. Fox concludes that "quite simply, the contention is nonsense. A few troopers undoubtedly took their own lives, but it is hard to know what factors fostered the idea of wholesale suicide". Fox in his turn has been criticised for selectively using Indian oral tradition when it suits him, but discarding it as nonsense when he finds it disagreeable.

Another suggestion is that the Cheyenne warriors, pressed to recount details of the Custer battle, were still reluctant to admit to killing soldiers for fear of punishment. A simple way out of this dilemma was to say when questioned by non-Indians that most of the soldiers died at their own hands. Researchers R. A. Fox and Thom Hatch say that Wooden Leg retracted the claim in later life; this would have been in extreme old age, as he had still not recanted at the age of 73 when the book was written, other than to say it was whisky that was the cause rather than prayer. In his book Cheyenne Memories, John Stands In Timber, tribal historian for the Northern Cheyenne, agrees: "Wooden Leg said some other things (in his book) he took back later. One was that the soldiers were drunk, and many killed themselves. I went with two army men to see him one time. They wanted to find out about it. I interpreted ... and we asked him if it were true that the Indians said the soldiers did that. He laughed and said there were just too many Indians. The soldiers did their best. He said if they had been drunk they would not have killed as many as they did. But it was in the book."

Archaeologists have attempted to test the suicide theory, particularly by the examination of the remains of skulls, but have been unable to reach a conclusion. The suicide theory cannot be ruled out by the archaeological evidence, but there is no evidence to support it either.

== Bibliography ==
- Thomas B. Marquis (interpreter), Wooden Leg, Wooden Leg: A Warrior Who Fought Custer, University of Nebraska Press, 2003 ISBN 0-8032-8288-5.
- John Gregory Bourke, The Diaries of John Gregory Bourke: July 29, 1876 – April 7, 1878, University of North Texas Press, 2005 ISBN 1-57441-196-9.
- Peter Cozzens, Eyewitnesses to the Indian Wars, 1865–1890: Volume 4, The Long War for the Northern Plains, Stackpole Books, 2001 ISBN 0-8117-0080-1.
- Carl F. Day, Tom Custer: Ride to Glory, University of Oklahoma Press, 2005 ISBN 0-8061-3687-1.
- Fred Dustin, The Custer Tragedy: Events Leading up to and Following the Little Big Horn Campaign of 1876, Upton, 1987 ISBN 0-912783-10-9.
- Michael A. Elliott, Custerology: The Enduring Legacy of the Indian Wars and George Armstrong Custer, University of Chicago Press, 2008 ISBN 0-226-20147-3.
- Everall Fox, "Indian education for all: a tribal college perspective", The Phi Delta Kappan, vol.88, No. 3 (Nov., 2006), pp. 208–212. (subscription required)
- Richard A. Fox, Archaeology, History, and Custer's Last Battle: The Little Big Horn Reexamined, University of Oklahoma Press, 2003 ISBN 0-8061-2998-0.
- W. J. Ghent, "Custer's fight on the Little Big Horn River", The New York Times Book Review, May 24, 1931, page BR7 (subscription required).
- George Bird Grinnell, The Fighting Cheyennes, Digital Scanning Inc, 2004 (reproduction of Charles Scribner's Sons, 1915) ISBN 1-58218-391-0.
- George Bird Grinnell, The Cheyenne Indians, Volume 2, University of Nebraska Press, 1962 (reproduction of Yale University Press, 1923) ISBN 080327131X.
- Richard G. Hardorff, Cheyenne Memories of the Custer Fight, University of Nebraska Press, 1998 ISBN 0-8032-7311-8.
- Thom Hatch, Custer and the Battle of the Little Bighorn: an Encyclopedia of the People, Places, Events, Indian Culture and Customs, Information Sources, Art and Films, McFarland & Co., 1997 ISBN 0-7864-0154-0.
- Thom Hatch, The Custer Companion: A Comprehensive Guide to the Life of George Armstrong Custer and the Plains Indian Wars, Stackpole Books, 2002 ISBN 0-8117-0477-7.
- Margot Liberty, "Cheyenne primacy: the tribes' perspective as opposed to that of the United States Army; a possible alternative to "The Great Sioux War Of 1876"", Friends Of The Little Bighorn Battlefield, November 2006.
- Thomas Bailey Marquis, Keep the Last Bullet for Yourself: The True Story of Custer's Last Stand, Two Continents Pub. Group, 1976 ISBN 0-8467-0156-1.
- Thomas Bailey Marquis, Kate Bighead, She Watched Custer's Last Battle: Her Story, Interpreted in 1927, Hardin Tribune, Herald Print, 1935.
- Nelson Appleton Miles, Serving the Republic, BiblioBazaar, LLC, 2009 (reproduction of Harper & Bros., 1911) ISBN 1-116-26380-7.
- Charles M. Robinson, The Plains Wars, 1757–1900, Taylor & Francis, 2003 ISBN 0-415-96912-3.
- Douglas D. Scott, Archaeological Perspectives on the Battle of the Little Bighorn, University of Oklahoma Press, 2000 ISBN 0-8061-3292-2.
- John Stands In Timber, Margot Liberty, Cheyenne Memories, Yale University Press, 1998 ISBN 0300073003
- Thomas D. Weist, "Editor's introduction", in Thomas Bailey Marquis, The Cheyennes of Montana, Reference Publications, 1978 ISBN 0917256042.

== Works citing this book ==
=== Books ===
- Kingsley M. Bray, Crazy Horse: A Lakota Life, University of Oklahoma Press, 2008 ISBN 0-8061-3986-2.
- Dee Brown, Hampton Sides, Bury My Heart at Wounded Knee: An Indian History of the American West, Sterling Publishing Company, Inc., 2009 ISBN 1-4027-6066-3.
- H. David Brumble, An Annotated Bibliography of American Indian and Eskimo Autobiographies, University of Nebraska Press, 1981 ISBN 0-8032-1175-9.
- Colin Gordon Calloway, Our Hearts Fell to the Ground: Plains Indian Views of How the West was Lost, Bedford Books of St. Martin's Press, 1996 ISBN 0-312-13354-5.
- Thomas W. Dunlay, Wolves for the Blue Soldiers: Indian Scouts and Auxiliaries with the United States Army, 1860–90, University of Nebraska Press, 1987ISBN 0803265735.
- William Alexander Graham, The Custer Myth, Stackpole Books, 2000 ISBN 0-8117-2726-2.
- Jerome A. Greene, Lakota and Cheyenne: Indian Views of the Great Sioux War, 1876–1877, University of Oklahoma Press, 2000 ISBN 0-8061-3245-0.
- Thom Hatch, The Custer Companion: A Comprehensive Guide to the Life of George Armstrong Custer and the Plains Indian Wars, Stackpole Books, 2002 ISBN 0-8117-0477-7.
- Gary R. Lock, Brian Leigh Molyneaux, Confronting Scale in Archaeology: Issues of Theory and Practice, Springer, 2007 ISBN 0-387-75701-5.
- Gregory Michno, Lakota Noon: The Indian Narrative of Custer's Defeat, Mountain Press Pub., 1997 ISBN 0-87842-356-7.
- John H. Monnett, Tell Them We Are Going Home: The Odyssey of the Northern Cheyennes, University of Oklahoma Press, 2004 ISBN 0-8061-3645-6.
- Wayne Moquin, Charles Lincoln Van Doren, Great Documents in American Indian History, Da Capo Press, 1995 ISBN 0-306-80659-2.
- Peter J. Powell, Sweet Medicine: The Continuing Role of the Sacred Arrows, the Sun Dance, and the Sacred Buffalo Hat in Northern Cheyenne History, Volume 1, University of Oklahoma Press, 1998 ISBN 0-8061-3028-8.
- Charles M. Robinson, A Good Year to Die: The Story of the Great Sioux War, Random House, 1995 ISBN 0-679-43025-3.
- Charles M. Robinson, The Plains Wars, 1757–1900, Taylor & Francis, 2003 ISBN 0-415-96912-3.
- Douglas D. Scott, Archaeological Perspectives on the Battle of the Little Bighorn, University of Oklahoma Press, 2000 ISBN 0-8061-3292-2.
- Richard Scott, Eyewitness to the Old West: First-Hand Accounts of Exploration, Adventure, and Peril, Roberts Rinehart Publishers, 2004 ISBN 1-57098-426-3.
- Sherry L. Smith, Sagebrush Soldier: Private William Earl Smith's View of the Sioux War of 1876, University of Oklahoma Press, 2001 ISBN 0-8061-3335-X.
- John Stands In Timber, Margot Liberty, Cheyenne Memories, Yale University Press, 1998 ISBN 0300073003
- Robert Marshall Utley, The Lance and the Shield: The Life and Times of Sitting Bull, Ballantine Books, 1994 ISBN 0-345-38938-7.
- Robert M. Utley, Sitting Bull: The Life and Times of an American Patriot, Henry Holt and Co., 2008 ISBN 0-8050-8830-X.
- Paul Robert Walker, Remember Little Bighorn: Indians, Soldiers, and Scouts Tell Their Stories, National Geographic Society, 2006 ISBN 0-7922-5521-6.
- James Welch, Paul Stekler, Killing Custer: The Battle of Little Bighorn and the Fate of the Plains Indians, W.W. Norton, 2007 ISBN 0-393-32939-9.
- James Willert, Little Big Horn Diary: A Chronicle of the 1876 Indian War, Upton, 1997 ISBN 0-912783-27-3.

=== Journal articles ===
- Rosemary Agonito and Joseph Agonito, "Resurrecting History's Forgotten Women: A Case Study from the Cheyenne Indians", Frontiers: A Journal of Women Studies, vol.6, no.3 (Autumn, 1981), pp. 8–16, University of Nebraska Press. (subscription required)
- Michael Allen and Lawrence Lashbrook, "Enhancing Middle Grades Social Studies through Biography", The Clearing House, vol.54, no.2 (October, 1980), pp. 71–74, Heldref Publications. (subscription required)
- Robert Anderson, "The Buffalo Men, a Cheyenne Ceremony of Petition Deriving from the Sutaio", Southwestern Journal of Anthropology, vol.12, no.1 (Spring, 1956), pp. 92–104, University of New Mexico. (subscription required)
- Beth Ladow, "Sanctuary: Native Border Crossings and the North American West", American Review of Canadian Studies, vol.31, nos.1&2 June 2001, pp. 25–42, doi:10.1080/02722010109481580. (subscription required)
- John H. Moore, "The Developmental Cycle of Cheyenne Polygyny", American Indian Quarterly, vol.15, 1991, pp. 311–325. (subscription required)
- John H. Moore, "Cheyenne Political History, 1820–1894", Ethnohistory, vol.21, no.4 (Autumn, 1974), pp. 329–359, Duke University Press. (subscription required)
- Smits, David D. (1998). ""Fighting Fire with Fire": The Frontier Army's Use of Indian Scouts and Allies in the Trans-Mississippi Campaigns, 1860–1890". American Indian Culture and Research Journal. 22 (1): 73–116.
- Anna Lee Stensland, "American Indian Culture: Promises, Problems, and Possibilities", The English Journal, vol.60, no.9 (December, 1971), pp. 1195–1200, National Council of Teachers of English. (subscription required)
- Bill Tallbull, Sherri Deaver, Halcyon La Point, "A new way to study cultural landscapes: the Blue Earth Hills assessment", Landscape and Urban Planning, vol.36, no.2 (November, 1996), pp. 125–133, ISSN 0169-2046, doi:10.1016/S0169-2046(96)00335-0. (subscription required)
