= Sansarc, South Dakota =

Unincorporated community in South Dakota, US

Coordinates: 44°30′24″N 101°02′06″W

Sansarc is an unincorporated community in Stanley County, in the U.S. state of South Dakota.

== History ==
A post office called Sansarc was established in 1906, and remained in operation until 1954. The community took its name from nearby Sansarc Creek.
