= Thomas Bailey Marquis =

Author and physician

Thomas B. Marquis

Thomas Bailey Marquis (December 19, 1869 – March 22, 1935) was an American self-taught historian and ethnographer who wrote about the Plains Indians and other subjects of the American frontier. He had a special interest in the destruction of George Armstrong Custer's battalion at the Battle of the Little Bighorn, which became his lifelong obsession. Marquis' body of work is valued by historians for his recording of the life stories of several Plains Indians and his writing on their way of life, particularly those involved in the Custer fight, notably Wooden Leg in A Warrior Who Fought Custer. Marquis carried out this research at a time when few were interested in the Indian version of events, even though no American soldiers survived the Custer fight. Marquis' work is thus both unique and unrepeatable.

Marquis developed his own theories regarding the history of the Cheyenne. One idea in particular, that many of Custer's men committed suicide when the situation became hopeless, proved to be highly controversial. This idea first surfaced in the Wooden Leg narrative, but was most fully developed in Keep the Last Bullet for Yourself, considered by Marquis to be his most important work and the culmination of his Custer research. The latter was not published during Marquis' life; much of his work did not appear in print until the 1970s. The last book to be published, The Cheyennes of Montana (pub. 1978), is regarded as especially valuable by historians. In 2006 a collection of his photographs was published as, A Northern Cheyenne Album.

Marquis was born in Missouri and trained for a career as a printworker. He moved to Montana because he wanted an adventure in the West, but ended up staying there for the remainder of his life. At first he worked as an itinerant printer, but after getting married he trained in medicine and became a physician. The idea was to have a more settled lifestyle, especially after his first daughter was born, but Marquis seemed to have a wanderlust, frequently changing location and often considering a change of career (he qualified as an attorney at one point). This became especially apparent after his military service in World War I and the failure of his marriage. These moves were always within Montana, and his final location was in Hardin on the Crow Reservation close to the Custer battle site. He founded a museum there that has now been incorporated into the Little Bighorn Battlefield National Monument.

Marquis first took up writing around the turn of the century, writing newspaper articles. In 1922 he was appointed agency physician to the Northern Cheyenne. He resigned after only ten weeks, but he was there long enough to realize that several participants of the Custer battle were still alive. Between 1923 and 1926 Marquis practiced medicine privately on the Crow Reservation but then tried to make writing his permanent career. Throughout his life Marquis was often in debt; his writing was sometimes interrupted by the need to earn money at medicine, or even his original career of typesetting. From 1926 he returned to his contacts among the Cheyenne, interviewing them in depth. The trust he developed with them allowed them to open up to him in a way they had not with any other outsiders. The result formed the bulk of Marquis' most important works.

== Early life ==
Marquis was born December 19, 1869, on a farm near Osceola, Missouri. The family surname, according to family tradition, came from French ancestors who had been granted the hereditary title of Marquis. Marquis' great-great-grandfather was disinherited around 1768 for marrying beneath his station, to the daughter of an English merchant. With no prospects in France, he emigrated to Virginia, where he took Marquis as a surname.

Marquis' grandfather, James Marquis, was a minister in the Methodist Church who left the ministry to study medicine. His son, Marquis' father, Adonijah Cosner Marquis, also studied medicine; both James and Adonijah served as medical officers in the Union Army during the American Civil War. Adonijah served at the military hospital in Clinton, Missouri, where he met and married Sarah Ellen Westfall, the eldest daughter of a wealthy farming family from Vernon County, Missouri, who became Marquis' mother. After the war, Adonijah purchased a farm in Osceola; he returned to medical practice and left the running of the farm to employees.

Marquis was the youngest of four children. His mother died before he was one year old. Although his father remarried soon after, Marquis was cared for by his maternal grandmother until he was four. He then joined his father and stepmother at their home in Roscoe, Missouri. Adonijah bought a half-share in the newspaper Osceola so that his son, Birney, Marquis' elder brother, could learn the printing trade. When he was old enough, Marquis did the same and could set type by the time he was thirteen. After leaving school in 1885, Marquis was sent, along with his sister Mollie, to the Weaubleau Christian Institute in Weaubleau, Missouri. He graduated in 1887.

At first, Marquis was only able to find work as a teacher at a local one-room school. However, his brother found him work as a printer in St. Joseph. In February 1888 Marquis made the 150-mile journey to St. Joseph. This was the farthest the young man had ever been from home and his first experience of a big city.

== Printworker ==
In St. Joseph Marquis worked for various newspapers, including the St. Joseph Daily News, the St. Joseph Gazette, and the St. Joseph Herald. It seems that work was easy to find as many printworkers had left the city after the printworkers union achieved a closed shop.

Marquis' interest in the West was first sparked in 1890 by stories from three fellow printers who had spent a year there. Marquis and a colleague at the Herald resolved to save for a similar trip, working every shift available. In the end, however, the other printer dropped out and Marquis went alone. He boarded a train for Helena, Montana, on July 23, 1890, arriving on the 27th. He soon found temporary work at the Helena Independent-Record. It was in Helena that Marquis first met Native Americans. Perhaps more remarkably, it was there that he first experienced a Chinese restaurant.

Later in 1890 Marquis traveled with another itinerant printer to Anaconda, Montana, where he again found temporary work with the Anaconda Standard. The Standard was the leading newspaper in Montana, financed by Marcus Daly, and built by campaigning editor John Hurst Durston. By the end of the year Marquis had a permanent post at the Standard. In November 1892, he married Octavia Stewart Hillhouse, a granddaughter of Joseph Stewart, the first commandant of Alcatraz. Two years later Marquis decided to change to a more settled career and began the study of medicine.

== Medicine ==
Marquis in 1916

In 1894, Marquis enrolled at University Medical College, Kansas City. A year of study was sufficient to allow him to practice medicine under the supervision of his father at Bosworth, Missouri, where the pair set up a practice and opened a drugstore. The practice was not very successful, so Marquis and his wife moved to Coloma where he worked under the supervision of another doctor. Marquis completed his studies with financial help from his wife's family and summer work as a printer in Anaconda. He graduated March 23, 1898, and returned to Montana. His daughter, Minnie-Ellen, was born soon after in Anaconda.

Still struggling financially, Marquis looked for a more prosperous practice in Virginia City, Montana, where he became friends with Samuel V. Stewart. He decided to set up practice in nearby Ennis, a town he expected would grow substantially. When the practice became successful, he moved his family to Ennis, and was able to pay off his debts. It was in Ennis that Marquis first took up writing after becoming friends with Robert A. Vickers, the founder of the Alder Gulch Times. Marquis was a correspondent for the paper, submitting news that he had gathered on his medical rounds. Finding that Ennis was not expanding as he had expected, in 1904 he moved to Bozeman, but the move was not a success, and he again got into debt. Here a second daughter was born, Anna Rose Octavia. He had more success with a move to Clyde Park, where he established a well-respected practice. By 1910 he could afford to build a larger home for his family and exchanged horse and buggy transport for motor vehicles on his rounds. He occasionally addressed the Montana Medical Association conventions and acted as the Park County Health Officer. Marquis continued to write newspaper articles while at Clyde Park, mainly on historical or biographical themes.

In 1915 Marquis' marriage began to fail. His family moved to Bozeman, leaving him without a receptionist, a role previously filled by his wife. At the same time, another practice had opened in Clyde Park, drawing away some of his business. In November 1916 Marquis closed his Clyde Park practice and moved to Livingston to share an office with the city health official.

== Law ==
Marquis was an avid reader, and at Clyde Park his material included law books borrowed from attorney friends. In 1916 they persuaded him to sit the bar exam, which he passed. However, Marquis never made professional use of this qualification except for one case where he represented a Methodist minister suing an employer (of a second job) for back wages. After winning the case, Marquis promptly retired from that career so that he could claim that he was "100 percent successful as a lawyer", but he remained listed as a member of the Montana bar throughout his life.

== Army Medical Corps ==
When the US entered World War I in 1917, Marquis volunteered for the Army Medical Corps. While at Fort Oglethorpe, Georgia, for training in August, Marquis took the opportunity to study the civil war site of the Battle of Chickamauga, in which his uncle, Birney Marquis, had fought with the 39th Indiana Infantry Regiment. This may be an early indication of Marquis' interest in writing books.

Marquis wished to be sent to France, but was required first to take a course in French. In the meantime, he was assigned to a convalescent hospital. Shortly before being sent overseas, Marquis was assigned to Camp Forrest in Lytle, Georgia, an engineering camp, where he found himself treating victims of the beginning of the 1918 flu pandemic. Marquis arrived in England just as the war ended; the flu epidemic, however, had not. He continued to Cannes, where he was assigned the task of determining the capacity of hotels for use as hospitals. In January 1919 he was assigned to the Hotel Metropole as assistant to the attending surgeon. They were soon overwhelmed with influenza cases. Marquis himself came down with flu but continued working. He was reassigned to the Hotel Suisse in Nice, but, still ill, was ordered back to the US. During the long wait for transport home, he took up medical duties in Gironde, finally docking in the US in June.

== Cheyenne agency physician ==
Following the end of his army service in 1919, Marquis was restless and unsure of his future path. He first restarted the practice at Livingston and sold the house at Clyde Park (retaining some land there as a legacy for his daughters). He then decided to move to Whitehall, where he spent more and more of his time writing, at first on his wartime experiences, and then short articles on diverse subjects collected into volumes. He also wrote short stories during this period. However, he could not find a publisher.

In early 1922 Marquis started considering working as an Indian agency physician. This would both satisfy his longstanding interest in the Native Americans of the West, and provide a subject that might be of interest to publishers. In May, Marquis applied to the Civil Service Commission. While waiting, he began work on a novel, Boute, an unfinished story based on his wartime experiences. In June, Marquis was appointed agency physician to the Northern Cheyenne. He arrived in the agency village of Lame Deer, Montana, in early July.

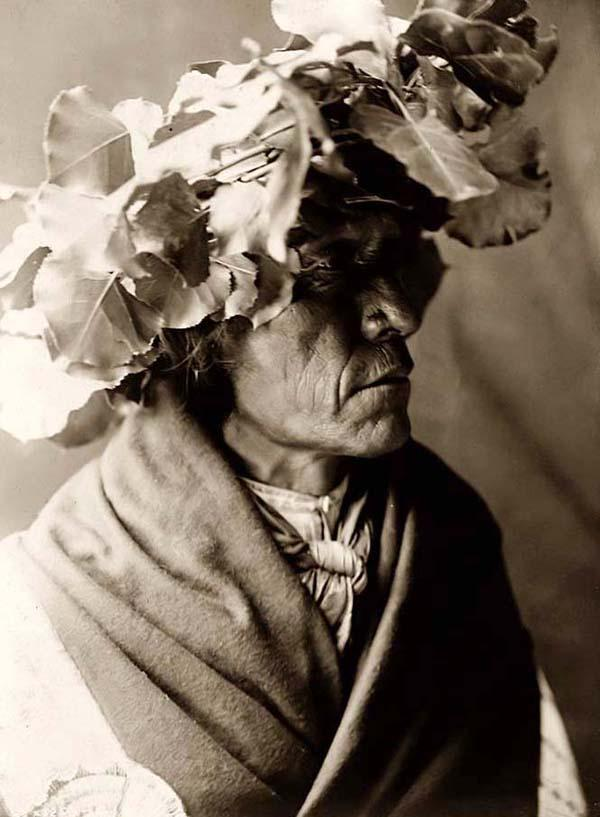
Porcupine in 1910

The Cheyennes at this time were poverty-stricken and in poor health. Tuberculosis was rife. Marquis was mistrusted at first, as was white-man medicine in general, but he showed sympathy and understanding for them and quickly gained their confidence. He began keeping an "Indian diary", a record of the stories told to him by the Cheyennes. He often required an interpreter for the older Cheyennes who could not speak English. Much of this material was incorporated into his later book The Cheyennes of Montana. Among the older people who spoke to Marquis was Porcupine, the preacher who brought the Ghost Dance religion to the Cheyenne. Another important informant was Willis Rowland, a mixed-blood, former army scout and interpreter. Rowland had been interpreter to George Bird Grinnell, author of The Cheyenne Indians: Their History and Ways of Life.

Marquis began taking photographs of Cheyenne life and people. Many of these images would be published long after Marquis' death by anthropologist Margot Liberty in A Northern Cheyenne Album. This habit of taking photos led to Marquis being given the Indian name "White Man Doctor Makes Pictures". However, Marquis found that he often had to explain the meaning to puzzled new Cheyenne acquaintances (Indian names were expected to have a self-evident meaning).

It was during this period that Marquis became interested in the Battle of the Little Bighorn and the death of Custer. This interest became an obsession that was to last the rest of his life. The battle site was only twenty-five miles to the west on the Crow Indian Reservation. All the participants of the battle on the US side had died in action, but very little had been published in the way of Indian accounts. Most information had come from soldiers who only witnessed the aftermath. Marquis realized that there were a number of Cheyenne participants of the battle still alive on the reservation. However, interviewing them at length seemed too difficult at this time. There was the language barrier, and Marquis was busy as a doctor trying to cover a large area.

As the particularly severe winter of 1922–23 started to close in, Marquis considered that the task had gone from difficult to impossible. He resigned his post and returned to Whitehall on September 27, having spent only ten weeks on the reservation. He arrived back in time to attend the wedding of his daughter Minnie-Ellen.

== Writing career ==
=== Crow agency physician ===
The cold winters drove Marquis to consider yet another change of career (Whitehall is at an elevation of 4360 ft); he applied to the United States Veteran's Bureau. Meanwhile, he continued writing. He expanded his Indian diary into a book on the Cheyenne; he also wrote short stories and an article on "Reviewing the Story of Custer's Last Battle", the first of his many publications on this subject. In April 1923, he moved to Alberton, where he continued to practice medicine, and published a short story "Buffalo Heart, Indian Policeman", printed in The Youth's Companion, a leading literary magazine. In June, this success, and the better climate in Alberton, led him to turn down a job offer from the Veteran's Bureau and put most of his effort into work on his Cheyenne book. In May 1924 he had a second story, "The Guest of the Tribe", published in The Youth's Companion. However, Marquis was never really comfortable writing fiction. What he really wanted to do was to write non-fiction about the Custer battle, and to do that he needed to be nearer to the scene. The opportunity came in June 1925 when the agency physician for the Crow Reservation suggested to him that there was room for another physician to set up practice there. In August, he set up a medical practice in Lodge Grass on the Crow Reservation.

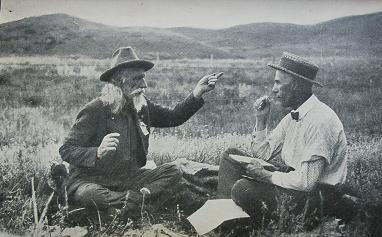
Leforge (left) and Marquis (right) in Indian Sign Language conversation

In early September Marquis went to Lame Deer for the Cheyenne annual fair. There, Willis Rowland helped him compile a list of elderly Cheyennes. Although the Custer battlefield was on the Crow Reservation, the Crow had been on the US side during the Great Sioux War of 1876, of which the Custer battle was a part, and so would have no eyewitnesses to the battle, everybody fighting with Custer having been killed. Back in Lodge Grass, Marquis made two important contacts. In November, he had his first meeting with Thomas H. Leforge. Leforge lived among the Crow and had been a scout and interpreter for General Gibbon in the 1876 war. Leforge would be the subject of the first book Marquis succeeded in publishing, Memoirs of a White Crow Indian. The second contact was William H. White, who was with the Second Cavalry under Gibbon. White would be the subject of Custer, Cavalry & Crows.

Marquis was now having some publishing success, including fiction in Lariat Story Magazine, non-fiction in Century Magazine (an article about Oscar Good Shot, an Oglala Sioux), and his first work of fiction not related to Indians, "The making of a garage doctor" in The American Motorist. However, he was clearly still torn concerning his future. The importance of Leforge and White to his writing career was not yet clear, and Marquis continued to look at other options. Besides his application to the Veteran's Bureau, he also looked for a post as agency physician (he was still practicing privately). Unable to get a post on the Crow reservation, he applied for a post with the Western Shoshone in Nevada. He changed his mind after some writing success and declined the post when it was offered, only to change his mind again and request the post. However, it was no longer available.

=== Indian Sign Language ===
Marquis was taught Indian Sign Language by the Crow. This would be a great help to him in his research as the language was common to all the plains tribes. Marquis also had lessons from John Stands in Timber, the Cheyenne tribal historian and grandson of Lame White Man, a Cheyenne chief killed in the battle with Custer. Together with co-author Margot Liberty, Stands in Timber published Cheyenne Memories shortly before he died in 1967.

According to the Crow historian Joseph Medicine Crow, whose family were close friends of Marquis, Marquis would engage in animated sign language with Leforge while driving. This once caused an accident when Marquis rear-ended another vehicle while so distracted.

== Back to the Cheyenne ==
In July 1926, a large payment from Century allowed him to move to Ashland, close to the Northern Cheyenne reservation. Marquis once again applied for a position at the Western Shoshone reservation, but when this was turned down in October he wrote, "rather glad than sorry to hear it", as his writing had progressed a great deal in the interim. He had met the father of Kate Big Head, a witness to the Custer battle about whom he would later write. Another new contact was Jules Chaudel, who had been with the Cheyenne scouts at Fort Keogh. In October, Marquis completed Memoirs of a White Crow Indian and submitted it to The Century Company. He then began working through Rowland's list of Cheyenne old enough to be informants about the Custer fight. His first meeting was with Iron Teeth, said to be the oldest woman in the tribe. Next was Wooden Leg, a government-appointed tribal judge and another ex-scout. Wooden Leg had fought with the Cheyenne at the Battle of the Little Big Horn at the age of 18. In November, Marquis met James Tangled Yellow Hair.

By January 1927, Marquis was working this material into a book that would eventually become The Cheyennes of Montana. There were to be chapters on Chaudel, Iron Teeth, Wooden Leg, and Tangled Yellow Hair. However, Marquis developed a particularly strong relationship with Wooden Leg, whose lengthy narrative eventually became a separate book, A Warrior Who Fought Custer. Also covered separately was Kate Big Head's narrative, published as She Watched Custer's Last Battle. Another narrative included in The Cheyennes is, "A Cheyenne Old Man". Though the man was not named by Marquis, a photograph of him was included in the book, and he was subsequently identified as Sun Bear, a veteran of both the Fetterman Fight and the Custer battle.

From April, Marquis began collecting artifacts of the Custer battle. He visited Cheyennes to buy objects that had been taken from the dead soldiers, particularly weapons. According to Weist, the fact that the Cheyennes would even admit that they had these objects was a measure of the trust Marquis had earned. Marquis also collected Cheyenne objects, including scalping knives. After attending the annual Sun Dance in Lame Deer, Marquis moved to Hardin, somewhat closer to the Custer battlefield. Marquis' presence at that Sun Dance, and at others held in subsequent years until 1931, was another measure of the Cheyennes' trust. The Sun Dance (called by the Cheyenne the Great Medicine dance) had earlier been made illegal by the Federal Government; 1927 was the first year they had been allowed to hold it openly. It was still disapproved of, and practicing Indian medicine was a jailable offense.

== Hardin ==
In October 1927, Memoirs of a White Crow Indian was accepted for publication by Century, and Marquis was prompted to take down his medical practice sign. However, this was premature, as it would be some time before royalties were forthcoming. Lack of funds drove Marquis to continue seeing patients and carrying out insurance medical examinations. He also needed to borrow money from relatives and cash in his war risk insurance policy. Memoirs of a White Crow Indian was published in April 1928 and received good reviews.

The Cheyennes of Montana was submitted to Century in August, and A Warrior Who Fought Custer was submitted in October. However, in November Marquis was informed that the first six months' sales of Memoirs of a White Crow Indian had been poor, and the royalties were disappointing. There was now a danger that the other two books he had submitted to Century would not be published at all. A small success came in December with the publication of "Red Ripe's Squaw" in Century Magazine, it was an abridged version of the Iron Teeth narrative. At the end of February 1929 Marquis received a much-needed payment of $150 for this work.

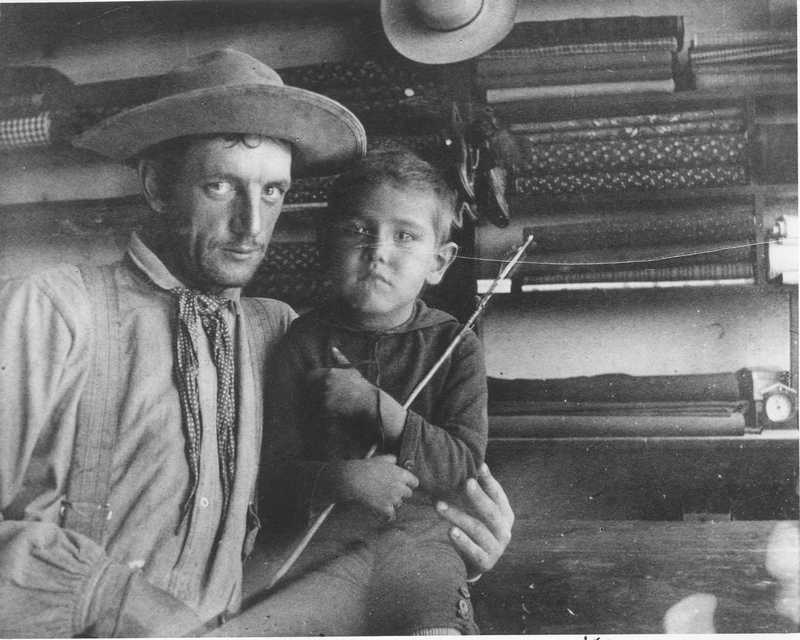
James Willard Schultz and his son Lone Wolf, 1884

In the meantime, Marquis was spending a great deal of time on his research into the Custer battle. He now had a dozen Cheyenne informants, including Wooden Leg. With them, from June 1928, communicating mainly with sign language or through interpreters, he consulted maps and went on field trips to the battle site. He also corresponded with George Bird Grinnell, Generals Hugh L. Scott and Edward S. Godfrey, and with Custer's widow Elizabeth Custer. He also started loaning out some of his Custer memorabilia for exhibitions. Personal contacts during this period included Laton Alton Huffman, a well-known Montana frontier photographer, W. H. Banfill of the Billings Gazette, who wrote Western history articles, artist and author Will James, and James Willard Schultz, author and explorer.

In June 1929 Marquis was putting together a new book about William H. White, Custer, Cavalry & Crows, which involved more interviews. He found a publisher in April 1930, the Midwest Company of Minneapolis, but the publication date was not until spring, 1931, and Marquis would not receive royalties until a year after publication, so money continued to be tight. Upset, Marquis retired to a cabin in Laurel. Better news came in August 1930. The Midwest Company accepted A Warrior Who Fought Custer for publication. They wished to publish it in the spring instead of Custer, Cavalry & Crows, whose publication would be delayed until a later date. Although the latter was now delayed for a second time, both books were certain to be published. In the meantime, Marquis, perpetually short of funds, moved to a small cabin on the property of his brother, Addie Marquis, in Bozeman. Here he spent some of his time setting type at a printing shop that employed his cousin, Nige Garrison, to whom he owed money.

A Warrior Who Fought Custer was published in April 1931 to mostly good reviews. However, W. J. Ghent, writing in The New York Times, criticized the claim made by Wooden Leg that many of Custer's men had committed suicide rather than face death at the hands of the Indians. Although sales of the Wooden Leg book did well, better than Marquis had expected, this controversy was to prove a hindrance to his chances of future book publications. Marquis believed he had multiple Indian sources verifying this account, and there were no surviving whites to contradict it. He planned to develop the idea more fully in a future book, eventually to become Keep the Last Bullet for Yourself.

Marquis' publications during 1932 were articles published in the Billings Gazette, starting with an article on Leforge. Marquis submitted around 50 articles about the American West, with a particular emphasis on Indians and the Custer battle. Most of these articles were reworked, previously unpublished drafts. The articles were later syndicated by the Montana Newspaper Association. After the death of Banfill in August 1933, Marquis' articles became a regular feature to fill that gap.

== Custer museum ==
Marquis continued to display and loan out his Custer artifacts. He had been considering for some time making more permanent arrangements for his collection of objects and photographs. In July 1932, with the aid of a loan from his younger daughter, Octavia, he came to an arrangement with the manager of a Custer tourist camp in Hardin. Marquis was given a two-room cabin; he lived in one room, and the other was used to display the collection. The camp planned to build a gift shop and Marquis' museum was expected to attract customers to it.

In March 1933, Marquis claimed squatter's right on a nearby piece of land. He opened his Custer Battle Museum in April and moved to the property. He began publishing his own pamphlets for sale at the museum and the Custer battlefield. Titles in 1933 were: Sketch Story of the Custer Battle, She Watched Custer's Last Battle, Custer Soldiers Not Buried, and Which Indian Killed Custer?, in 1934 Sitting Bull and Gall the Warrior, and in 1935 Two Days After the Custer Battle.

== Last book ==
In December 1933, Marquis began his last book, Keep the Last Bullet for Yourself: The True Story of Custer's Last Stand. Marquis considered this his most important work – the subject was his central interest and he regarded much of his previous work as mere preparation for it. The book was completed in March 1934. However, his publisher, the Midwest Company, went out of business shortly afterwards.

In November, Marquis realized that he had a heart problem but continued to work. In January 1935, he wrote a new chapter for his still-unpublished book The Cheyennes of Montana, titled "Custer Battle Cheyennes". In addition to this and his new book, he was still looking for a publisher for Custer, Cavalry & Crows. On March 22, while recovering from influenza, he died of a heart attack. He was buried at the Custer Battlefield National Cemetery with a military funeral.

== Legacy ==
=== Value to scholars ===
Marquis' body of work is of value to scholars researching the Plains Indians' way of life in general, especially the Cheyennes, and the Custer fight at Little Bighorn. Marquis was himself aware of this importance: in a letter to his daughters shortly before his death, he emphasizes that he was the only person recording the stories of the only eyewitnesses to the Custer battle:

It has been my fortune to have obtained stories from the very-last survivors of that time, and to have obtained relics of it. And the time has almost passed when anybody else can have this opportunity. I do not know of anyone else who is making any special effort to do this, so it appears mine is going to be practically a monopoly in that matter through all future time.

— Thomas B. Marquis

His biographer, Thomas D. Weist, agrees, saying that even after his books had gone out of print, "anthropologists, historians, and avid readers of western history continued to seek them out in libraries for their myriad details on the Cheyennes, the Crows, and the Battle of the Little Bighorn." Edgar I. Stewart says Marquis is "one of the ablest students of the American Indian". Liberty says that he is "well trusted generally, as a historian ..." She singles out his final piece of work, the "Custer Battlefield Cheyennes", as being of special interest to American Indian Wars scholars. It is not just the Custer fight; Marquis is also known for recording the earlier life on the plains of the Cheyenne and stories of survivors of the later Northern Cheyenne Exodus.

Such praise can also be found in the remarks of those critical of Marquis' suicide theory. Richard G. Hardorff wrote in 1994: "Be that as it may, it is beyond doubt that the contributions made by Marquis to our historical knowledge far outweigh these possible shortcomings." Even Ghent's highly critical review of the Wooden Leg book concedes that it is "a deeply interesting story", with his criticism reserved for the description of the Custer fight only.

By 1945, all of Marquis' works were out of print. However, the Wooden Leg narrative was reprinted as Wooden Leg: A Warrior Who Fought Custer in 1962 by the University of Nebraska Press. In 1967 Marquis' daughters published his collected pamphlets as Custer on the Little Bighorn. Part of his Cheyenne book was published as The Reminiscences of Four Indians and a White Soldier in 1973, and Memoirs of a White Crow Indian was reprinted in 1974.

Marquis' unpublished books also eventually came into print; Custer, Cavalry & Crows in 1975, Keep the Last Bullet for Yourself: The True Story of Custer's Last Stand in 1976, and The Cheyennes of Montana in 1978, 43 years after his death. The last of these included an introduction and 26-page biography of Marquis by Thomas D. Weist. Weist remains the main source of published information on Marquis. In 2003 a new edition of Wooden Leg: A Warrior Who Fought Custer was published with an introduction by Richard Littlebear, Cheyenne writer, educator, and president of Chief Dull Knife College.

The value of Marquis' work was properly recognized only after his death. Liberty and others believe that it took so long to publish much of his work because of his controversial theory on the suicide of Custer's men. Historian Brian Dippie suggests that the Great Depression may also have been a contributing factor.

=== Preserving Marquis' collection ===
Shortly before his death, Marquis urged his daughters, Octavia and Minnie-Ellen, to try and preserve his Custer museum collection. They donated most of the collection to the US Government, and it is now part of the permanent display at the visitor center of the Little Bighorn Battlefield National Monument.

Some of Marquis' photographs appeared in his books, but most remained unpublished. Marquis' daughters gave the negatives (about five hundred of them) to John Woodenlegs. Woodenlegs was the grandson of Wooden Leg, the subject of Marquis' book A Warrior Who Fought Custer. He was an educator, tribal president from 1955 to 1968, and founder of Chief Dull Knife College.

Woodenlegs, unsure what to do with the material, passed them to Weist, who at the time was writing a Cheyenne history for use in reservation schools. The negatives were contained in a battered shoebox, and some were in poor condition. Weist involved photographer Jerry Mader to work on their restoration. Weist, Mader, and Woodenlegs began a project in the 1960s to make the images available in reservation schools. Without funds for publication, however, the project was abandoned in 1981 on the death of Woodenlegs. Weist died in 1994. The negatives were passed to anthropologist Margot Liberty in 1998 by a remaining project member, Elizabeth Wilson Clark, shortly before her death. Liberty had been a teacher at the Northern Cheyenne reservation in the 1950s, and she agreed to edit the material into a book for the University of Oklahoma Press. Finally, 142 of the images were published in 2006 as A Northern Cheyenne Album. The book includes a commentary from Woodenlegs recorded years before.

The negatives were sold by Hap Gilliland of the Council for Indian Education to the Buffalo Bill Historical Center museum in Cody, Wyoming. Mader complained that the negatives had been a gift to the Cheyenne people, and that their proper home was in the John Woodenlegs Memorial Library in Lame Deer on the Northern Cheyenne Reservation. The Smithsonian Institution and The Little Bighorn National Monument museum hold a few other Marquis negatives.

The photographs are not of uniformly good quality. Dippie says that some are "... at first glance, seemingly candidates for the discard pile". But he goes on to say that their true value is in their depiction of everyday Cheyenne life in the reservation period in ways that posed portraits do not. On the other hand, Dippie adds, there are some "that would rival the best efforts of a studio portraitist". He concludes by saying that "[a]nyone interested in Plains Indian history will want to own [the book]".

Liberty says that on first being sent the photographs it "was clear that they were of great historical value". For instance, there are pictures of veteran fighters in old age, the remnants from before the surrender of the Cheyenne. There are also images of the Sun Dance and the Animal Dance. The latter no longer exists, and photography is now prohibited at the former.

=== Suicide controversy ===
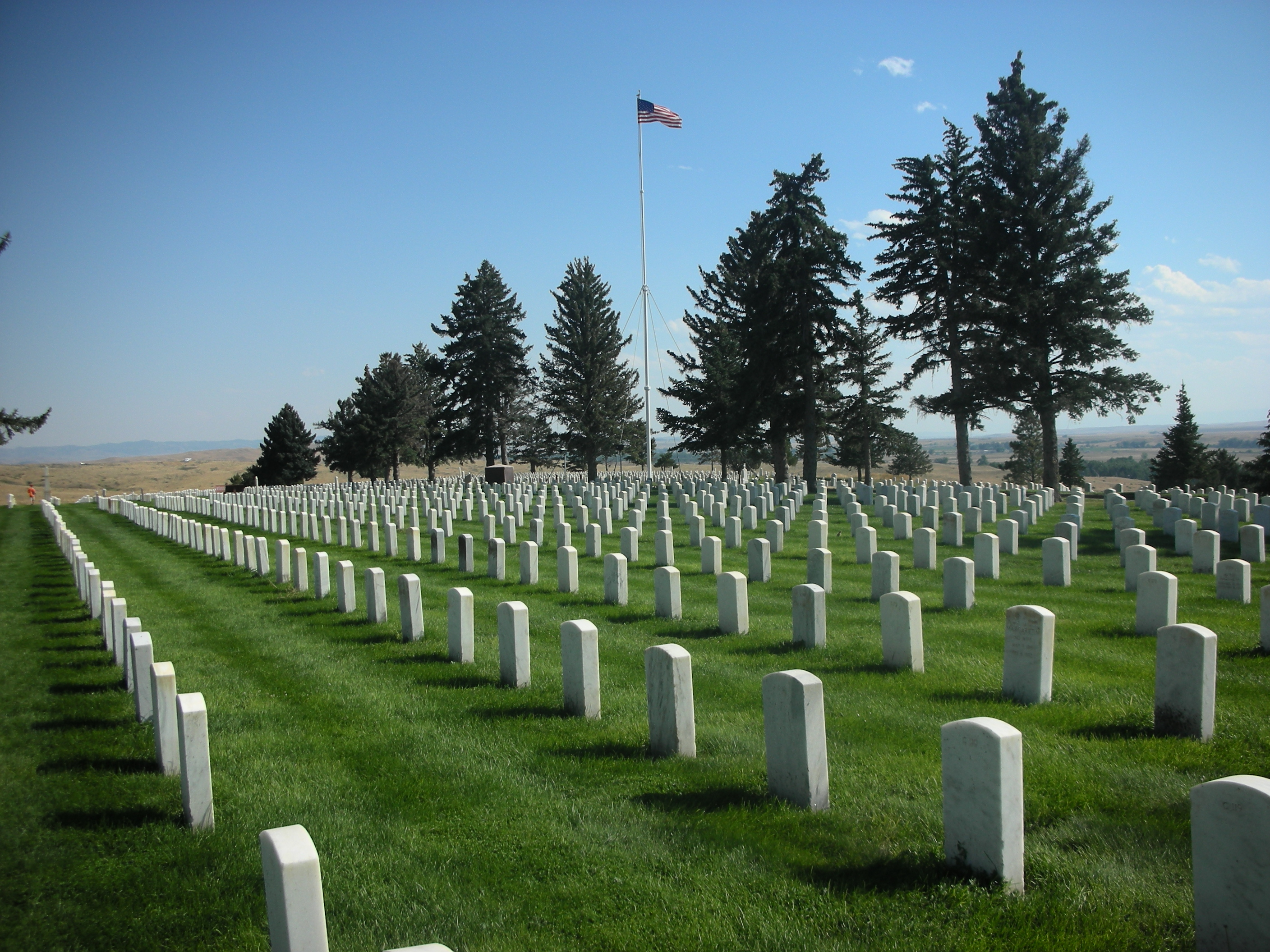
Grave markers at Little Bighorn Battlefield National Monument

The theory that Custer's soldiers committed suicide en masse toward the end of the Battle of the Little Bighorn has been controversial from the moment it was first suggested, and the discussion continues. The notion was so controversial that Marquis could not find a publisher for Keep the Last Bullet for Yourself, his main vehicle for promoting the theory, and the book did not appear in print until 1976, forty years after his death.

The earliest criticism comes with Ghent's review in The New York Times of the Wooden Leg book after its first publication in 1931. "No student of the battle is likely to accept any of the new revelations." Ghent is dismissive of the value of Indians as eyewitnesses: "... he tells what he remembers, along with much that he has imagined ..." and insists that the "body of authenticated fact is in no danger of being disturbed by any new material from any source". Weist describes this review as "somewhat supercilious" and goes on to point out that Marquis has many other witnesses confirming the story, and that the only eyewitnesses are Indians. Marquis names a dozen of these in the introduction to the Wooden Leg book, one of whom, Sun Bear, gives a similar account in The Cheyennes of Montana. However, Marquis has many other critics who say he either exaggerated the role played by suicide or is entirely mistaken.

Ghent's mistrust of Indians as reliable witnesses was commonplace in the period;

But I did not say anything about that. Other Indians, at other times, had tried to tell of the soldiers killing themselves, but the white people listening always became angry and said the Indians were liars, so I thought it best to keep quiet.

— Wooden Leg

According to Hardorff, the theory is discounted by most academics. He suggests that Marquis may have made errors due to the use of sign language, which, he claims, cannot convey the nuances of language. In his book, Wooden Leg unambiguously relates a tale of mass suicide. He discusses possible causes of the suicides at length. It puzzled him because the idea of suicide to avoid capture was unknown to the Indians. Attributing the soldier's suicides to the effects of whisky was a common theory among the Indians, although Wooden Leg believed the prayers of medicine men to have been the cause. Wooden Leg's only taste of whisky up to the time of the battle had been a mouthful – which he immediately spat out – that he took from a captured bottle. In later life, Wooden Leg changed his mind and subscribed to the whisky theory after experiencing the effects of alcohol first-hand.

Richard Fox and others note that while Wooden Leg's version is corroborated by the oral tradition of other Cheyenne witnesses, notably that of Kate Big Head, a young woman who witnessed the battle, there is no corroboration in the oral tradition of the Sioux. Fox concludes that "quite simply, the contention is nonsense. A few troopers undoubtedly took their own lives, but it is hard to know what factors fostered the idea of wholesale suicide". Fox in his turn has been criticized for selectively using Indian oral tradition when it suits him, but discarding it as nonsense when he finds it disagreeable.

According to Liberty, the soldiers' fear that Indians would torture prisoners was unfounded. "Plains Indian warriors as a rule took as captives only women and children, killing male opponents outright." However, Liberty goes on to say that the possibility of torture was widely believed by Custer's men. She says that Keep the Last Bullet for Yourself is well researched by Marquis, but is often not consulted merely because of the title.

Another suggestion is that the Cheyenne warriors, pressed to recount details of the Custer battle, were still reluctant to admit to killing soldiers for fear of punishment. A simple way out of this dilemma was to say when questioned by non-Indians that most of the soldiers died at their own hands. Researchers Fox and Thom Hatch say that Wooden Leg retracted the claim in later life; this would have been in extreme old age, as he had still not recanted at the age of 73 when the book was written, other than to say it was whisky that was the cause rather than prayer. In his book Cheyenne Memories, John Stands In Timber, tribal historian for the Northern Cheyenne, agrees: "Wooden Leg said some other things (in his book) he took back later. One was that the soldiers were drunk, and many killed themselves. I went with two army men to see him one time. They wanted to find out about it. I interpreted ... and we asked him if it were true that the Indians said the soldiers did that. He laughed and said there were just too many Indians. The soldiers did their best. He said if they had been drunk they would not have killed as many as they did. But it was in the book."

Archaeologists have attempted to test the suicide theory, particularly by the examination of the remains of skulls, but have been unable to reach a conclusion. The suicide theory cannot be ruled out by the archaeological evidence, but there is no evidence to support it, either.

=== Other controversies ===
Another of Ghent's criticisms of the Wooden Leg narrative concerns the manner of the death of Tom Custer, brother of Colonel Custer, at the Battle of the Little Big Horn. Ghent's reasons for disbelieving are not made clear, other than that the source is an Indian. Wooden Leg describes a decapitated body with "paint markings" in the skin. From the detailed description of these tattoos, and the buckskin clothing, Marquis identifies the body as Tom Custer. This criticism does not seem to have been taken up by other scholars. Tom Custer's biography describes the decapitation and the identification from tattoos as facts without further comment. Liberty discusses the controversies surrounding Marquis in great detail, but fails to even mention Tom Custer.

Liberty lists a number of Marquis' claims about the Cheyenne that are either doubted or are just generally little known. First among these is that the Sioux believed, according to Marquis, that the Great Sioux War of 1876 was a war against the Cheyenne by the United States. The US certainly thought they were mainly fighting the Sioux, and the conventional view of historians is that the Sioux were central to the action. Without doubt, the Sioux had the greatest number of participants on the Indian side, but, according to Marquis, they thought they were merely coming to the aid of their allies the Cheyenne. Liberty points out that the Sioux would have had some justification in this belief; the number of Cheyenne villages destroyed far exceeded the number of Sioux villages, even though the Cheyenne were fewer in number. Liberty includes this idea within her overall concept of "Cheyenne Primacy" – that the Cheyennes were the most important group in the historical development of the Northern Plains.

According to Liberty, the Marquis idea most likely to be disbelieved is his claim that the Northern Cheyennes held a conference with their bitter enemies, the Crows, in July 1875 to discuss territorial borders. However, Liberty thinks that even this idea is worthy of further consideration, and offers other evidence of a slow thaw in Cheyenne–Crow relations. Of the controversial ideas concerning the Cheyenne as a whole, Liberty concludes that,

Either Marquis in these works abandoned the research capacities which made his early work so useful to scholars, or he was saying things which have been unjustly disregarded for nearly 70 years.

— Margot Liberty

== Selected works ==
- (with Thomas H. Leforge) Memoirs of a White Crow Indian, Century, 1928 OCLC 562420084; University of Nebraska Press, 1974 OCLC 874127
- (with Wooden Leg) A Warrior who Fought Custer, Midwest, 1931 OCLC 562420102; University of Nebraska Press, 1962 OCLC 633159088 and with a new introduction as Wooden Leg: A Warrior Who Fought Custer, 2003 ISBN 0-8032-8288-5
- Custer on the Little Bighorn, J. L. Hastings, 1967 OCLC 1093080
- (with William H. White) Custer, Cavalry & Crows, Old Army Press, 1975 OCLC 2332471
- Keep the Last Bullet for Yourself: The True Story of Custer's Last Stand, Reference Publications, 1976 OCLC 786209093; Two Continents, 1976 OCLC 1991100
- The Cheyennes of Montana, Reference Publications, 1978 OCLC 4210988

== Bibliography ==
- Crowell, Benedict; Wilson, Robert Forrest, The Road to France I. The Transportation of Troops and Military Supplies 1917–1918, Yale University Press, 1921 OCLC 18696066.
- Day, Carl F., Tom Custer: Ride to Glory, University of Oklahoma Press, 2005 ISBN 0-8061-3687-1.
- Dippie, Brian W., "Review: A Northern Cheyenne Album: Photographs by Thomas B. Marquis", American Indian Culture and Research Journal, vol. 31, no. 2, pp. 138–140, 2007.
- Elliott, Michael A., Custerology: The Enduring Legacy of the Indian Wars and George Armstrong Custer, University of Chicago Press, 2008 ISBN 0-226-20147-3.
- Fox, Everall, "Indian education for all: A tribal college perspective", The Phi Delta Kappan, vol. 88, no. 3, pp. 208–212, November 2006.
- Fox, Richard A., Archaeology, History, and Custer's Last Battle: The Little Big Horn Reexamined, University of Oklahoma Press, 2003 ISBN 0-8061-2998-0.
- Ghent, W. J., "Custer's fight on the Little Big Horn River", The New York Times Book Review, May 24, 1931, p. BR7 (subscription required).
- Hardorff, Richard G., Cheyenne Memories of the Custer Fight, University of Nebraska Press, 1998 ISBN 0-8032-7311-8.
- Hatch, Thom, Custer and the Battle of the Little Bighorn: an Encyclopedia of the People, Places, Events, Indian Culture and Customs, Information Sources, Art and Films, McFarland & Co., 1997 ISBN 0-7864-0154-0.
- Leiker, James N.; Powers, Ramon, The Northern Cheyenne Exodus in History and Memory, University of Oklahoma Press, 2012 ISBN 0-8061-8590-2.
- Liberty, Margot, "Cheyenne primacy: the tribes' perspective as opposed to that of the United States Army", Friends of the Little Bighorn Battlefield, November 2006, retrieved and archived 10 October 2015.
- Liberty, Margot (ed); Marquis, Thomas B.; Woodenlegs, John, A Northern Cheyenne Album: Photographs of Thomas B. Marquis, University of Oklahoma Press, 2006, ISBN 0-8061-3749-5.
- Mader, Jerry, The Road to Lame Deer, University of Nebraska Press, 2002 ISBN 0-8032-3103-2.
- Mader, Jerry, "Book review: A Northern Cheyenne Album", Great Plains Quarterly, 1 October 2007
- Marquis, Thomas B., The Cheyennes of Montana, Reference Publications, 1978, ISBN 0-917256-09-3
- Marquis, Thomas B.; Wooden Leg, Wooden Leg: A Warrior Who Fought Custer, University of Nebraska Press, 2003 ISBN 0-8032-8288-5.
- Reece, Bob; Liberty, Margot, "interview: Dr. Margot Liberty", Friends of the Little Bighorn Battlefield, October 2006, retrieved and archived 11 November 2015.
- Scott, Douglas D., Archaeological Perspectives on the Battle of the Little Bighorn, University of Oklahoma Press, 2000 ISBN 0-8061-3292-2.
- Stands In Timber, John; Liberty, Margot, Cheyenne Memories, Yale University Press, 1998 ISBN 0-300-07300-3.
- Stewart, Edgar Irving, Custer's Luck, University of Oklahoma Press, 1955 ISBN 0-8061-1632-3.
- Swibold, Dennis L., Copper Chorus: Mining, Politics, and the Montana Press, 1889–1959, Montana Historical Society, 2006 ISBN 0-9759196-0-1.
- Weist, Thomas D., "Thomas B. Marquis", in Marquis, Thomas B., The Cheyennes of Montana, pp. 23–48, Reference Publications, 1978 ISBN 0-917256-04-2.
- Wooden Leg, see "Marquis"
