= Sansarc Creek =

Stream in South Dakota, US

Coordinates: 44°43′54″N 100°59′17″W

Sansarc Creek is a stream in the U.S. state of South Dakota.

The stream was named for the Sansarc Sioux Indians.

== See also ==
- List of rivers of South Dakota
