= Wooden Leg =

Northern Cheyenne warrior

- Kâhamâxéveóhtáhe

Personal details
- Born: c. 1858 In the Black Hills, near the Cheyenne River
- Died: 1940 (~82 years old)
- Relations: Elder brothers: Strong Wind Blowing and Yellow Hair, younger brother: Twin), elder sister: Crooked Nose, younger sister: Fingers Woman).
- Parent(s): Many Bullet Wounds (also called White Buffalo Shaking off the Dust) and Eagle Feather on the Forehead
- Known for: Fought at the Battle of Little Bighorn; also known for walking long distances
- Nickname: Eats from His Hand

Wooden Leg (Cheyenne Kâhamâxéveóhtáhe) (c. 1858–1940) was a Northern Cheyenne warrior who fought against Custer at the Battle of the Little Big Horn.

== Early life ==
Wooden Leg was born, in about 1858, in the region of the Black Hills, near the Cheyenne River. He was son of Many Bullet Wounds (also called White Buffalo Shaking off the Dust) and Eagle Feather on the Forehead. He had three brothers (the two elder ones being Strong Wind Blowing and Yellow Hair, the younger one Twin) and two sisters (the elder one being Crooked Nose, the younger one Fingers Woman).

During his childhood, he was known as Eats from His Hand. Later, he inherited the name Wooden Leg from his uncle, a Crow adopted by the family of Eagle Feather on the Forehead. This young Crow proved to be a tireless walker, outlasting all the young Cheyenne and earning the name Wooden Leg, since his tireless legs seemed to be made of wood. Only his nephew was able to follow him during his endless walks, so the friends of Eats from His Hand began calling him by his uncle's name in sport. Eventually, Eats from His Hand took his uncle's name as his own.

In his childhood and youth, he lived among his tribe, wandering in the land between the Black Hills and the Little Bighorn River. During this period, he lived like any other Indian of the Plains, spending his time hunting game and fighting against the enemy tribes, in particular Crow and Shoshone. Wooden Leg was known for his gargantuan height and was measured 6 ft 3 in (191 cm) tall in his 70s.

The first remarkable battle with the white men he saw was the Wagon Box Fight in 1866. Wooden Leg was too young to take part in the battle, but during the fight, his eldest brother Strong Wind Blowing died. So, in spite of the final victory of the Cheyenne, that was a mourning day for all his family. At 14, he was invited by Left Hand Shooter to become part of the warrior society of the Elkhorn Scrapers, one of the three warrior societies (the other being the group of the Crazy Dog and the group of the Fox) in which the men of the tribe were divided. At 17, he went on retreat to thank the Great Spirit. He spent four days closed in a tepee, meditating and contemplating, visited only once a day. After the trial, his face was painted with a black circle enclosing his forehead, chin, and cheeks; the internal area of the circle was yellow. This facial picture, together with his best suit, his shield, and his flute made from the wing bone of an eagle, became part of his war equipment for the rest of his life

== Great Sioux War of 1876–1877 ==
On the morning of March 17, 1876, Wooden Leg and a few hundred Northern Cheyenne and Oglala Sioux people were peacefully encamped along the banks of the frozen Powder River near present-day Moorhead, Montana. Around 9:05 am, U.S. soldiers under the command of Colonel Joseph J. Reynolds came charging into the sleeping village. Wooden Leg and other warriors were quick to act, moving the women and children out of harm's way, and slowing the soldiers' advance. Reynold's cavalrymen burned the village and the Cheyenne's winter food supply, and also captured about 700 of the Cheyenne's horses, but were forced to retreat to the south when the warriors counterattacked. This became known as the Battle of Powder River. The Cheyenne recaptured most of their horses from the soldiers the next morning, and suffered surprisingly few casualties, but in the words of one Cheyenne, were "rendered very poor." The men, women, and children walked three days to reach the Oglala Sioux village of Crazy Horse farther north on the Powder River, where they were given shelter and food. On the way, several of the Cheyenne froze to death.

On June 17, 1876, Wooden Leg participated in the Battle of the Rosebud, against Brigadier General George Crook's force of 1,000 U.S. cavalrymen and infantrymen who were allied with 300 Crow and Shoshone warriors. Five of the six U.S. cavalry companies that had fought Wooden Leg's village exactly three months earlier on the Powder River were present at the Rosebud, but Colonel Reynolds had been court martialed and forced to resign, so was not present. The battle, which was a strategic Native American victory, contributed to Custer's subsequent defeat at the Battle of the Little Bighorn, eight days later.

On the morning of the June 25, 1876, while sleeping under a tree after a feasting night, Wooden Leg and his brother Yellow Hair were awakened by the cries of the old men claiming the arrival of U.S. soldiers. Wooden Leg ran to his tent. He quickly prepared himself for the battle, then moved himself to the melee with his brother. At first, he fought with soldiers under Major Marcus Reno hidden and surrounded in the woods near the river. Defeating these enemies, he went towards the river, where he found a rifle and ammunition. Then, he attacked the soldiers on the hills, under the command of General George A. Custer. Wooden Leg had just fought in the Battle of Little Bighorn, one of the bloodiest battles of the American Indian Wars.

After the victorious battle, the Northern Cheyenne wandered for some time in the region of the Little Bighorn River. In late 1876, General Crook led another force out of Cantonment Reno, a staging area, and north up the Powder River. Crook's Indian Scouts, Pawnee, Sioux, Shoshone and others found a large Cheyenne encampment at the Red Fork of the Powder River, on the east side of the Big Horn Mountains. Mackenzie's raiders, (the 4th U.S. Cavalry) were dispatched to attack and destroy the camp. After a long and difficult overnight march over icy and treacherous terrain, the 4th came upon the camp of Morning Star (Dull Knife) in the early morning of November 25, 1876. The Cheyenne had been dancing most of the night and most of the camp was awake, rather than asleep as some accounts indicate. Colonel Ranald S. Mackenzie's troops and scouts attacked the camp, killing many of the inhabitants, and driving off the rest, including Wooden Leg and Little Wolf. The camp itself was burned and the food provisions were taken by the scouts and troops. Because of the flight, Wooden Leg was forced to abandon his flute, which was destroyed in the destruction of the camp.

After the battle, the Northern Cheyenne marched towards northeast, reaching the Oglala Sioux. Here they were joined by other tribes, such as Miniconjou, Sans Arcs, Santee Sioux, and Blackfeet. Together, they reached, and camped in, the valley of the Little Bighorn, then moved to the Tongue River. They were soon chased by more U.S. soldiers under Colonel Nelson A. Miles, who fought them at the Battle of Wolf Mountain on January 8, 1877.

== Later life ==
Some Cheyennes, who had lived for some time in the reservations of the United States, were sent by the U.S. government to persuade the tribes to surrender and to live in a reservation. Because of their hunger, a great part of the Cheyenne tribe accepted the offer; Wooden Leg, with a group of 34 other Cheyennes, among whom was his brother Yellow Hair, refused, since his fellows and he "still desired, more than anything, that freedom that they considered a right". He lived a laborious life in the area of the Tongue and Powder Rivers, until again because of hunger, he and the other 30 Cheyennes decided to give up their lives as hunters and sought the reservation.

Wooden Leg entered the White River Reservation. He lived there until the U.S. government forced the Cheyennes to Indian Territory (present-day Oklahoma). There, Wooden Leg learned how to hunt eagles. However, the new reservation was very far from the native land of many Northern Cheyennes, and many died of disease. A group led by Dull Knife and Little Wolf disobeyed the soldiers and left the reservation to return north. Wooden Leg at first refused to follow the leaders, and remained on the reservation. In 1878, he married a Southern Cheyenne woman. After the death of his father, Wooden Leg and his family decided to leave the southern reservation. Passing from the White River reservation, renamed by that time as Pine Ridge Indian Reservation, they reached the place where Little Wolf and the other Cheyennes camped. It was the core of the Tongue River.

In 1889, Wooden Leg enlisted at Fort Keogh as a U.S. Indian scout, and was assigned to First Lieutenant Edward W. Casey's Cheyenne Scouts of the Department of Dakota. In 1890, Casey's Scouts and Wooden Leg guided soldiers in the Ghost Dance campaign resulting in the Wounded Knee Massacre. In the same years, he served also as a messenger and a sentry.

Thirty years after the battle of Little Bighorn, he took part in a 1906 meeting of whites and Indians, gathered on the field of the battle to remember that event. He spoke of the battle, being one of the few Indians who had the courage to tell his experience to Dixon, a white doctor.

Wooden Leg was baptized by the priest in the reservation in 1908. He thought that the whites and the Indians worshiped the same god, even if in a different manner (i.e.: calling him with different names).

Wooden Leg, together with the young Little Wolf (nephew of the old Cheyenne leader), Two Moons and Black Wolf, was part of a 1913 delegation sent to Washington to speak about the Cheyenne tribe. During this journey, he visited Washington and New York. Back in the reservation, he became a judge: he had the responsibility to solve quarrels in the tribe and to teach the law of the United States. Twice, he was offered to become a chief in lower order of the warrior group of the Elkhorn Scrapers, but he refused; some white men called him Chief Wooden Leg, but he was never a chief. He had two daughters, but they both died in their youth. After the death of the last daughter, he and his wife decided to adopt the son of his sister, John White Wolf.

In a 1903 interview with Thomas B. Marquis, a former agency physician for the Cheyenne, Wooden Leg related a great deal of information about Cheyenne life prior to the reservations and the battle of Little Bighorn. His account is published in the book Wooden Leg: A Warrior Who Fought Custer.

Wooden Leg died in 1940.

== Sources ==
- "Wooden Leg - University of Nebraska Press", URL accessed 05/27/06
- Thomas B. Marquis. Wooden Leg: A Warrior Who Fought Custer (Midwest Company, 1931).
- Project Gutenberg edition of Wooden Leg: A Warrior Who Fought Custer
