= Black Hawk (artist) =

Medicine man and member of the Sans Arc or Itázipčho band of the Lakota people

Čhetáŋ Sápa (Black Hawk)
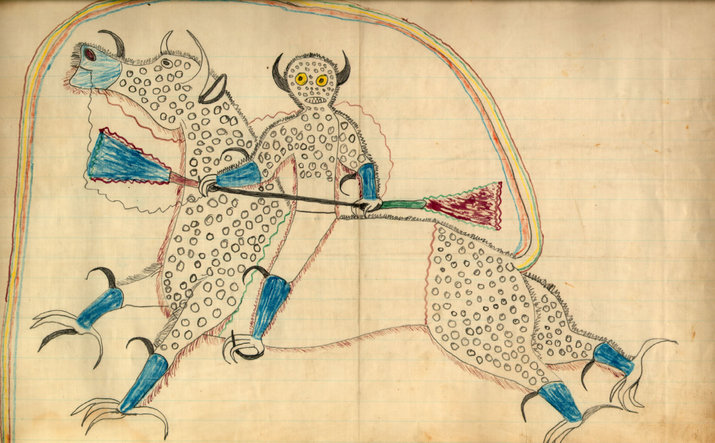
- Dream or Vision of himself changed to a destroyer and riding a Buffalo Eagle, 1880-1881
- Born: Chetan Sapa (Black Hawk) c. 1832; South Dakota
- Died: c. 1890; Unknown
- Citizenship: Sans Arc Lakota
- Movement: Ledger art

Čhetáŋ Sápa or Black Hawk (c. 1832 – c. 1890) was a medicine man and member of the Sans Arc or Itázipčho band of the Lakota people. He is most known for a series of 76 drawings that were later bound into a ledger book that depicts scenes of Lakota life and rituals. The ledger drawings were commissioned by William Edward Canton, a federal "Indian trader" at the Cheyenne River Indian Reservation. Black Hawk's drawings were drawn between 1880-1881. Today they are known as one of the most complete visual records of Lakota cosmology, ritual and daily life.

== Cheyenne River Indian Reservation ==
Knowledge of the Sioux Indians was first recorded by the French explorer Jean Nicolet in 1640. Originally the Sioux occupied the region that is now Minnesota; however, they moved west in the 18th century to avoid conflict with neighboring tribes who had been armed by French fur traders. There are 7 sub tribes within the Great Sioux Nation. They are often referred to as the 7 council fires. One such sub tribe the Teton Sioux is also known as the Lakota people. The Lakota are then divided into 7 additional tribes which includes the Sans Arc or Itázipčho tribe. In 1868 the Fort Leramie Treaty situated the Lakota people on a large reservation predominately spanning over parts of South Dakota and North Dakota. A series of wars occurred between the U.S. government and the Lakota people during the 1870s. Following the U.S. government's victory, in an attempt to further control the Lakota, the government split the Great Sioux Reservation into smaller reservations. In 1889 the Cheyenne River Indian Reservation was formed. A reservation census record shows that Black Hawk and his family lived in the Cherry Creek district of the reservation.

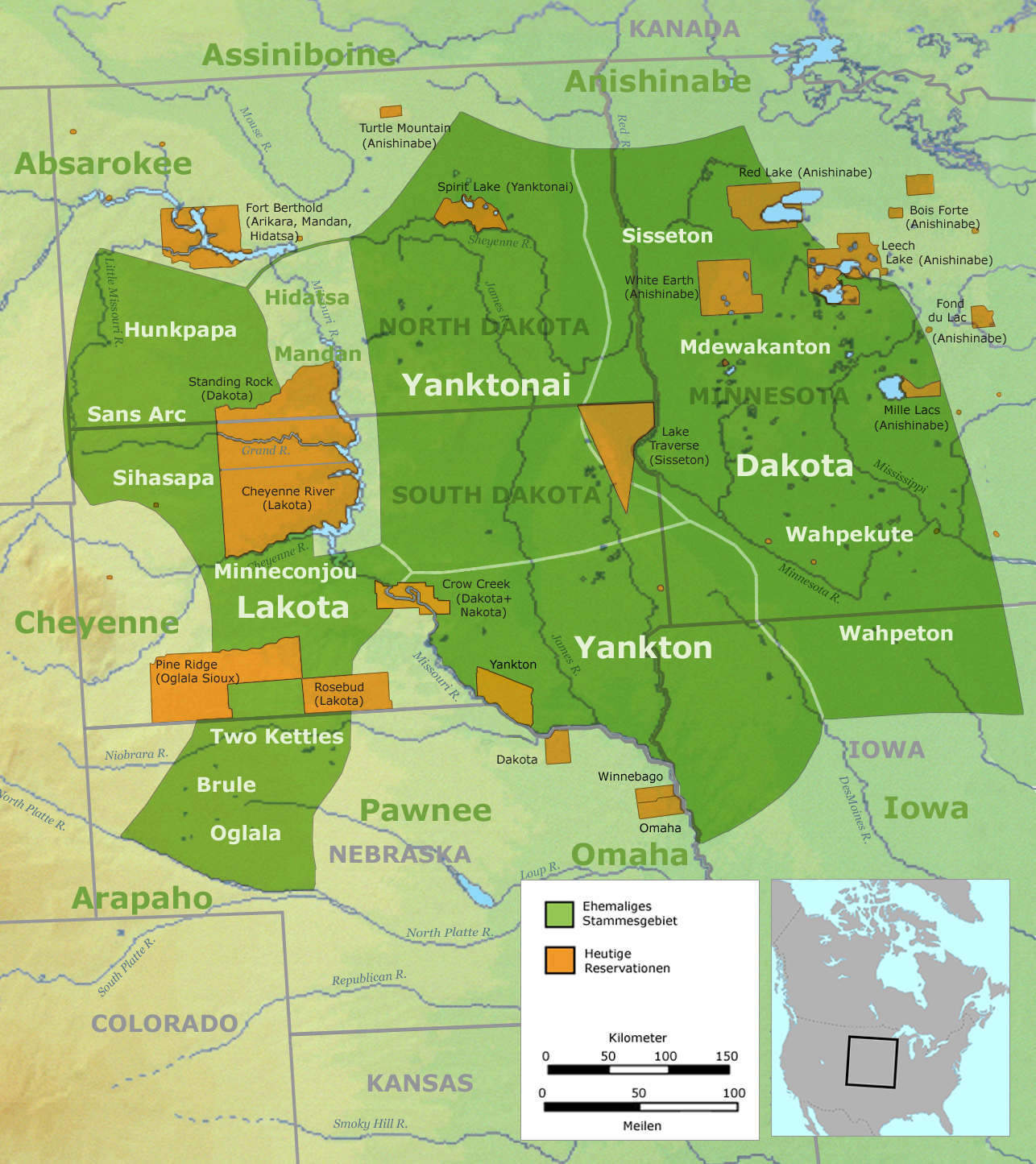
Map showing territories of the Sioux Nation including Sans Arc tribe

== Biographical Information ==
The earliest known record of Black Hawk dates to 1880 when he appears in a collection of census records. In 1868, Article 10 of the Treaty of Fort Laramie stipulated that extensive records of Indians be taken. Documents at the National Archives, Central Plans Region, in Kansas City show evidence of Black Hawk's existence throughout the 1880s. An annuity and goods disbursement record from September 1880 lists Black Hawk as a member of the Sans Arc band.

In these same records, Black Hawk is said to have 4 family members. Based on the items that appear in the log (livestock, stove, bedstead) Black Hawk probably lived in a log cabin with his family. He is thought to have been married to a woman called Hollow Horn Woman and was a spiritual leader in his community. The titled of Black Hawk's ledger book given to it by William Edward Caton reads "CHIEF MEDICINE MAN OF THE SIOUX". The Sioux Nation is made up of many different groups so it is unlikely that Black Hawk was the chief medicine man for the entire population which at the time was around 35,000 to 50,000 people. However it is certain that Black Hawk was what would be known in the Lakota community as a Medicine Man.

The scenes of cosmological visions and ritual that appear in Black Hawk's drawings are rare amongst Lakota art. His ledger book offers insight into the rituals Black Hawk would have performed as a medicine man of the Sans Arc Lakota. Black Hawk had at least one son who is on record as being born in 1862. These same records list Black Hawk's wife as a woman named Hollow Horn Woman. The name Hollow Horn dates back to a Lakota myth in which a woman brings a sacred pipe to chief Standing Hollow Horn and ensures prosperity for the Lakota. Black Hawk lived with his family in the southernmost part of the Cheyenne River Indian Reservation known as the Cherry Creek District. The last record of Black Hawk at the Cheyenne River Reservation was in 1889. Nothing is known about Black Hawk's death but due to the last known date of his existence it is suspected that he died in the Wounded Knee Massacre of 1890 on Pine Ridge Indian Reservation.

== Lakota Tradition and the Medicine Man ==
Though Black Hawk has been described as a medicine man, Berlo notes: "The term medicine man is rather a simplisitic designation for a variety of ritual specialists". The creator of the Lakota universe is referred to as Wakan Tanka meaning "Great Spirit." Lakota holy men are thought to have a greater connection to this force. "Lakota culture possessed a great wealth of rituals, both public and private, that permeated all aspects of life." All animals are thought to be spiritual beings, though some are more wakan than others. The beasts that are especially wakan are buffalo, horses, elks, wolves, weasels, bears, mountain lions, prairie dogs, ferrets, foxes, beavers, and otters. The sacred pipe is the Lakota medicine man's direct connection to Wakan Tanka. Medicine men were thought to have been blessed with "holy vision" and it was common practice for them to share their vision with their fellow Lakota people. Individuals who had visions of the same wakan beings organized together forming societies of holy men, inducting new members when they had the appropriate vision.

A vision quest was an essential part of being a successful holy man. There were many different ways to perform the vision quest but usually the vision quester utilized the sacred peace pipe and a sweat lodge. If the vision seeker was visited by a Thunder Being or Heyoka it was his duty to share the vision with his tribe or he was thought to have disrespected the Thunder Beings. It is evident by Black Hawk's drawing of the Dream or Vision of himself changed to a destroyer and riding a Buffalo Eagle that he was one of the holy few to be visited by a Thunder Being. Black Hawk, Black Elk, and Kills Two are the most referenced Lakota medicine men who left behind artwork."When the Lakota seek knowledge about their state of affairs they seek it through the instructions imparted to the medicine man from animals, birds, and other animate and inanimate forms that serve as his helpers". In 1883, the U.S. Secretary of the Interior decreed that all traditional feats and ceremonies be outlawed as well as all practices of medicine men. Knowing that ritual practices were outlawed at the time Black Hawk created his drawings gives us even further insight into his comprehensive account of Lakota life.

== Ledger Drawings ==
The Indian Trader William Edward Canton commissioned Black Hawk to create a series of drawings during the winter of 1880-1881. According to Edith M. Teall, Canton's daughter, Canton offered Black Hawk 50 cents for every drawing. In 1890 milk was around 14 cents and butter was around 25 cents. Thanks to his patron Black Hawk would have been able to survive the winter which was said to have been harsh. A statement by Caton's daughter and bound into the volume states that Black Hawk was a "Chief Medicine men" [sic] and "was in great straits" in the winter of 1880–1881 with "several squaws and numerous children dependent upon him." It continues: "He had absolutely nothing, no food, and would not beg."

Black Hawk produced 76 drawings during the winter of 1880-1881 with the intention of selling them to Canton. The drawings were not meant to be presented in any order. They were originally done on regular foolscap paper measuring 13'' x 16'' and were cut down to their current size of 10 ¼'' x 16 ½." The materials Black Hawk used were a collection of what Canton had available. The sheets of paper have different water marks on them and are ruled using varying dimensions. Black Hawk drew most of the drawings using only pen, colored pencil, and ink. After Black Hawk gave Canton the drawings he arranged them and had them bound in Minneapolis using a hand-bookbinding technique still used by specialists today. The captions that are alongside the images are also Canton's contribution. Canton arranged the drawings to begin with the most powerful images.

Black Hawk's drawings include seventeen warfare scenes, seventeen natural history scenes, and numerous drawings of Lakota ceremonies. Also included in his illustrations are Black Hawk's spiritual visions, and depictions of Lakota cosmology. While spirit quests were usually a solitary activity, Black Hawk's drawings serve to share his vision with other members of the community. Black Hawk's ledger book is unusual in the history of Lakota tourist art. According to scholarship on the subject it was very rare for a white man to commission a work of art. Typically the Lakota people created works with white buyers in mind and used their wares to trade for goods and services. The unique circumstances surrounding Black Hawk's creation of his 76 drawings suggest William Edward Canton's primary interest was helping Black Hawk and his family.

=== Scenes of Cosmology ===
There are two scenes depicting what is known as a Heyoka or a "Thunder Being" in Black Hawk's collection of drawings. A Thunder Being is a supernatural creature who appears to supplicants in vision quests. The "Thunder Beings" depicted in Black Hawk's book of drawings are a compilation of attributes from a horse, buffalo and eagle. Only a handful of drawings depicting Lakota religious experience remain today. When having the drawings bound Canton situated the two scenes of Lakota cosmology in the beginning of the book to signify their importance. He captioned the images "Dream or Vision of himself changed to a destroyer and riding a Buffalo Eagle" and "Same as first." It can be inferred from this that Black Hawk intended to depict himself as a Thunder Being after a transformation he underwent during a vision quest. The rider and animal are unified by lines representing joint energy. The animal's arms and legs are formed from eagle talons and it has buffalo horns on its head. The beast forms a rainbow with his tail. Additionally, spotting a rainbow was thought to signify the presence of a thunder being.

=== Scenes of Lakota Life and Ritual ===
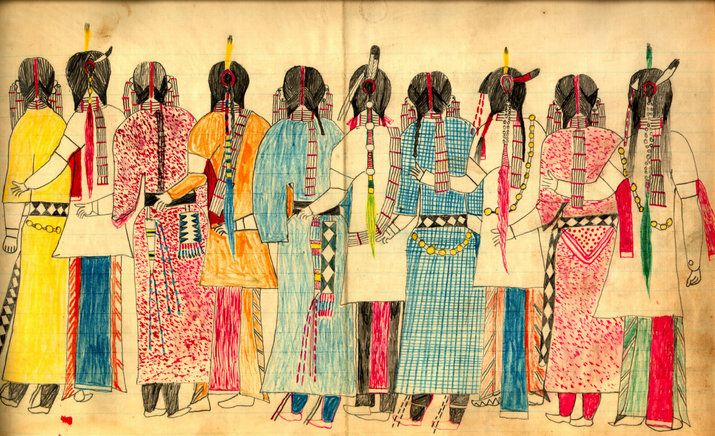
Black Hawk, Drawing of Lakota Ceremony, colored pencil and pen on paper, 1880-1881

Following Black Hawk's depiction of his vision of Thunder Beings is a succession of drawings depicting Lakota religious ceremonies. Catherine Berlo, the foremost scholar on Black Hawk, refers to the images depicting "buffalo transformation ceremonies" as representing the core of his spiritual vision. The buffalo transformation ceremony was carried out by members of a society of holy men known as "Buffalo Dreamers." Similarly there were societies of Elk Dreamers, Deer Dreamers, and Wolf Dreamers. Black Hawk included drawings of all of these societies in his collection of drawings. The images show the members of the tribe dawning animal masks. These masks serve to begin the transformation process, allowing the wearer to become the animal and take on some of its power. To signal this transformation to the viewer Black Hawk gave the participants hooves instead of feet and shows animal tracks behind them.

In addition to illustrating animal transformation ceremonies Black Hawk also included a two images that show female puberty ceremonies. During a woman's menstrual cycle she would be secluded to a tipi where, with the help of a medicine man, she would undergo the transformation to woman hood. Black Hawk's scenes of Lakota rituals and ceremonies are one of the best visual accounts still surviving today. In addition to scenes depicting private religious ceremonies Black Hawk also included scenes of daily Lakota life. The scenes include drawings of tribal counselors, acts of courtship, and dances.

Black Hawk also drew scenes of life in the Sans Arc's neighboring tribe and rivals the Crow Indians. The Crow were known for having elaborate garments and being skilled warriors. Black Hawk depicts a gathering of Crow warriors in which each of the 25 men is uniquely dressed. Black Hawk is one of the only indigenous artists to depict an enemy tribe. Black Hawk's drawings also include several scenes of warfare. In many of the images a warrior armed with a gun is fighting against one armed with a traditional spear. These insights into the techniques of warfare during the late 19th century are invaluable for understanding Lakota history. Catherine Berlo has been able to determine through analyzing the figures war attire that Black Hawk probably belonged to a group of Lakota warriors known as the Miwatani Society recognizable by their red capes and feathers.

=== Scenes of Nature ===
20% of the drawings Black Hawk gave to Canton are scenes of natural history. In seventeen drawings Black Hawk depicts 49 individual animals and at least 15 different species. They include elk, mountain sheep, sandhill cranes, owls, bats, bears, pronghorn antelope, mountain lions, and porcupines. Black Hawk depicts the animals in an encyclopedic nature sometimes including images of both a male and female of the species. Animals are of great importance to Lakota life and religion. Archie Fire Lame Deer once described the Lakota relationship with animals by saying "all wild animals have power because Wakan Tanka dwells in all of them, even in a tiny ant. The white man has built a wall between himself and that power. To understand what the animals are telling us needs time and patience, and the white man never has time." Perhaps in providing such a comprehensive account of the animals Black Hawk viewed on the Great Plains he was attempting to share some of their beauty and power with Canton.

== Provenance ==
In 1993 the ledger book was discovered in a filing cabinet donated to Goodwill Industries. The organization was briefly caught in the middle of a dispute regarding what to do with the valuable artifact. Gayle Byrne, Director of Goodwill Industries reached out to leaders of the Oglala tribe and the Cheyenne River Indian Reservation for instruction regarding the provenance of the book. Questions of whether the organization was in violation of the Native American Grave Protection and Repatriation Act (NAGPRA) were raised. Ultimately in 1994, the ledger book was sold in an auction by Sotheby's Fine American Indian Art division in New York for nearly four hundred thousand dollars and later that year became part of the Eugene and Clare Thaw Collection of American Indian Art of the Fenimore Art Museum where it remains today.

== Legacy ==
Black Hawk's comprehensive account of Lakota life created at a time when the Lakota tradition had never been more threatened has endured over 100 years and remains relevant today. Many contemporary Native American artists look to the art of ledger books as inspiration for their work. Francis Yellow, a contemporary Lakota artist wrote a poem entitled Cetan Sapa Tatehila (Black Hawk's Love). In the poem Yellow writes "Cetan Sapa's love made real on paper across time beyond death with pencil and crayon and something that's moving unseen." Black Hawk's ledger book is a helpful source for the ethnographic examination of Lakota culture.

== See also ==
- Black Elk
- List of Native American artists
- Visual arts by indigenous peoples of the Americas
