= Lame White Man =

Cheyenne leader (c. 1839-1876)

- Vé'ho'énȯhnéhe
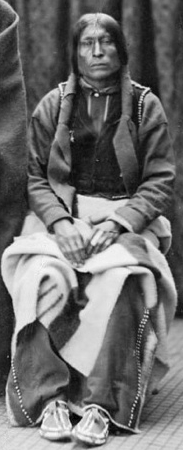

Cheyenne leader

Personal details
- Born: c. 1839 Thomas Marquis' Indian sources claim Lame White Man was only 37 years of age at the time of battle (or 2 years older than Crazy Horse).
- Died: June 25, 1876 (aged 37) Little Big Horn, Montana Territory, U.S.
- Cause of death: Shot
- Spouse: Twin Woman
- Relations: John Stands In Timber
- Children: (2) Red Hat, Crane Woman

Lame White Man, or Vé'ho'énȯhnéhe (c. 1837 or 1839–June 25, 1876), was a Cheyenne battle chief who fought at the Battle of the Little Big Horn, June 25, 1876, and was killed there. He was the only Cheyenne chief to die in the battle.

He was also known as Bearded Man (to the Lakota) and Mad Hearted Wolf (Hahk o ni). He was the husband of Twin Woman and father to Red Hat and Crane Woman. His grandson John Stands In Timber, born after his death, became the tribal historian of the Northern Cheyenne, and wrote the book, Cheyenne Memories (1967), based on the oral history of his people.

== Early life ==
Vé'ho'énȯhnéhe (Lame White Man) was born into the Southern Cheyenne but moved north after the Sand Creek Massacre of 1864. He was also known as Mad Hearted Wolf (Hahk o ni), attesting to his bravery. He married Twin Woman and had children with her.

He became a chief of the Elk Horn Society with the Northern Cheyenne. He still kept ties with the Southern Cheyenne, serving as council chief. He was part of a delegation to Washington, DC in 1873.

== Battle of the Little Big Horn ==
It has been written that during the battle, Lame White Man wore a captured cavalry jacket, which was found tied to the cantle of a saddle. This account is disputed by his grandson, John Stands In Timber. He stated that he wore nothing during the battle but a blanket tied to his waist and moccasins. This information was told to him by his grandmother Twin Woman.

Lame White Man was shot and killed by U.S. soldiers on the west slope of Battle Ridge, where he had led a charge. Later a Miniconjou Lakota warrior (believed to be Little Crow) mistook him for an Army Indian scout and scalped him before realizing his mistake. Lame White Man was the only Cheyenne chief to die at the Battle of the Little Bighorn.

A red granite memorial stone was erected in his honor on Memorial Day 1999 at the Little Bighorn Battlefield.
