= Sans Arc =

Subdivision of Lakota people

The Sans Arc or Itázipčho are one of the seven subdivision of the Lakota people. They primarily live in the Cheyenne River Indian Reservation in South Dakota.

== Name ==
Itázipčho is also written Itazipcola or Hazipco and is a Lakota term translating as "those who hunt without bows." Sans Arc is the French translation, meaning "without bows".

The translator of Wooden Leg: A Warrior Who Fought Custer renders the name as Arrows all Gone.

One of the many etymologies of the Lakota name tells the following story: The true meaning of Itazipacola is "no markings". This referred to the fact that the Itazipco were so generous they did not mark their arrows (they were usually marked so that braves could claim the bison they killed, etc.), that way everyone could share the meat of the hunt. This is why when the Creator wanted to give the pipe to the Lakota, the White Buffalo Woman Wopi brought it to the Itazipco, because they would always be willing to share it.

== Historic Itázipčho thiyóšpaye or bands ==
Together with the Minneconjou (Mnikȟówožu, Hokwoju - ‘Plants by the Water’) and Two Kettles (Oóhe Núŋpa, Oóhenuŋpa, Oohenonpa - ‘Two Boiling’ or ‘Two Kettles’) they were often referred to as Central Lakota and divided into several bands or thiyóšpaye:

- Itazipco-hca (‘Real Itazipco’)
- Mini sala or Minishala (‘Red Water’)
- Sina luta oin or Shinalutaoin (‘Red Cloth Earring’)
- Woluta yuta (‘Eat dried venison from the hindquarter’, ‘Ham Eaters’)
- Maza pegnaka (‘Wear Metal Hair Ornament’)
- Tatanka Cesli or Tatankachesli (‘Dung of a buffalo bull’)
- Siksicela or Shikshichela (‘Bad Ones’, ‘Bad ones of different kinds’)
- Tiyopa Canupa or Tiyopaoshanunpa (‘Smokes at the Entrance’)

== Notable Sans Arcs ==
- Black Hawk
- Hump Nose, a chief present at the Custer fight.
