= Cheyenne =

Indigenous tribe originating from the Great Plains and Great Lakes of the U.S.

Cheyenne Tsétsėhéstȧhese
Total population
- 22,970 (Northern: 10,840; Southern: 12,130)

Regions with significant populations
- United States (Montana, Oklahoma)

Languages
- Cheyenne, English, Plains Sign Talk

Religion
- Traditional tribal religion, Native American Church, and Christianity

Related ethnic groups
- Arapaho, Blackfoot, Suhtai, and other Algonquian peoples

The Cheyenne (/ʃaɪˈæn, ʃaɪˈɛn/ shy-AN, shy-EN) are an Indigenous people of the Great Plains. The Cheyenne comprise two Native American tribes, the Só'taeo'o or Só'taétaneo'o (more commonly spelled as Suhtai or Sutaio) and the Tsétsėhéstȧhese (also spelled Tsitsistas, [t͡sɪt͡shɪstʰɑs]); the tribes merged in the early 19th century. Today, the Cheyenne people are split into two federally recognized nations: the Southern Cheyenne, who are enrolled in the Cheyenne and Arapaho Tribes in Oklahoma, and the Northern Cheyenne, who are enrolled in the Northern Cheyenne Tribe of the Northern Cheyenne Indian Reservation in Montana. The Cheyenne language belongs to the Algonquian language family.

Yellow Bear, Cheyenne Man.

Over the past 400 years, the Cheyenne have changed their lifestyles from Great Lakes woodlands to Northern Plains and by the mid-19th century, the US government forced them onto reservations. At the time of their first European contact in the 16th century, the Cheyenne lived in what is now Minnesota. They were close allies of the Arapaho and loosely aligned with the Lakota. By the early 18th century, they were forced west by other tribes across the Missouri River and into North and South Dakota, where they adopted the horse culture. Having settled the Black Hills of South Dakota and the Powder River Country of present-day Montana and Wyoming, they introduced the horse culture to Lakota people around 1730. The main group of Cheyenne, the Tsêhéstáno, was once composed of ten bands that spread across the Great Plains from southern Colorado to the Black Hills in South Dakota. They fought their historic enemies, the Crow and later (1856–79) the United States Army. In the mid-19th century, the bands began to split, with some bands choosing to remain near the Black Hills, while others chose to remain near the Platte Rivers of central Colorado. With the Arapaho, the Cheyenne pushed the Kiowa to the Southern Plains. In turn, they were pushed west by the more numerous Lakota.

The Northern Cheyenne, known in Cheyenne either as Notameohmésėhese, meaning "Northern Eaters" (or simply as Ohmésėhese meaning "Eaters"), live in southeastern Montana on the Northern Cheyenne Indian Reservation. Tribal enrollment figures, as of late 2014, indicate that there are approximately 10,840 members, of which about 4,939 reside on the reservation. Approximately 91% of the population are Native Americans (full or part race), with 72.8% identifying themselves as Cheyenne. Slightly more than one-quarter of the population five years or older spoke a language other than English. The Southern Cheyenne, known in Cheyenne as Heévâhetaneo'o meaning "Roped People", together with the Southern Arapaho, form the Cheyenne and Arapaho Tribes, in western Oklahoma. Their combined population is 12,130, as of 2008. In 2003, approximately 8,000 of these identified themselves as Cheyenne, although with continuing intermarriage it has become increasingly difficult to separate the tribes.

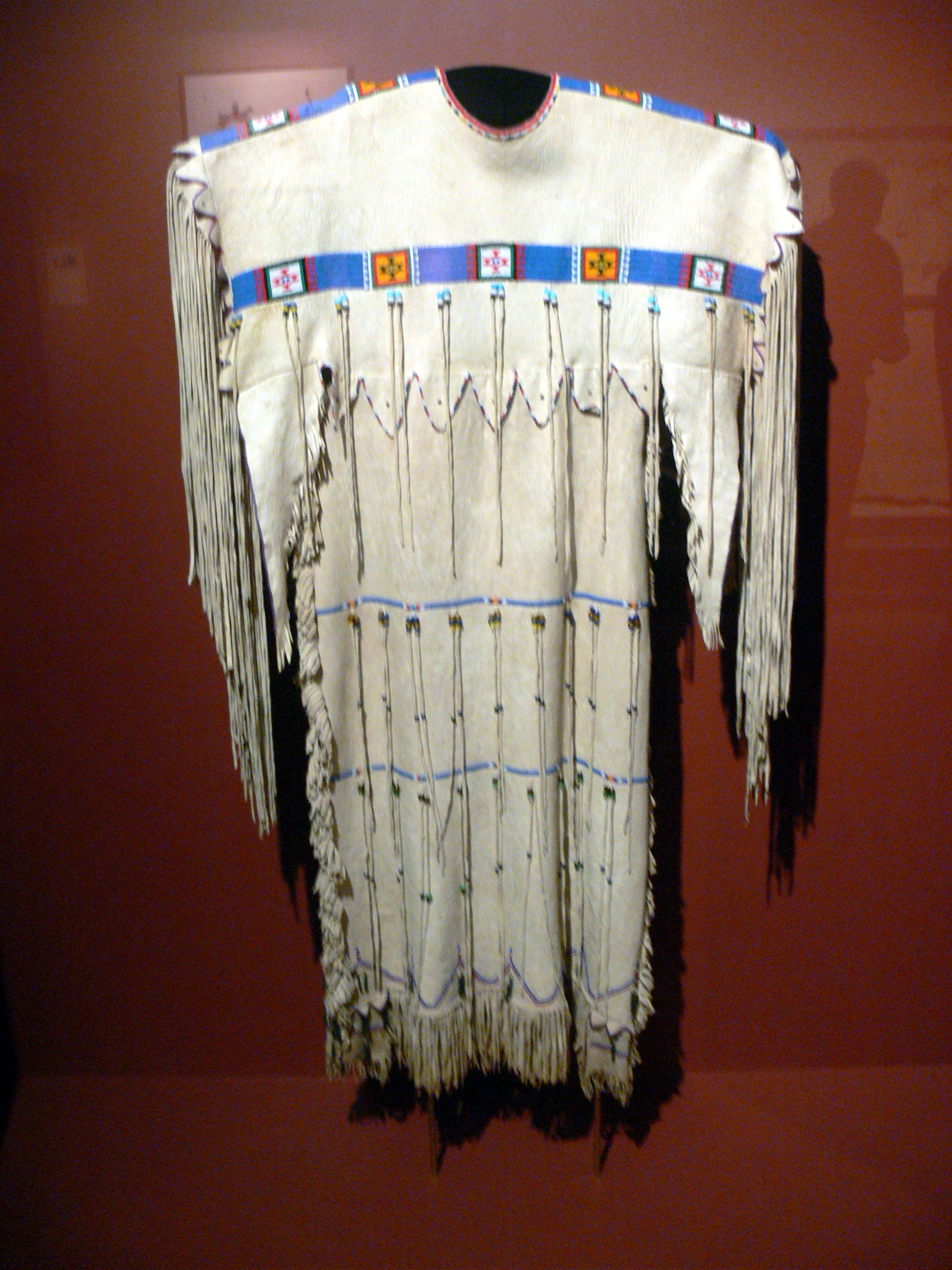
Cheyenne hide dress, c. 1920, Gilcrease Museum

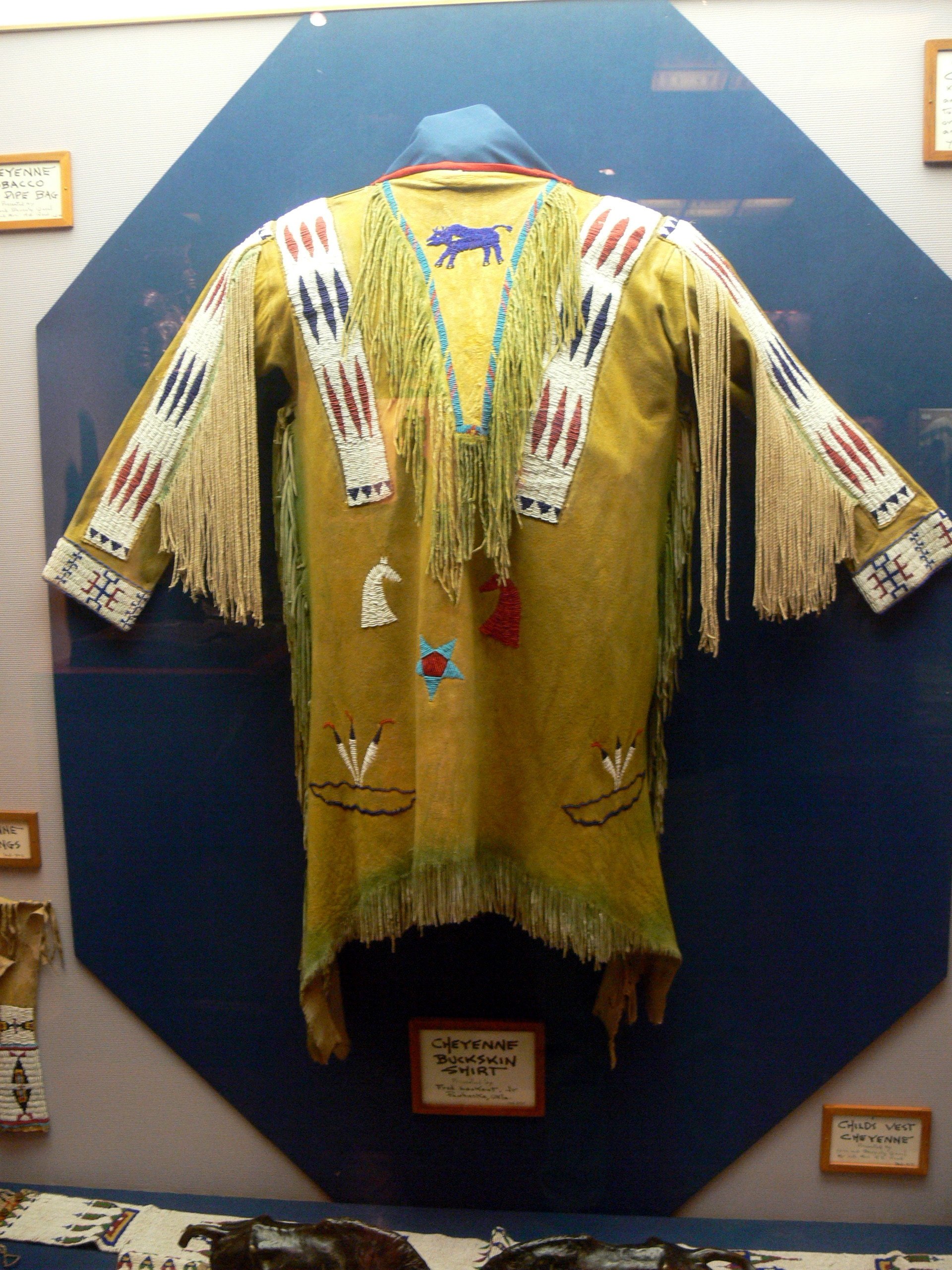
Cheyenne beaded hide shirt, Woolaroc

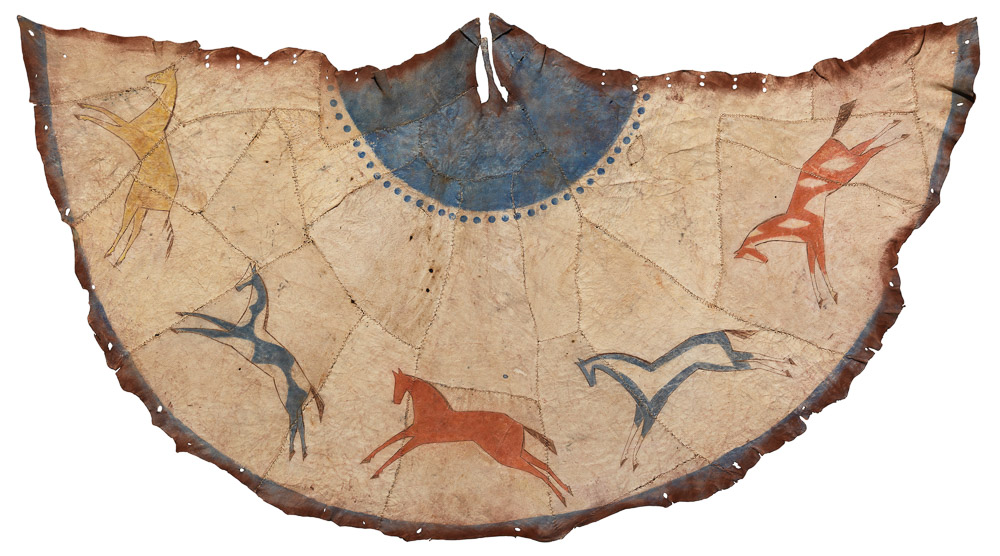
Cheyenne model tipi, buffalo hide, 1860

== Name ==
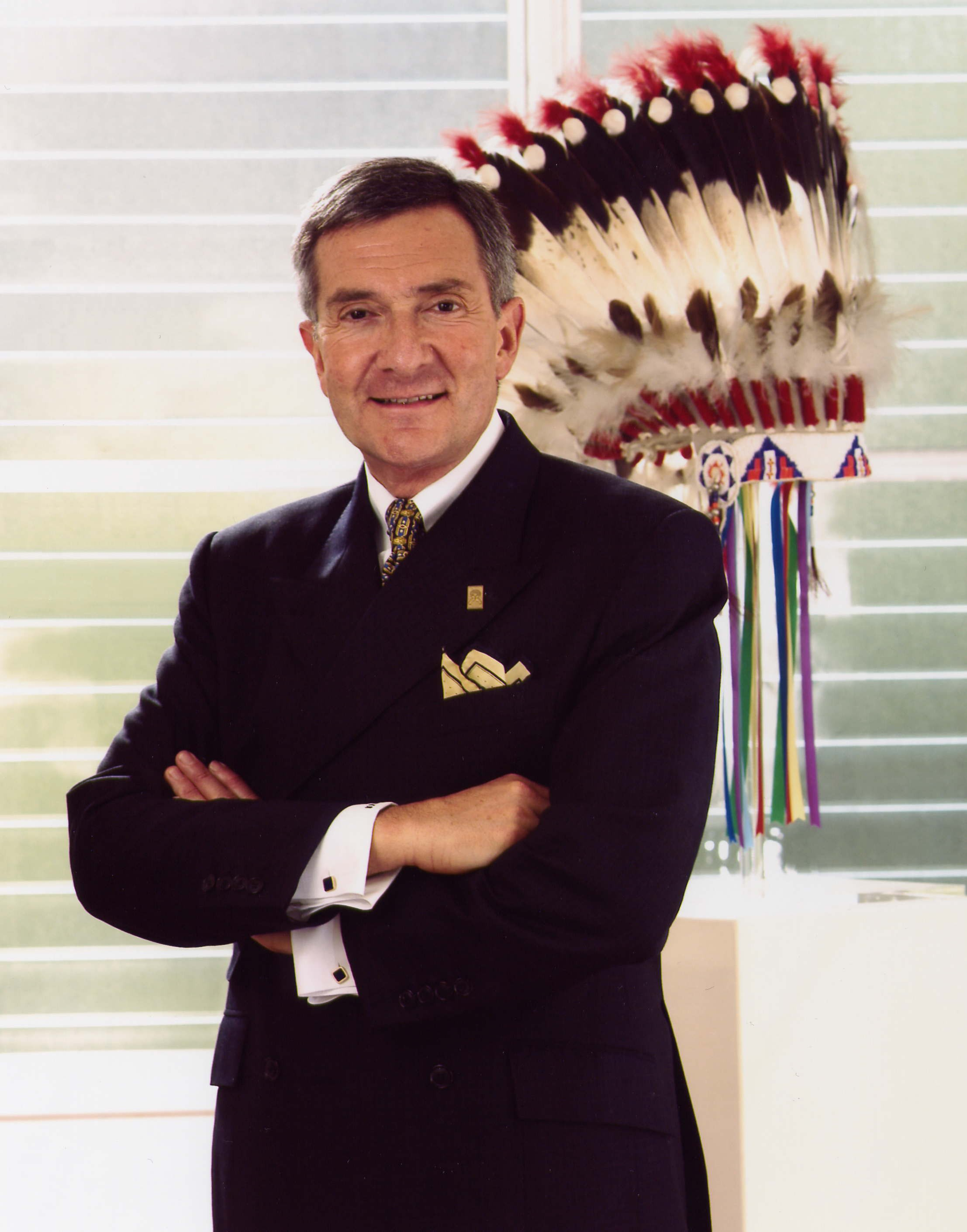
W. Richard West Jr., former director and cofounder of the Smithsonian's National Museum of the American Indian

The Cheyenne called themselves Tsétsêhéstâhese (more commonly as the Tsitsistas; singular: Tsétsêhéstaestse), which translates to "those who are like this". The Suhtai, also called the Só'taeo'o, Só'taétaneo'o, Sutaio (singular: Só'taétane) traveled with the Tsétsêhéstâhese and merged with them after 1832. The Suhtai had slightly different speech and customs from the Tsétsêhéstâhese.

The name "Cheyenne" derives from the Lakota Sioux exonym Šahíyena meaning "little Šahíya". The identity of the Šahíya is not known, but many Great Plains tribes assume that it means Cree or another people who spoke an Algonquian language related to Cree and Cheyenne. The Cheyenne name for Ojibwe is Sáhea'eo'o, a word that sounds similar to the Lakota word Šahíya.

Another of the common etymologies for Cheyenne is "a bit like the [people of an] alien speech" (literally, "red-talker"). According to George Bird Grinnell, the Lakota had referred to themselves and fellow Siouan-language bands as "white talkers", and those of other language families, such as the Algonquian Cheyenne, as "red talkers" (Šahíyena).

The etymology of the name Tsitsistas (Tsétsėhéstȧhese), which the Cheyenne call themselves, is uncertain. According to the Cheyenne dictionary offered online by Chief Dull Knife College, there is no consensus and various origins and translation of the word have been proposed. Grinnell's record is typical and states, "They call themselves Tsistsistas [sic, Tsitsistas is the correct pronunciation], which the books commonly give as meaning "people". It most likely means related to one another, similarly bred, like us, our people, or us. The term for the Cheyenne homeland is Tsistano.

== Language ==
The Cheyenne of Montana and Oklahoma speak the Cheyenne language, known as Tsėhésenėstsestȯtse (common spelling: Tsisinstsistots). Approximately 800 people speak Cheyenne in Oklahoma. There are only a handful of vocabulary differences between the two locations. The Cheyenne alphabet contains 14 letters. The Cheyenne language is one of the larger Algonquian-language group. Formerly, the Só'taeo'o (Só'taétaneo'o) or Suhtai (Sutaio) bands of Southern and Northern Cheyenne spoke Só'taéka'ėškóne or Só'taenėstsestȯtse, a language so close to Tsėhésenėstsestȯtse (Cheyenne language), that it is sometimes termed a Cheyenne dialect.

== History ==
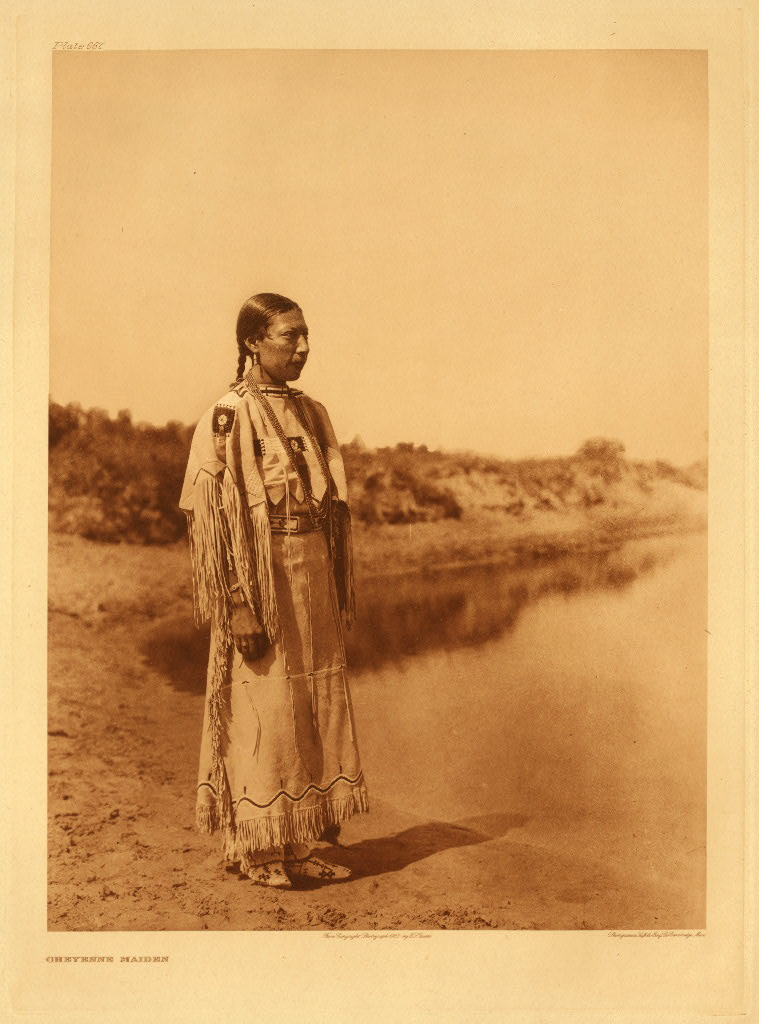
Cheyenne woman photograph by Edward S. Curtis, 1930

The earliest written record of the Cheyenne was in the mid-17th century, when a group of Cheyenne visited the French Fort Crevecoeur, near present-day Peoria, Illinois. The Cheyenne at this time lived between the Mississippi River and Mille Lacs Lake in Minnesota. Their economy was based on the collection of wild rice and hunting, especially of bison, which lived in the prairies 70 to 80 miles west of the Cheyenne villages.

According to tribal history, during the 17th century, the Cheyenne were driven by the Assiniboine (Hóheeheo'o) from the Great Lakes region to present-day Minnesota and North Dakota, where they established villages. The most prominent of the ancient Cheyenne villages is Biesterfeldt Village, in eastern North Dakota along the Sheyenne River. They first reached the Missouri River in 1676. A more recent analysis of early records posits that at least some of the Cheyenne remained in the Mille Lac region of Minnesota until about 1765, when the Ojibwe defeated the Dakota with firearms — pushing the Cheyenne, in turn, to the Minnesota River, where they were reported in 1766.

On the Missouri River, the Cheyenne came into contact with the neighboring Mandan, Hidatsa (Tsé-heše'émâheónese, "people who have soil houses"), and Arikara people (Ónoneo'o), adopting many of their cultural characteristics. They were first of the later Plains tribes to move into the Black Hills and Powder River Country. About 1730, they introduced the horse to Lakota bands (Ho'óhomo'eo'o). Conflict with migrating Lakota and Ojibwe people forced the Cheyenne further west, and they, in turn, pushed the Kiowa to the south.

By 1776, the Lakota had overwhelmed the Cheyenne and taken over much of their territory near the Black Hills. In 1804, Lewis and Clark visited a surviving Cheyenne village in what is now North Dakota. Such European explorers learned many different names for the Cheyenne and did not realize how the different sections were forming a unified tribe.

The modern Cheyenne people descend from two closely related tribes, the Tsétsėhéstȧhese / Tsitsistas (Cheyenne proper) often regarded as the main Cheyenne people and Só'taeo'o / Só'taétaneo'o, are more commonly known as the Suhtai or Sutaio) . The latter merged with the Tsétshéstȧhese in the mid-19th century. Their oral history relays that both tribal peoples are characterized, and represented by two cultural heroes or prophets who received divine articles from their god Ma'heo'o, whom the Só'taeo'o called He'emo.

Cheyenne woman and child.

The Tsétsėhéstȧhese / Tsitsistas prophet Motsé'eóeve (Sweet Medicine Standing, Sweet Root Standing, commonly called Sweet Medicine) received the Maahótse ((Sacred) Arrows Bundle) at Nóávóse (″medicine(sacred)-hill″, name for Bear Butte, northwest of Rapid City, South Dakota, which they carried when they waged tribal-level war and were kept in the maahéome (Arrow Lodge or Arrow Tepee). He organized the structure of Cheyenne society, their military or war societies led by prominent warriors, their system of legal justice, and the Council of Forty-four peace chiefs. The latter was formed from four véhoo'o (chiefs or leaders) of the ten principal manaho (bands) and an additional four ″Old Man″ meetings to deliberate at regular tribal gatherings, centered around the Sun Dance.

Sweet Medicine is the Cheyenne prophet who predicted the coming of the horse, the cow, the white man, and other new things to the Cheyenne. He was named for motsé'eonȯtse (sweetgrass), one of the sacred plant medicines used by many Plains peoples in ceremonies. The Maahótse (Sacred Arrows) are symbols of male power. The Ésevone / Hóhkėha'e (Sacred Buffalo Hat) is the symbol of female power. The Sacred Buffalo Hat and the Sacred Arrows together form the two great covenants of the Cheyenne Nation. Through these two bundles, Ma'heo'o assures continual life and blessings for the people.

The Só'taeo'o prophet Tomȯsévėséhe ("Erect Horns") received the Ésevone (aka Is'siwun – "Sacred (Buffalo) Hat Bundle") at Tȯhóonévose (″Stone Hammer Mountain″) near the Great Lakes in the present state of Minnesota. The Ésevone / Hóhkėha'e (Sacred Buffalo Hat) is kept in the vonȧhéome (old term) or hóhkėha'éome (new term) ("Sacred Hat Lodge, Sacred Hat Tepee"). Erect Horns gave them the accompanying ceremonies and the Sun Dance. His vision convinced the tribe to abandon their earlier sedentary agricultural traditions to adopt nomadic Plains horse culture. They replaced their earth lodges with portable tipis and switched their diet from fish and agricultural produce, to mainly bison and wild fruits and vegetables. Their lands ranged from the upper Missouri River into what is now Wyoming, Montana, Colorado, and South Dakota.

The Ésevone / Hóhkėha'e ("Sacred Buffalo Hat") is kept among the Northern Cheyenne and Northern Só'taeo'o. The Tséá'enōvȧhtse (″Sacred (Buffalo) Hat Keeper″ or ″Keeper of the Sacred (Buffalo) Hat″) must belong to the Só'taeo'o (Northern or Southern alike). In the 1870s tribal leaders became disenchanted with the keeper of the bundle demanded the keeper Broken Dish give up the bundle; he agreed but his wife did not and desecrated the Sacred Hat and its contents; a ceremonial pipe and a buffalo horn were lost. In 1908 a Cheyenne named Three Fingers gave the horn back to the Hat. The pipe came into possession of a Cheyenne named Burnt All Over who gave it to Hattie Goit of Poteau, Oklahoma who in 1911 gave the pipe to the Oklahoma Historical Society. In 1997 the Oklahoma Historal Society negotiated with the Northern Cheyenne to return the pipe to the tribal keeper of the Sacred Medicine Hat Bundle James Black Wolf.

=== Expansion on the Plains ===
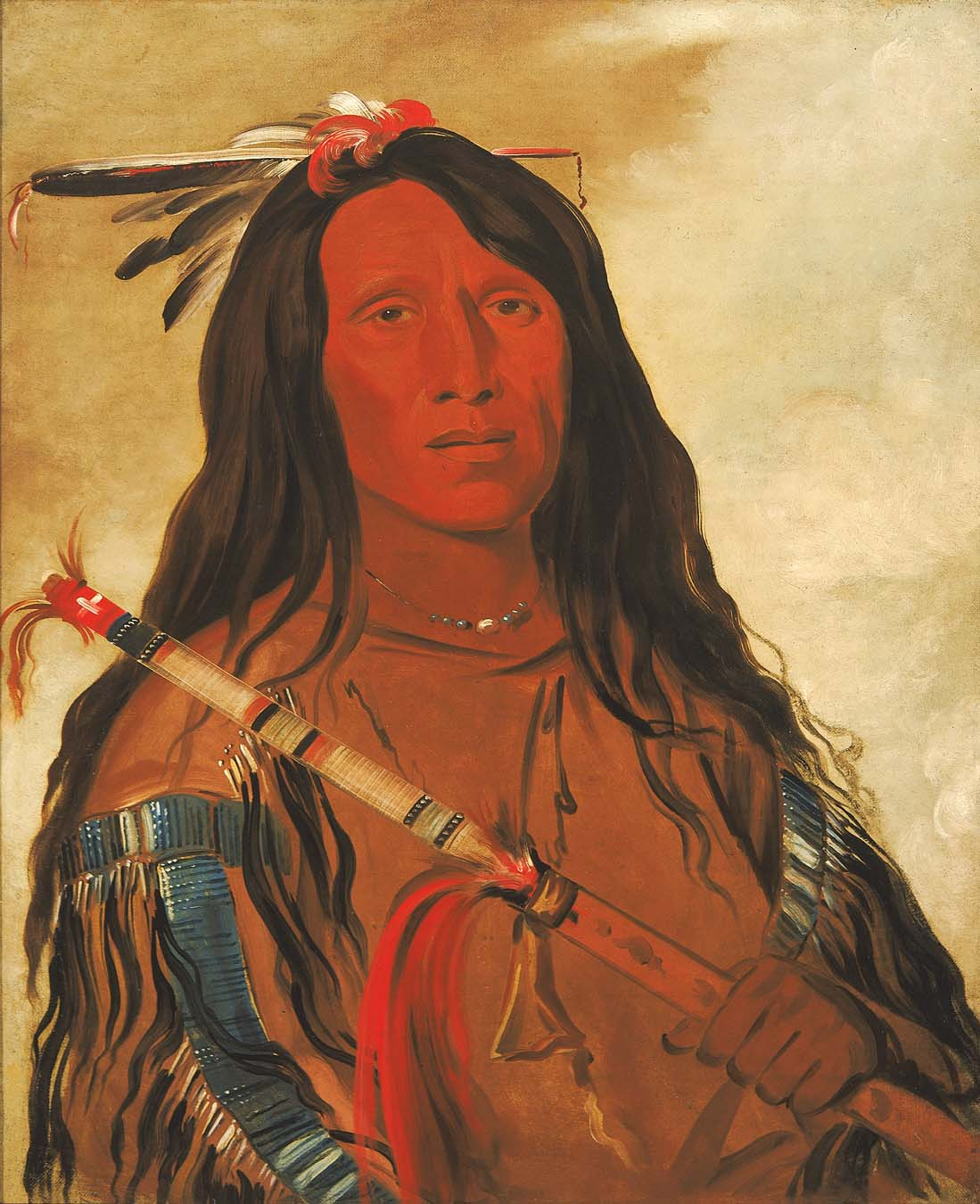
Chief Wolf-on-the-Hill (Cheyenne), portrait by George Catlin, 1832, in Fort Pierre, South Dakota

After being pushed south and westward by the Lakota, the Cheyenne began to establish new territory. Around 1811, the Cheyenne formally allied with the Arapaho people (Hetanevo'eo'o), which would remain strong throughout their history and into the present. The alliance helped the Cheyenne expand their territory that stretched from southern Montana, through most of Wyoming, the eastern half of Colorado, far western Nebraska, and far western Kansas.

By 1820, American traders and explorers reported contact with Cheyenne at present-day Denver, Colorado, and on the Arkansas River. The Cheyenne likely hunted and traded in Denver much earlier. They may have migrated to the south for winter. The Hairy Rope band is reputed to have been the first band to move south, capturing wild horses as far south as the Cimarron River Valley. In response to the construction of Bent's Fort by Charles Bent, a non-Native trader and ally, a large portion of the tribe moved further south and stayed around the area. The other part of the tribe continued to live along the headwaters of the North Platte and Yellowstone rivers. The groups became the Southern Cheyenne, or Sówoníă (Southerners), and the Northern Cheyenne, or O'mǐ'sǐs (Eaters). The two divisions maintained regular and close contact.

In the southern portion of their territory, the Cheyenne and Arapaho warred with the allied Comanche, Kiowa, and Plains Apache. Numerous battles were fought including a notable fight along the Washita River in 1836 with the Kiowa which resulted in the death of 48 Cheyenne warriors of the Bowstring society. In summer 1838, many Cheyenne and Arapaho attacked a camp of Kiowa and Comanche along Wolf Creek in Oklahoma resulting in heavy losses from both sides. Among the losses were White Thunder (keeper of the Medicine Arrows and Owl Woman's father), Flat-War-Club (Cheyenne), and Sleeping Wolf (Kiowa).

Conflict with the Comanche, Kiowa, and Plains Apache ended in 1840 when the tribes allied with each other. The new alliance allowed the Cheyenne to enter the Llano Estacado in the Texas and Oklahoma panhandles and northeastern New Mexico to hunt bison and trade. Their expansion in the south and alliance with the Kiowa led to their first raid into Mexico in 1853. The raid ended in disaster with heavy resistance from Mexican lancers, resulting in all but three of the war party being killed.

To the north, the Cheyenne allied with the Lakota, which allowed them to expand their territory into part of their former lands around the Black Hills. By heading into the Rocky Mountains, they managed to escape the 1837–39 smallpox epidemics that swept across the plains from white settlements but were greatly affected by the 1849 cholera epidemic. Contact with Euro-Americans was mostly light, with most contact involving mountain men, traders, explorers, treaty makers, and painters.

=== Enemies and warrior culture ===
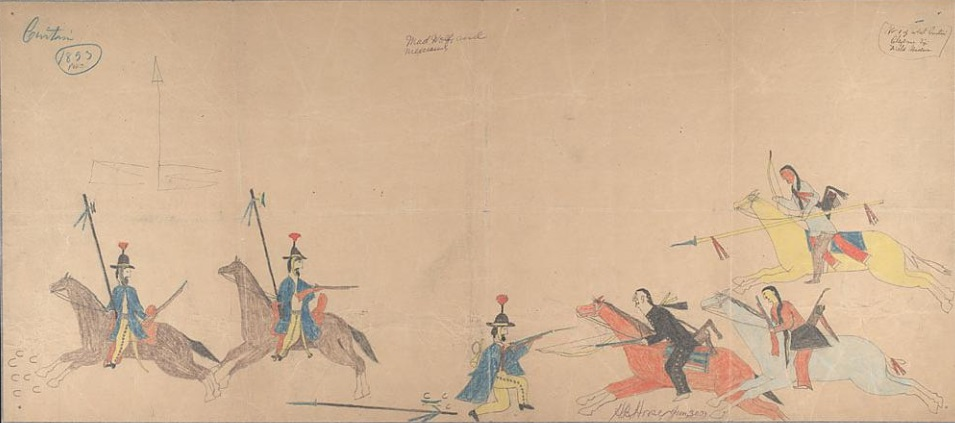
Ledger drawing by Hubble Big Horse showing a battle between Cheyenne warriors and Mexican lancers.

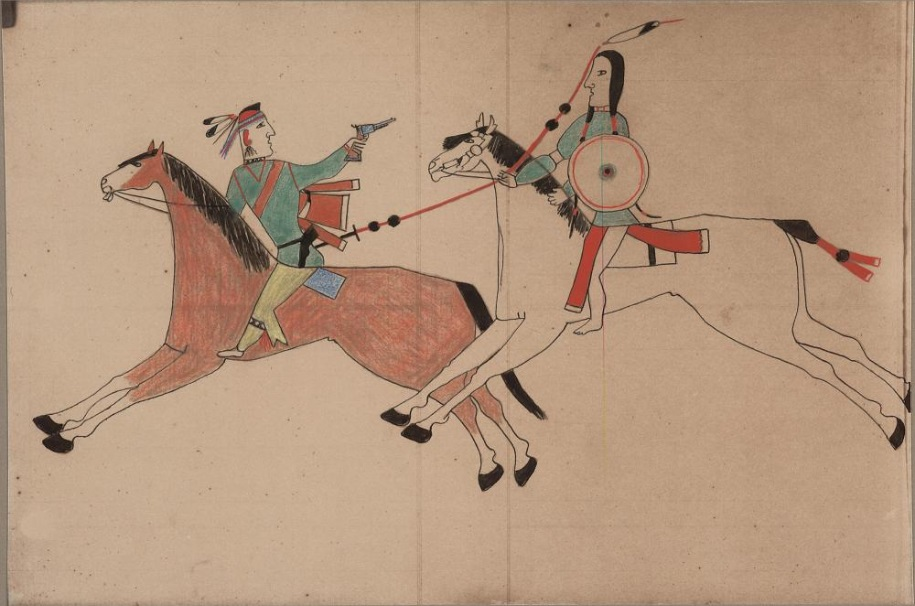
Ledger drawing showing a battle between a Cheyenne warrior (right) and an Osage or Pawnee warrior (left).

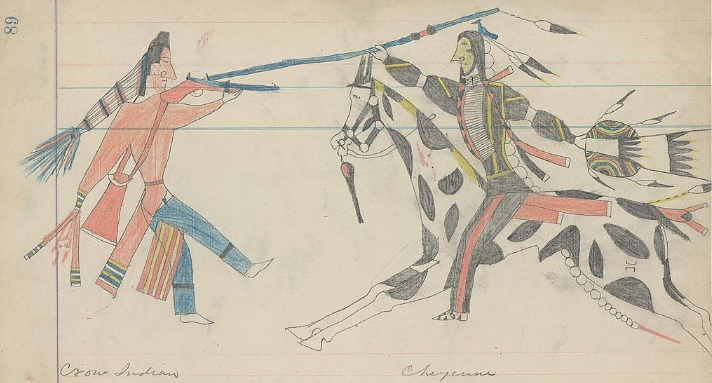
Ledger drawing of a mounted Cheyenne warrior counting coup with lance on a dismounted Crow warrior.

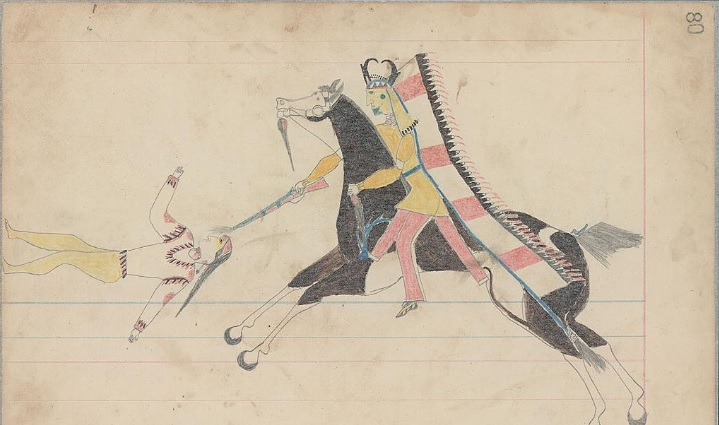
Ledger drawing of a Cheyenne warrior with pronghorn horned headdress, symbol of the Crazy Dog Society.

Like many other Plains Indian nations, the Cheyenne were a horse and warrior people who developed as skilled and powerful mounted warriors. A warrior in Cheyenne society is not a fighter but also a protector, provider, and leader. Warriors gained rank in Cheyenne society by performing and accumulating various acts of bravery in battle known as counting coups. The title of war chief could be earned by any warrior who performs enough of the specific coups required to become a war chief.

Specific warrior societies evolved. Each society had selected leaders who would invite those that they saw worthy enough to their society lodge for initiation into the society. Often, societies would have minor rivalries; however, they might work together as a unit when warring with an enemy. Military societies played an important role in Cheyenne government. Society leaders were often in charge of organizing hunts and raids as well as ensuring proper discipline and the enforcement of laws within the nation. Each of the six distinct warrior societies of the Cheyenne took turns leadering the nation. The four original military societies of the Cheyenne were the Swift Fox Society, Elk Horn Scrapper or Crooked Lance Society, Shield Society, and the Bowstring Men Society. The fifth society is split between the Crazy Dog Society and the famous Dog Soldiers. The sixth society is the Contrary Warrior Society, most notable for riding backward into battle as a sign of bravery. All six societies and their various branches exist among the Southern and Northern Cheyenne nations in present times.

Warriors used a combination of weapons from war clubs, tomahawks, and bows and arrows, and lances to firearms acquired through raiding and trade.

The enemies of the Cheyenne included the Apsáalooke (Óoetaneo'o – "crow (bird) people"), Shoshone (Sósone'eo'o), Blackfeet (Mo'ȯhtávėhahtátaneo'o, same literal meaning), Interior Salish and Kuntenai (Kȧhkoestséataneo'o – "flat-headed-people"), Nez Perce (Otaesétaneo'o – "pierced nose people"), Arikara, Gros Ventre (Hestóetaneo'o – "beggars for meat", "spongers" or Mȯhónooneo'o – lit. "scouting all over ones"), Assiniboine, and Plains Cree (Vóhkoohétaneo'o – "rabbit people") to the north and west of Cheyenne territory. By the help of the Medicine Arrows (the Mahuts), the Cheyenne tribe massacred a Crow camp in 1820. To the east of Cheyenne Territory they fought with the Lakota, Dakota, Pawnee, Ponca, Kaw, Iowa, Ho-Chunk, and Omaha (Onéhao'o). The Pawnee captured the Cheyenne's Sacred Arrows during an attack on a hunting camp around 1830.

South of Cheyenne territory they fought with the Kiowa, Comanche, Ute, Plains Apache, Osage, Wichita, various Apache tribes, and Navajo. Many of the enemies the Cheyenne fought were only encountered occasionally, such as on a long-distance raid or hunt. Some of their enemies, particularly the Eastern Plains tribe such as the Pawnee and Osage would act as Indian Scouts for the US Army, providing valuable tracking skills and information regarding Cheyenne habits and fighting strategies to US soldiers. Some of their enemies such as the Lakota would later in their history become their strong allies, helping the Cheyenne fight against the United States Army during Red Cloud's War and the Great Sioux War of 1876. The Comanche, Kiowa and Plains Apache became allies of the Cheyenne towards the end of the Indian wars on the Southern Plains, fighting together during conflicts such as the Red River War.

=== Relationship with the Arapaho ===
The Cheyenne and Arapaho formed an alliance around 1811 that helped them expand their territories and strengthen their presence on the plains. Like the Cheyenne, the Arapaho language is an Algonquian language, although the two languages are not mutually intelligible. The Arapaho remained strong allies with the Cheyenne and helped them fight alongside the Lakota and Dakota during Red Cloud's War and the Great Sioux War of 1876, also known commonly as the Black Hills War. On the Southern Plains, the Arapaho and Cheyenne allied with the Comanche, Kiowa, and Plains Apache to fight invading settlers and US soldiers.

The Arapaho were present with the Cheyenne at the Sand Creek Massacre when a peaceful encampment of mostly women, children, and the elderly were attacked and massacred by US soldiers. Both major divisions of the Cheyenne, the Northern Cheyenne and Southern Cheyenne were allies to the Arapaho who like the Cheyenne are split into northern and southern divisions. The Southern Cheyenne and Southern Arapaho were assigned to the same reservation in Oklahoma Indian Territory and remained together as the federally recognized Cheyenne and Arapaho Tribes after the reservation was opened to American settlement and into modern times.

The Northern Arapaho were to be assigned a reservation of their own or share one with the Cheyenne; however, the US federal government failed to provide them with either and placed them on the already established Wind River Indian Reservation in Wyoming with their former enemies the Shoshone.

=== Treaty of 1825 ===
In the summer of 1825, the tribe was visited on the Upper Missouri River by a US treaty commission consisting of General Henry Atkinson and Indian agent Benjamin O'Fallon, accompanied by a military escort of 476 men. General Atkinson and his fellow commissioner left Fort Atkinson on May 16, 1825. Ascending the Missouri, they negotiated treaties of friendship and trade with tribes of the upper Missouri, including the Arikara, the Cheyenne, the Crow, the Mandan, the Ponca, and several bands of the Lakota and Dakota. At that time, the US had competition on the upper Missouri from British traders, who came south from Canada.

The treaties acknowledged that the tribes lived within the United States, vowed perpetual friendship between the US and the tribes, and, recognizing the right of the United States to regulate trade, the tribes promised to deal only with licensed traders. The tribes agreed to forswear private retaliation for injuries, and to return stolen horses or other goods or compensate the owner. The commission's efforts to contact the Blackfoot and the Assiniboine were unsuccessful. During their return to Fort Atkinson at the Council Bluff in Nebraska, the commission had successful negotiations with the Otoe, the Pawnee and the Omaha.

=== Effects of the Emigrant Trail ===
Increased traffic of emigrants along the related Oregon, Mormon and California trails, beginning in the early 1840s, heightened competition with Native Americans for scarce resources of water and game in arid areas. With resource depletion along the trails, the Cheyenne became increasingly divided into the Northern Cheyenne and Southern Cheyenne, where they could have adequate territory for sustenance.

During the California Gold Rush, emigrants brought in cholera. It spread in mining camps and waterways due to poor sanitation. The disease was generally a major cause of death for emigrants, about one-tenth of whom died during their journeys.

Perhaps from traders, the cholera epidemic reached the Plains Indians in 1849, resulting in severe loss of life during the summer of that year. Historians estimate about 2,000 Cheyenne died, one-half to two-thirds of their population. There were significant losses among other tribes as well, which weakened their social structures. Perhaps because of severe loss of trade during the 1849 season, Bent's Fort was abandoned and burned.

==== Fort Laramie Treaty of 1851 ====
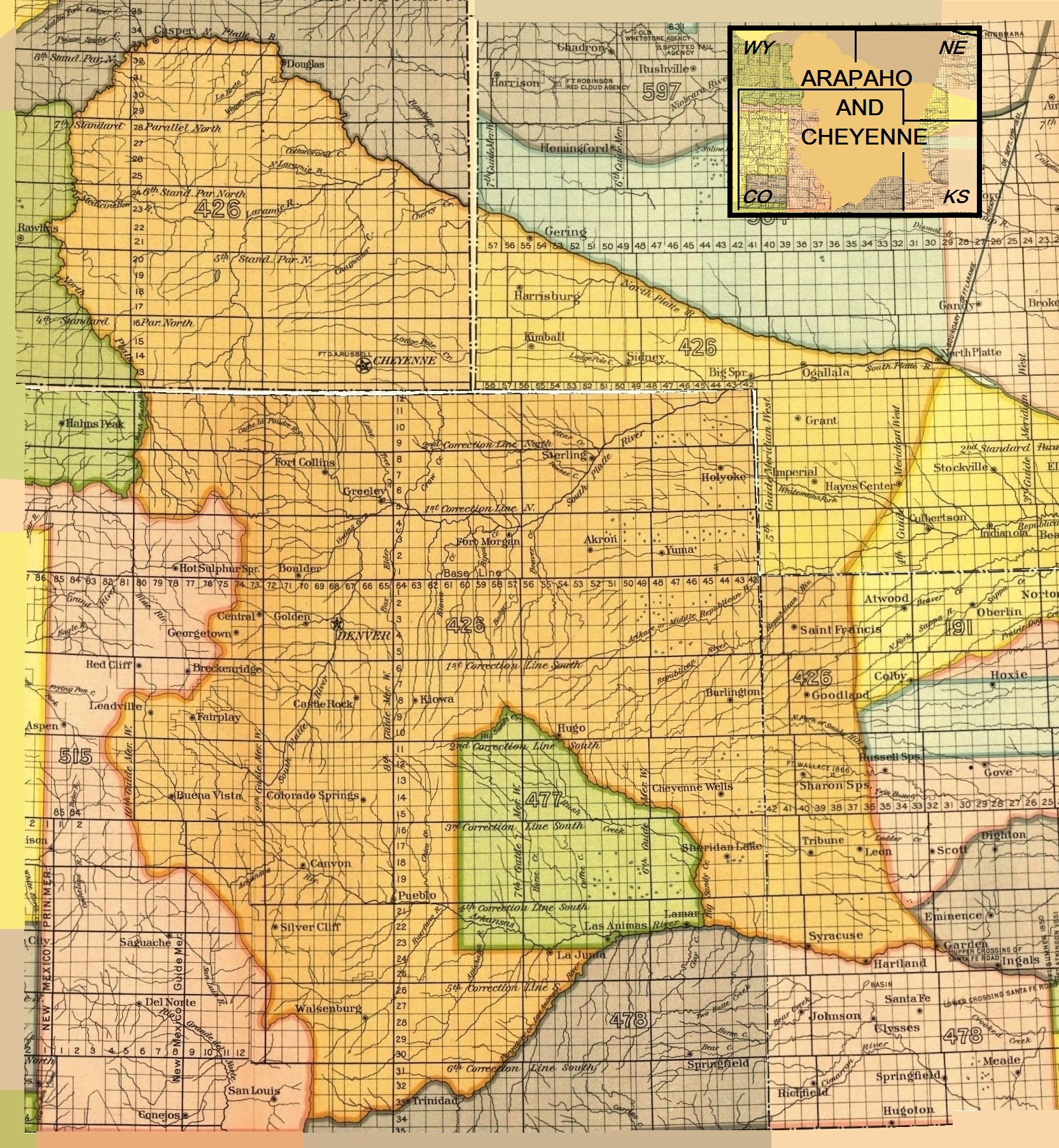
Arapaho and Cheyenne 1851 treaty territory. (Area 426 and 477). Area 477 is the reserve established by treaty of Fort Wise, February 18, 1861.

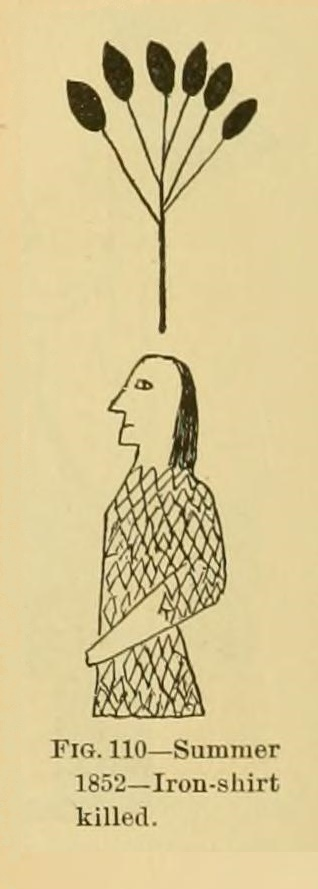
Cheyenne warrior Alights on the Cloud in his armor. He was killed during an attack on a Pawnee hunting camp in 1852

In 1846, Thomas Fitzpatrick was appointed US Indian agent for the upper Arkansas and Platte River. His efforts to negotiate with the Northern Cheyenne, the Arapaho and other tribes led to a great council at Fort Laramie in 1851. Treaties were negotiated by a commission consisting of Fitzpatrick and David Dawson Mitchell, US Superintendent of Indian Affairs, with the Indians of the northern plains.

To reduce intertribal warfare on the Plains, the government officials "assigned" territories to each tribe and had them pledge mutual peace. In addition, the government secured permission to build and maintain roads for European-American travelers and traders through Indian country on the Plains, such as the Emigrant Trail and the Santa Fe Trail, and to maintain forts to guard them. The tribes were compensated with annuities of cash and supplies for such encroachment on their territories. The Fort Laramie Treaty of 1851 affirmed the Cheyenne and Arapaho territory on the Great Plains between the North Platte River and the Arkansas. This territory included what is now Colorado, east of the Front Range of the Rockies and north of the Arkansas River; Wyoming and Nebraska, south of the North Platte River; and extreme western Kansas.

==== Punitive US expedition of 1857 ====
In April 1856, an incident at the Platte River Bridge (near present-day Casper, Wyoming), resulted in the wounding of a Cheyenne warrior. He returned to the Cheyenne on the plains. During the summer of 1856, Indians attacked travelers along the Emigrant Trail near Fort Kearny. In retaliation, the US Cavalry attacked a Cheyenne camp on Grand Island in Nebraska. They killed ten Cheyenne warriors and wounded eight or more.

Cheyenne parties attacked at least three emigrant settler parties before returning to the Republican River. The Indian agent at Fort Laramie negotiated with the Cheyenne to reduce hostilities, but the Secretary of War ordered the 1st Cavalry Regiment (1855) to carry out a punitive expedition under the command of Colonel Edwin V. Sumner. He went against the Cheyenne in the spring of 1857. Major John Sedgwick led part of the expedition up the Arkansas River, and via Fountain Creek to the South Platte River. Sumner's command went west along the North Platte to Fort Laramie, then down along the Front Range to the South Platte. The combined force of 400 troops went east through the plains searching for Cheyenne.

Under the influence of the medicine man White Bull (also called Ice) and Grey Beard (also called Dark), the Cheyenne went into battle believing that strong spiritual medicine would prevent the soldiers' guns from firing. They were told that if they dipped their hands in a nearby spring, they had only to raise their hands to repel army bullets. Hands raised, the Cheyenne surrounded the advancing troops as they advanced near the Solomon River. Sumner ordered a cavalry charge and the troops charged with drawn sabers; the Cheyenne fled. With tired horses after long marches, the cavalry could not engage more than a few Cheyenne, as their horses were fresh.

This was the first battle that the Cheyenne fought against the US Army. Casualties were few on each side; J.E.B. Stuart, then a young lieutenant, was shot in the breast while attacking a Cheyenne warrior with a sabre. The troops continued on and two days later burned a hastily abandoned Cheyenne camp; they destroyed lodges and the winter supply of buffalo meat.

Sumner continued to Bent's Fort. To punish the Cheyenne, he distributed their annuities to the Arapaho. He intended further punitive actions, but the Army ordered him to Utah because of an outbreak of trouble with the Mormons (this would be known as the Utah War). The Cheyenne moved below the Arkansas into Kiowa and Comanche country. In the fall, the Northern Cheyenne returned to their country north of the Platte.

==== Pike's Peak Gold Rush ====
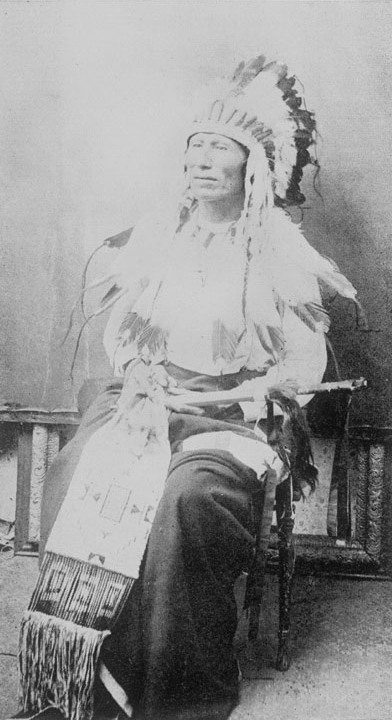
Morning Star (aka Dull Knife) (Cheyenne: Vóóhéhéve or Lakota: Tamílapéšni), Chief of Northern Cheyenne at Battle of Little Bighorn

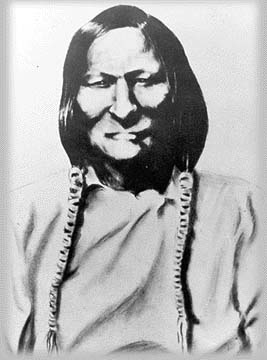
Chief Black Kettle of the Southern Cheyenne, an advocate of peace among his people.

Starting in 1859 with the Colorado Gold Rush, European-American settlers moved into lands reserved for the Cheyenne and other Plains Indians. Travel greatly increased along the Emigrant Trail along the South Platte River and some emigrants stopped before going on to California. For several years there was peace between settlers and Indians. The only conflicts were related to the endemic warfare between the Cheyenne and Arapaho of the plains and the Utes of the mountains.

US negotiations with Black Kettle and other Cheyenne favoring peace resulted in the Treaty of Fort Wise: it established a small reservation for the Cheyenne in southeastern Colorado in exchange for the territory agreed to in the Fort Laramie Treaty of 1851. Many Cheyenne did not sign the treaty, and they continued to live and hunt on their traditional grounds in the Smoky Hill and Republican basins, between the Arkansas and the South Platte, where there were plentiful buffalo.

Efforts to make a wider peace continued, but in the spring of 1864, John Evans, governor of Colorado Territory, and John Chivington, commander of the Colorado Volunteers, a citizens militia, began a series of attacks on Indians camping or hunting on the plains. They killed any Indian on sight and initiated the Colorado War. General warfare broke out and Indians made many raids on the trail along the South Platte, which Denver depended on for supplies. The Army closed the road from August 15 until September 24, 1864.

==== Sand Creek Massacre ====
On November 29, 1864, the Colorado Militia attacked a Cheyenne and Arapaho encampment under Chief Black Kettle, although it flew a flag of truce and indicated its allegiance to the US government. The Sand Creek massacre, as it came to be known, resulted in the death of between 150 and 200 Cheyenne, mostly unarmed women and children. The survivors fled northeast and joined the camps of the Cheyenne on the Smoky Hill and Republican rivers. There warriors smoked the war pipe, passing it from camp to camp among the Sioux, Cheyenne and Arapaho.

In January 1865, they planned and carried out a retaliatory attack with about 1000 warriors on Camp Rankin, a stage station and fort at Julesburg. The Indians made numerous raids along the South Platte, both east and west of Julesburg, and raided the fort again in early February. They captured much loot and killed many European Americans. Most of the Indians moved north into Nebraska on their way to the Black Hills and the Powder River. (See Battle of Julesburg, Battle of Mud Springs, Battle of Rush Creek, Powder River Expedition, Battle of Platte Bridge)

Black Kettle continued to desire peace and did not join in the second raid or in the plan to go north to the Powder River country. He left the large camp and returned with 80 lodges of his tribesmen to the Arkansas River, where he intended to seek peace with the US.

==== Battle of Washita River ====
Four years later, on November 27, 1868, George Armstrong Custer and his troops attacked Black Kettle's band at the Battle of Washita River. Although his band was camped on a defined reservation, complying with the government's orders, some of its members had been linked to raiding into Kansas by bands operating out of the Indian Territory. Custer claimed 103 Cheyenne "warriors" and an unspecified number of women and children killed whereas different Cheyenne informants named between 11 and 18 men (mostly 10 Cheyenne, 2 Arapaho, 1 Mexican trader) and between 17 and 25 women and children killed in the village.

There are conflicting claims as to whether the band was hostile or friendly. Historians believe that Chief Black Kettle, head of the band, was not part of the war party but the peace party within the Cheyenne nation. But, he did not command absolute authority over members of his band and the European Americans did not understand this. When younger members of the band took part in raiding parties, European Americans blamed the entire band for the incidents and casualties.

==== Battle of the Little Bighorn ====
The Northern Cheyenne fought in the Battle of the Little Bighorn, which took place on June 25, 1876. The Cheyenne, together with the Lakota, other Sioux warriors and a small band of Arapaho, killed General George Armstrong Custer and much of his 7th Cavalry contingent of soldiers. Historians have estimated that the population of the Cheyenne, Lakota and Arapaho encampment along the Little Bighorn River was approximately 10,000, making it one of the largest gatherings of Native Americans in North America in pre-reservation times. News of the event traveled across the United States and reached Washington, D.C., just as the nation was celebrating its Centennial. Public reaction arose in outrage against the Cheyenne.

==== Northern Cheyenne Exodus ====
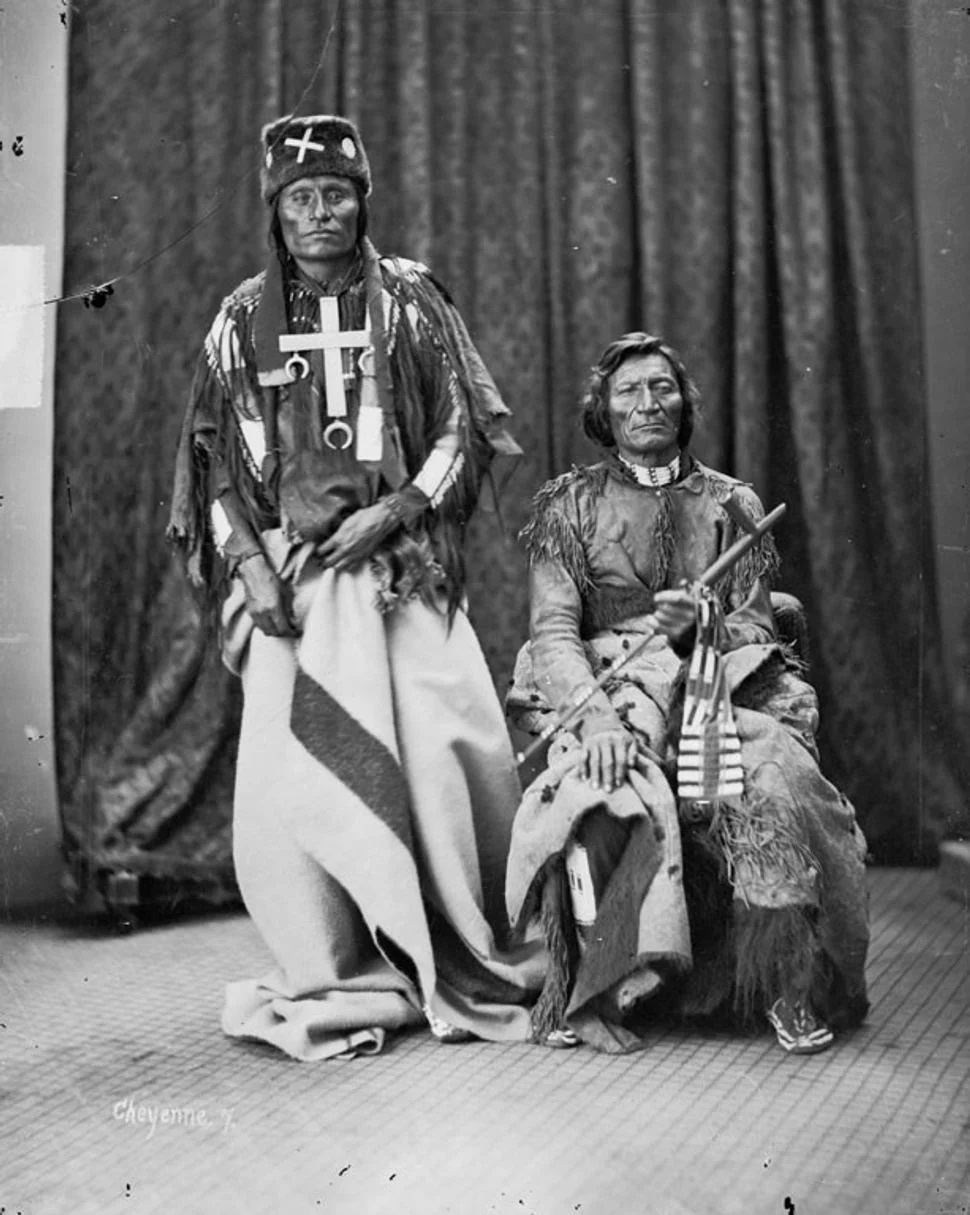
Little Coyote (Little Wolf) and Morning Star (Dull Knife), chiefs of the Northern Cheyenne

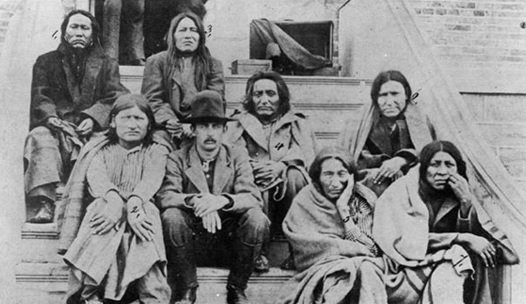
Cheyenne prisoners in Kansas involved in escape northward. From left to right: Tangle Hair, Wild Hog, Strong Left Hand, George Reynolds (interpreter), Old Crow, Noisy Walker, Porcupine, and Blacksmith. All prisoners were released free from charges.

Following the Battle of the Little Bighorn, the US Army increased attempts to capture the Cheyenne. In 1879, after the Dull Knife Fight, when Crazy Horse surrendered at Fort Robinson, a few Cheyenne chiefs and their people surrendered as well. They were Morning Star (aka Dull Knife), Standing Elk and Wild Hog with around 130 Cheyenne. Later that year Two Moons surrendered at Fort Keogh, with 300 Cheyenne. The Cheyenne wanted and expected to live on the reservation with the Sioux in accordance to an April 29, 1868 treaty of Fort Laramie, which both Dull Knife and Little Wolf had signed.

As part of a US increase in troops following the Battle of the Little Bighorn, the Army reassigned Colonel Ranald S. Mackenzie and his Fourth Cavalry to the Department of the Platte. Stationed initially at Camp Robinson, they formed the core of the Powder River Expedition. It departed in October 1876 to locate the northern Cheyenne villages. On November 25, 1876, his column discovered and defeated a village of Northern Cheyenne in the Dull Knife Fight in Wyoming Territory. After the soldiers destroyed the lodges and supplies and confiscated the horses, the Northern Cheyenne soon surrendered. They hoped to remain with the Sioux in the north but the US pressured them to locate with the Southern Cheyenne on their reservation in Indian Territory. After a difficult council, the Northern Cheyenne eventually agreed to go South.

When the Northern Cheyenne arrived at Indian Territory, conditions were very difficult: rations were inadequate, there were no buffalo near the reservation and, according to several sources, there was malaria among the people. On 9 September 1878, a portion of the Northern Cheyenne, led by Little Wolf and Dull Knife started their trek back to the north. After fighting battles with the U.S. army at Turkey Springs and Punished Woman's Fork and reaching the northern area, they split into two bands. That led by Dull Knife (mostly women, children and elders) surrendered and were taken to Fort Robinson, where subsequent events became known as the Fort Robinson tragedy. Dull Knife's group was first offered food and firewood and then, after a week and a half, they were told to go back to Indian Territory. When they said no, they were then locked in the wooden barracks with no food, water or firewood for heat for four days. Most escaped in an estimated forty degrees below zero on January 9, 1879, but all were recaptured or killed.

Eventually the US forced the Northern Cheyenne onto a reservation, in southern Montana.

=== Northern Cheyenne Indian Reservation ===
Flag of the Northern Cheyenne Tribe of the Northern Cheyenne Indian Reservation in Montana

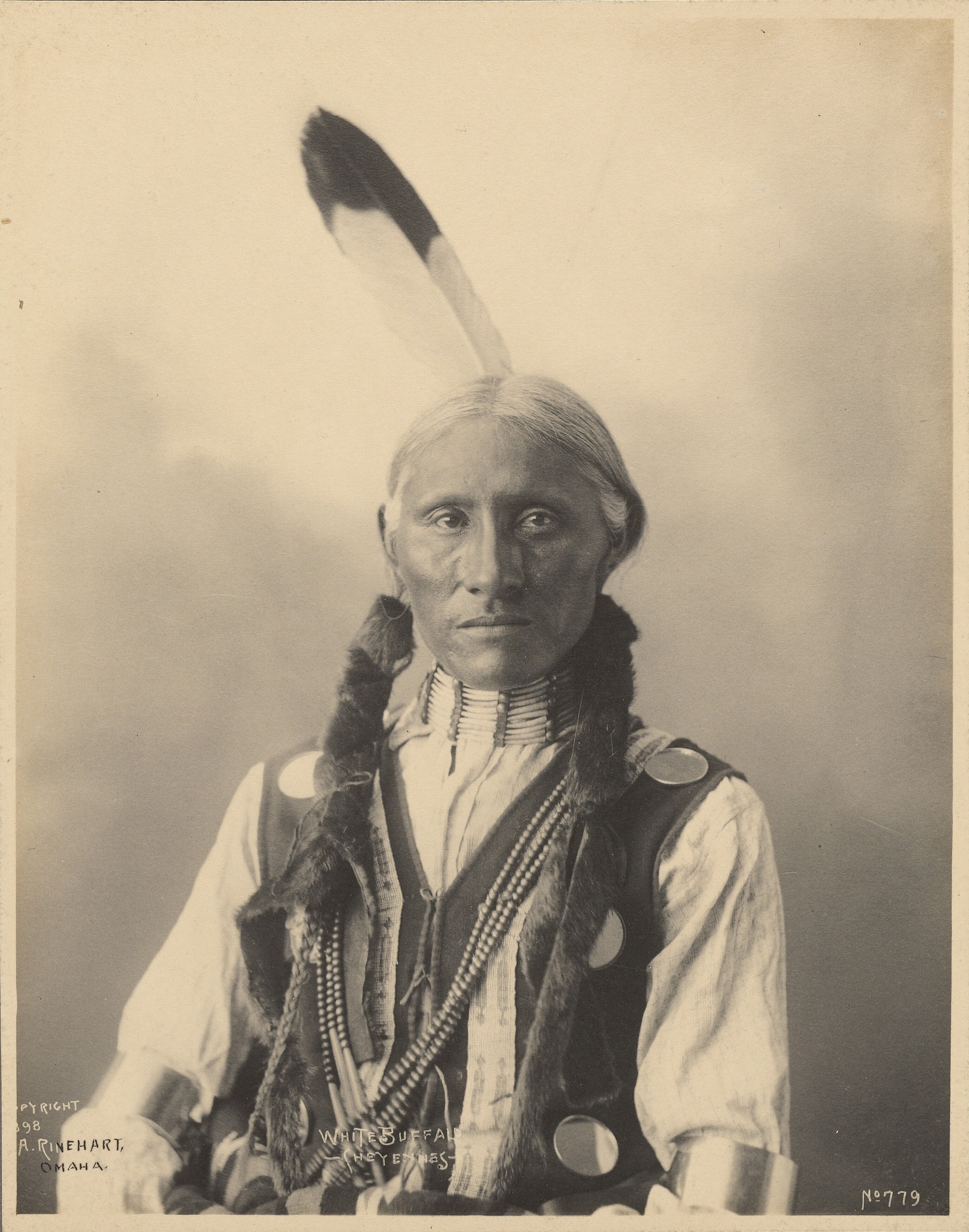
White Buffalo, a Northern Cheyenne chief who received the rank of sergeant in the United States Army.

The Cheyenne who traveled to Fort Keogh (present-day Miles City, Montana), including Little Wolf, settled near the fort. Many of the Cheyenne worked with the army as scouts. The Cheyenne scouts were pivotal in helping the Army find Chief Joseph and his band of Nez Percé in northern Montana. Fort Keogh became a staging and gathering point for the Northern Cheyenne. Many families began to migrate south to the Tongue River watershed area, where they established homesteads.

Map of Indian Reservations in the state of Montana including the Northern Cheyenne Reservation.

The US established the Tongue River Indian Reservation, now named the Northern Cheyenne Indian Reservation, of 371,200 acres (1,502 km^{2}) by the executive order of President Chester A. Arthur November 16, 1884. It excluded Cheyenne who had homesteaded further east near the Tongue River. The western boundary is the Crow Indian Reservation. On March 19, 1900, President William McKinley extended the reservation to the west bank of the Tongue River, making a total of 444,157 acres (1,797 km^{2}). Those who had homesteaded east of the Tongue River were relocated to the west of the river.

The Northern Cheyenne, who were sharing the Lakota land at Pine Ridge Indian Reservation were finally allowed to return to the Tongue River on their own reservation. Along with the Lakota and Apache, the Cheyenne were the last nations to be overpowered and forced on reservations. (The Seminole tribe of Florida never made a treaty with the US government.)

The Northern Cheyenne were given the right to remain in the north, near the Black Hills, land which they consider sacred. The Cheyenne also managed to retain their culture, religion and language. Today, the Northern Cheyenne Nation is one of the few American Indian nations to have control over the majority of its land base, currently 98%.

== Culture ==
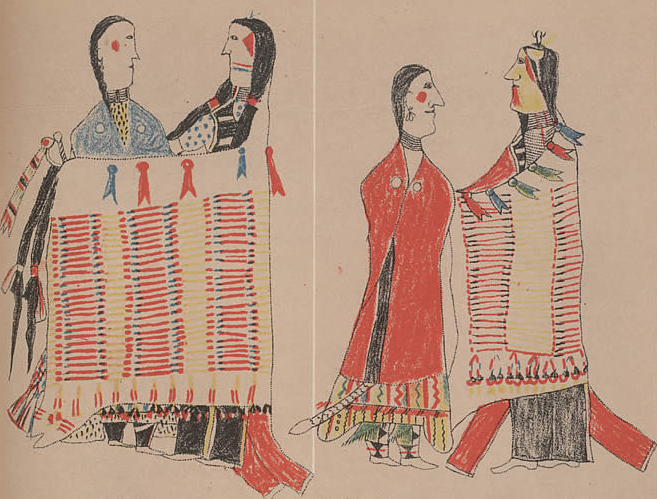
Cheyenne courting scenes, by Big Back, before 1882

Over the past 400 years, the Cheyenne have changed their lifestyles. In the 16th century, they lived in the regions near the Great Lakes. They farmed corn, squash, and beans, and harvested wild rice like other indigenous peoples of the Northeastern Woodlands. They migrated west in the 18th century and hunted bison on the Great Plains. By the mid-19th century, the US forced them onto reservations.

The traditional Cheyenne government system is a politically unified system. The central traditional government system of the Cheyenne is the Arrow Keeper, followed by the Council of Forty-Four. Early in Cheyenne history, three related tribes, known as the Heviqsnipahis, the Só'taeo'o and the Masikota, unified themselves to form the Tsétsėhéstȧhese or the "Like Hearted People" who are known today as the "Cheyenne". The unified tribe then divided themselves into ten principal bands:

- Hevéškėsenėhpȧho'hese (Iviststsinihpah)
- Hévhaitanio (Heévȧhetaneo'o)
- Masikota
- Omísis (Ȯhmésėhese, the Notameohmésėhese proper)
- Só'taeo'o (Suhtai or Sutaio, Northern and Southern)
- Wotápio
- Oivimána (Oévemana, Northern and Southern)
- Hisíometanio (Hesé'omeétaneo'o or Issiometaniu)
- Ohktounna (Oqtóguna)
- Hónowa (Háovȯhnóva)

Each of the ten bands had four seated chief delegates; the remaining four chiefs were the principal advisers of the other delegates. Smaller bands or sub-bands had no right to send delegates to the council. This system also regulated the Cheyenne military societies that developed for planning warfare, enforcing rules, and conducting ceremonies.

Anthropologists debate about Cheyenne societal organization. On the plains, it appears that they had a bilateral band kinship system. However, some anthropologists reported that the Cheyenne had a matrilineal band system. Studies into whether, and if so, how much the Cheyenne developed a matrilineal clan system are continuing.

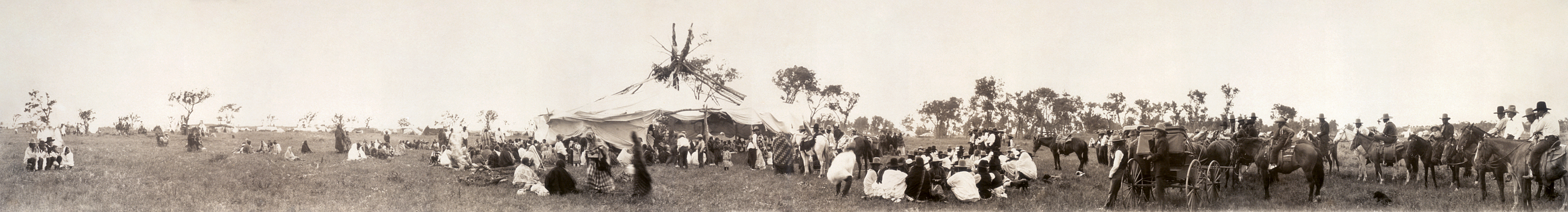
A Cheyenne sun dance gathering, c. 1909.

== Horse culture on the Great Plains ==
While they participated in nomadic Plains horse culture, men hunted and occasionally fought with and raided other tribes. The women tanned and dressed hides for clothing, shelter, and other uses. They also gathered roots, berries, and other useful plants. From the products of hunting and gathering, the women also made lodges, clothing, and other equipment. Their lives were active and physically demanding. The Cheyenne held territory in and near the Black Hills, but later all the Great Plains from Dakota to the Arkansas River.

=== Role models ===
A Cheyenne woman has a higher status if she is part of an extended family with distinguished ancestors. Also, if she is friendly and compatible with her female relatives and does not have members in her extended family who are alcoholics or otherwise in disrepute. It is expected of all Cheyenne women to be hardworking, chaste, modest, skilled in traditional crafts, knowledgeable about Cheyenne culture and history and speak Cheyenne fluently. Tribal powwow princesses are expected to have these characteristics.

=== Ethnobotany ===
An infusion of the pulverized leaves and blossoms of tansy is used for dizziness and weakness. They give dried leaves of Sagittaria cuneata to horses for urinary troubles and for a sore mouth.

== Cheyenne figures ==
=== Historical ===
- George Bent (1843–1918), son of Owl Woman, warrior, interpreter and Cheyenne historian
- Black Kettle (Cheyenne: Mo'ȯhtavetoo'o; c. 1803–1868) since 1854 member of the Council of Forty-four and chief of the Wotapio band of Southern Cheyenne, killed by George Armstrong Custer at Battle of Washita River)
- Morning Star (Cheyenne: Vóóhéhéve, better known as Dull Knife, a translation of his Lakota name Tamílapéšni, (Note: Recorded as Tah-me-la-pash-me; from ta (his) + míla (big knife) + péšni (dull)); 1810–1883) Head chief of the Northern Cheyenne
- Little Wolf (Cheyenne: Ó'kȯhómȯxháahketa, more correctly translated Little Coyote; ca. 1820–1904) Northern Só'taeo'o chief and Sweet Medicine Chief, was one of the "Old Man" chiefs among the Council of Forty-four, belonged to the Elk Horn Scrapers (Hémo'eoxeso), one of the four original Cheyenne military societies)
- St. David Pendleton Oakerhater (Okuhhatuh or "Making Medicine;" 1847–1931) Southern Cheyenne veteran of the Red River War, Fort Marion prisoner of war, ledger artist, deacon of Whirlwind Mission, sun dancer, canonized saint in the Episcopal Church
- Owl Woman (Cheyenne: Mestaa'ėhehe; d. 1847), daughter of White Thunder (keeper of the Medicine Arrows) and wife of William Bent; mother of George Bent
- Roman Nose (Cheyenne: Vóo'xénéhe) Northern Cheyenne, legendary war hero and chief of the Elk Horn Scrapers (Hémo'eoxeso), one of the four original Cheyenne military societies)
- Tall Bull (Cheyenne: Hotoa'ȯxhaa'ėstaestse) chief of the Cheyenne Dog Soldiers, killed at Battle of Summit Springs
- Two Moons (Cheyenne: Éše'he Ȯhnéšesėstse (Note: Also known as Ónonevóo'xénéhe (Ree Roman Nose) or Mȧsėhávoo'xénéhe (Crazy Roman Nose))) Northern Cheyenne Chief
- Wooden Leg (Cheyenne: Kȧhamȧxeveohtahe) Northern Cheyenne warrior, fought at Little Bighorn
- Wolf Robe (Cheyenne: Ho'nehevotoomahe) chief, Southern Cheyenne, peacemaker

=== Contemporary ===
- Dr. Henrietta Mann (b. 1934), Southern Cheyenne academic

== Population history ==
Indian agent Thomas S. Twiss in Indian Affairs 1856 estimated the Cheyenne at 2,000 warriors (therefore around 10,000 people) and 1,000 lodges. Indian Affairs 1875 reported them as 4,228 people. Indian Affairs 1900 counted 3,446 (2,037 Southern Cheyenne in Oklahoma and 1,409 Northern Cheyenne in Montana and South Dakota). The 1910 census counted 3,055. In 1921 they numbered 3,281. Cheyenne population has rebounded in the 20th and 21st centuries. The U.S. census of 2020 counted 22,979.

== See also ==
- Cheyenne and Arapaho Tribes
- Native American tribes in Nebraska
- The Cheyenne Indians: Their History and Lifeways
