= Pawnee capture of the Cheyenne Sacred Arrows =

Intertribal battle
Date	C. 1830
Location	Mid-central present-day Nebraska
Result	Pawnee victory

Belligerents
Cheyenne, Arapaho, and Lakota	Skidi Pawnee and some Pawnee from the South Bands

Commanders and leaders
Unknown	Chief Big Eagle, keeper of the Morning Star bundle

Strength
The whole Cheyenne tribe and an unknown number of allies	Unknown, but a big Pawnee camp

Casualties and losses
Unknown	Unknown
- The Cheyenne lost the Sacred Arrows during the battle, described as "the greatest disaster" in Cheyenne history.

The Pawnee capture of the Cheyenne Sacred Arrows occurred around 1830 in central Nebraska, when the Cheyenne attacked a group from the Skidi Pawnee tribe, who were hunting bison. The Cheyenne had with them their sacred bundle of four arrows, called the Maahōtse. During the battle, this sacred, ceremonial object was taken by the Pawnee. The Cheyenne initially made replica arrows but also tried to get the originals back. They recovered one from the Pawnee directly, either given to them or taken by them, and a second was captured by the Lakota and returned to the Cheyenne in exchange for horses. The two corresponding replicas were ceremonially returned to the Black Hills, where the arrows were traditionally believed to have originated. Eventually the bundles were re-established and the societies and their ceremonies continue into the present day.

== Background ==
Likely, the Pawnee lived in villages of earth lodges in the present-day state of Nebraska and northern Kansas already in the 16th century. At the time of the battle with the Cheyenne, the Skidi Pawnee populated the banks of Loup River in the central part of Nebraska. The Chawi, the Kitkahahki, and the Pitahawirata made up the South Bands as they lived south of the Platte River. Just some years later, they would move north and gather in the same area as the Skidi Pawnee. The Pawnee raised corn and other crops near their villages. However, they went on long communal bison hunts in both summer and winter. While out on the plains, they lived in skin tents and tipis.

The final groups of Cheyenne Indians seem to have crossed the Missouri River from eastern North Dakota in the last quarter of the 18th century. For a while, they lived south of the Cannonball River near already-established Cheyenne villages or camps. In the first decade of the 19th century, they mainly camped north of the North Platte. Around 1825, some bands headed south lured by reports about large herds of wild horses between the Platte River and the Arkansas River. This brought them close to the hunting grounds used by the Pawnee.

The Pawnee and the Cheyenne had long been enemies and had fought each other since the Cheyenne first moved into the area. They captured horses and confronted each other on the plains, but neither side achieved any definite lasting advantage over the other.

=== Sacred Arrows ===
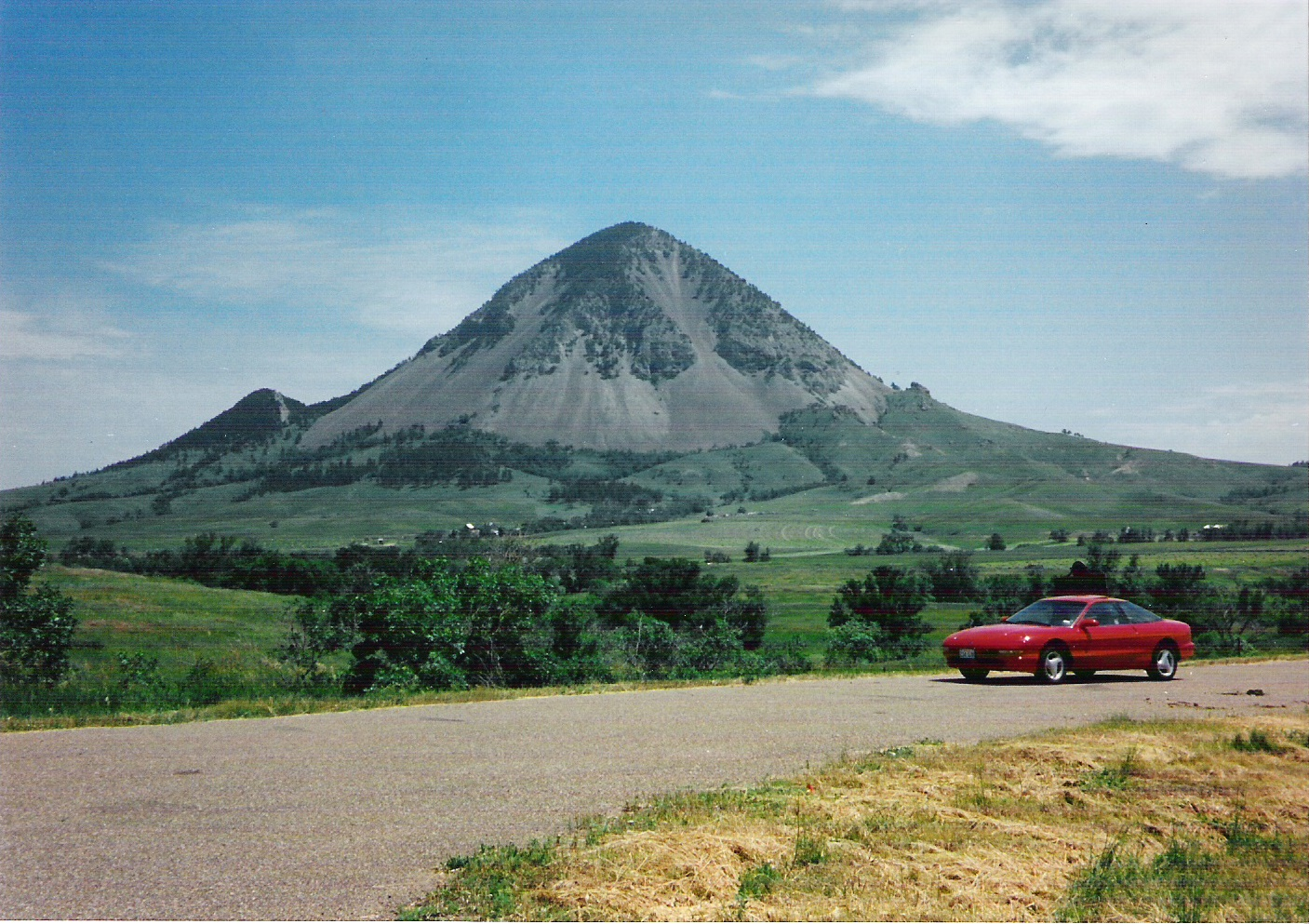
Bear Butte. The Cheyenne prophet Sweet Medicine received the Sacred Arrows on Bear Butte, South Dakota.

According to his traditional biography, the Cheyenne ancestral hero Sweet Medicine received the Sacred Arrows (Maahōtse) as a gift from supernatural beings, after being taken into a sacred cave at Bear Butte in the Black Hills. The two Buffalo Arrows in the bundle were painted red and provided for good hunting. The two Man Arrows were painted black and were instead for war′. When the four arrows were tied near the top of a lance in two separate pairs and carried against an enemy after the performance of the proper ceremony, they promised victory, and had already been present in the total destruction of a big Crow camp at Tongue River in 1820.

The renewal of the arrows forms one of the most sacred of the Cheyenne ceremonies and traditionally takes place during the same time every summer, as well as in response to unfortunate events, such as a homicide or other tragedy.

== Prelude ==
A year before this historic battle, a party of Cheyenne warriors intended to raid the Pawnee near the lower Platte. The party was discovered and all killed, just as the Cheyenne had done ten years before after the killing of thirty Cheyenne Bowstring warriors by the Crow. The tribe vowed to avenge the war group by moving the against those to blame for the killings.

In the summer of 1830, the entire Cheyenne tribe started down the Platte. (Note: The year 1830 was agreed upon by a Cheyenne and a Pawnee, both participating in the battle. Although some give the year as 1833.) A number of allied Lakota and Arapaho joined. The special custodian or keeper of the Sacred Arrows, White Thunder, and his wife led them. The scouts sent out to locate the enemy found no traces of the Pawnee. By chance, the group came across four messengers from a party of scouts, who had been killed by the Pawnee. The scouts finally located a large camp of Pawnees at the head of the South Loup. (According to the Pawnee, they had camp somewhere on Platte River).

After marching for another day and night march, the body of people reached a place near the Pawnee camp in the early morning. The warriors prepared for battle. The women and children grouped in a circle where they had a view of the flat area soon to become a battlefield. The Pawnee camp seems to have been hidden on the other side of a ridge.

The Cheyenne warriors and their allies placed themselves in two separate wings. The Sacred Arrows were in front of one wing, and the other wing would follow a man wearing the sacred Buffalo Hat. "These two great medicines protected all who were behind them ... and rendered the enemy in front helpless".

Meanwhile, the first bison hunters left the Pawnee camp and almost stumbled on the lined of the army. The battle was on, and White Thunder was unable to restrain the Cheyenne. Without having performed the required ceremony, he handed over the arrow bundle to a selected medicine man named Bull. Bull in turn hastily tied the whole bundle to the middle of his lance. Then he mounted his horse and tried to catch up with the rest of the warriors.

== Battle ==
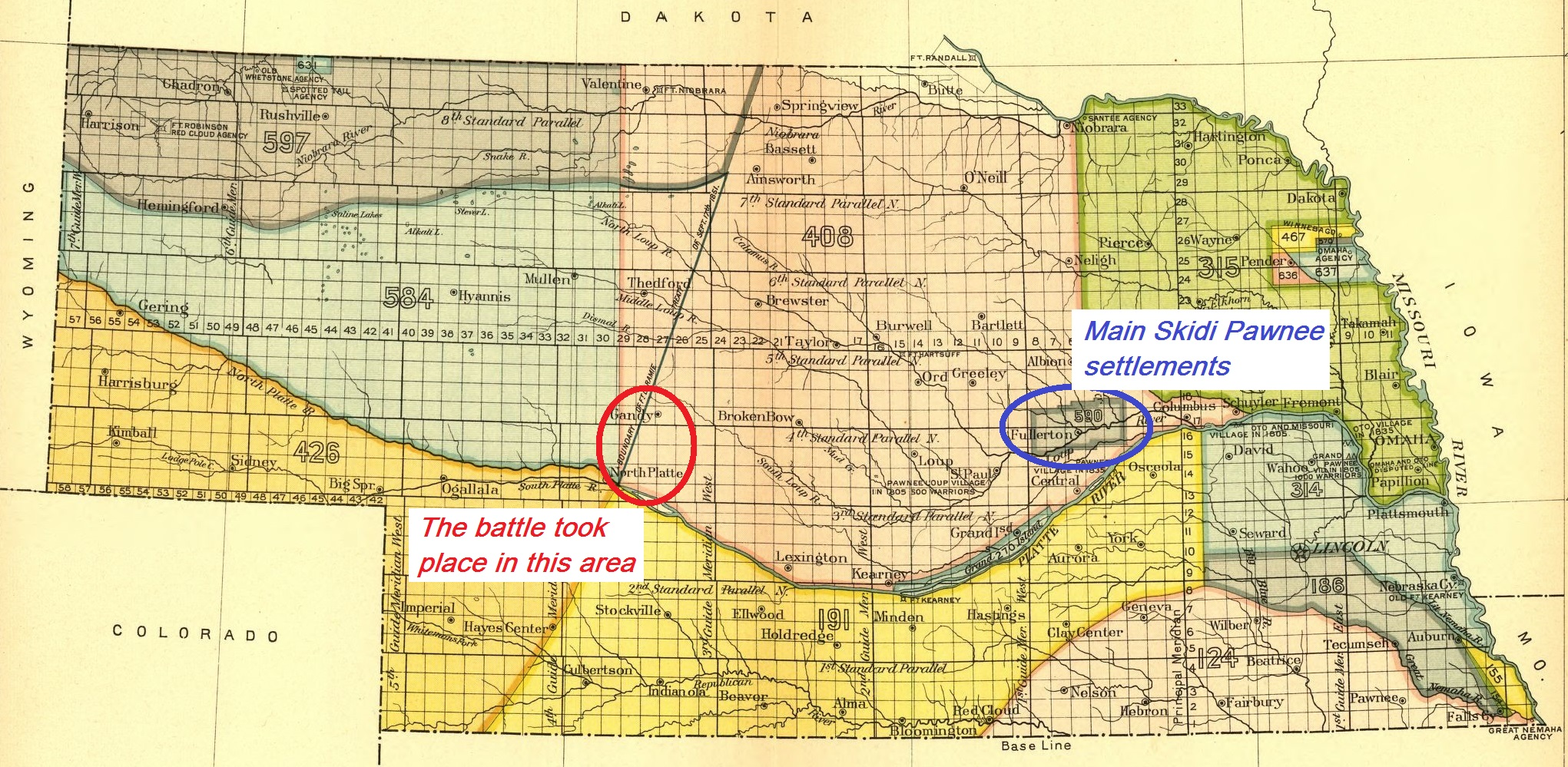
The area where the Pawnee captured the Sacred Arrows of the Cheyenne

"The battle was hard fought". An old Pawnee, apparently a Pitahawirata from the South Bands, was sick and tired of living. He had told his relatives to carry him to the very front line of the battle. He was sitting on the ground with a bow and some arrows. Bull wanted to count coup on this enemy, although the rest of the Cheyenne tried to talk him from it. The old Pawnee avoided the thrust with the lance and seized it. He dragged it from Bull, who slowly rode back to his own line. "This spear must be a wonderful spear ...", shouted the Pawnee, when he saw the medicine bundle in a wrapping of hide tied to it. The Pawnee rushed forward. Chief Big Eagle came first and secured the lance before the Cheyenne could recapture it.

During the fight, Chief Big Eagle wore the Wonderful Leggings of Pahukatawa. The leggings were a part of a tribal war bundle, and they seemed to make Big Eagle fearless. "Through the power of these leggings the Skiri [Skidi] captured the wonderful Cheyenne arrows". Further, Big Eagle was dressed in a red shirt and wore a government medal on his breast. Throughout the battle, he rode on a small spotted horse. Therefore, the Cheyenne remembered him as Spotted Horse or Big Spotted Horse.

According to the Cheyenne, they killed the old Pawnee on the battlefield. The Pawnee say, he first died the next summer during a Cheyenne attack on an almost empty Pawnee village.

With the Sacred Arrows gone and morale low, the Cheyenne failed to withstand a renewed charge by the Pawnee and retreated. "How many were killed on either side was not known". Later, the Cheyenne retreated up the Platte, mourning the loss of the arrows, which George Bent described as "... the greatest disaster the Cheyennes ever suffered."

== Aftermath ==
Pawnee Chief Big Eagle concluded they had captured something of extraordinary importance when he examined the arrows. He was keeper of the Morning Star bundle of the Skidi Pawnee and placed three of the arrows in that bundle.

Sometime after the battle, the best Cheyenne arrow makers made four surrogate Sacred Arrows. However, they also tried in various ways to retrieve the originals. Once, they invited Big Eagle and the Pawnees to their camp. In return for the four arrows they promised the guests many horses. Big Eagle expected treachery and brought just one arrow wrapped in a bundle. As feared, a Cheyenne rode away with the arrow in an unguarded moment. Another source recounts that three Cheyenne, White Thunder, Old Bark, and Doll Man traveled to a Skidi village in 1835 where they were received in Big Eagle's lodge and given one Buffalo Arrow. Despite gifts of more than a hundred horses, no more arrows were returned.

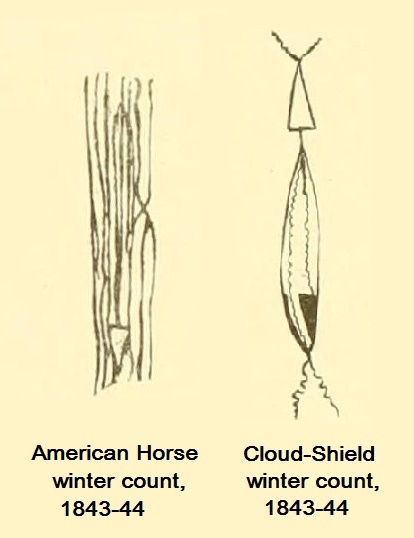
Pictures from two Lakota winter counts, 1843–1844. A Sacred Arrow of the Cheyenne was returned by the Lakota.

In either the winter of 1843 to 1844 according to a contemporary source, or in 1837 according to more modern sources, the Lakota attacked a village of Pawnee and retrieved a single medicine arrow. They recognized the Man Arrow and returned it to the Cheyenne in exchange for one hundred horses.

Two of the remade Sacred Arrows were now in excess. A ceremony was held, and the Cheyenne left two of the new arrows in a bundle in a crevice of the Black Hills, near the place where Sweet Medicine had received the original arrows. There they remained for a long while and were occasionally visited by Cheyenne travelers, before eventually disappearing.

Efforts to restore the additional two original arrows were again made in the 1890s and 1930s to no avail. The return of the remaining arrows remained a source of bitterness for generations.

== See also ==
- Indigenous languages of the Americas
- Native American tribes in Nebraska
- Population history of indigenous peoples of the Americas
