= Sweet grass =

Sweet grass or sweetgrass may refer to:

== Plants ==
- Hierochloe odorata (sweet grass or holy grass), from northern North America and Eurasia
- Sweet-grass or mannagrass, any of the many species in the genus Glyceria
- Anthoxanthum odoratum, Sweet vernal grass, native to Eurasia
- Muhlenbergia sericea, synonym Muhlenbergia filipes, native to the southeastern United States
- colloquially for Cannabis, a psychoactive plant
- Sheath grass belongs to the genus Coleanthus in the sweet grass family

== Places ==
- Sweet Grass, Montana, United States
  - Sweetgrass–Coutts Border Crossing, a major border crossing between Alberta and Montana
- Sweet Grass County, Montana, United States
- Sweet Grass Creek, Montana, United States
- Sweet Grass Hills, Montana, United States
- Sweet Grass, Edmonton, Canada
- Sweetgrass First Nation, Saskatchewan, Canada

== Other uses ==
- Sweet Grass (Cree chief) (1815–1877)
- Sweetgrass (film), a 2009 documentary
