= Grand Island (Nebraska) =

River island in Nebraska, United States

Coordinates: 40°41′43″N 098°51′42″W

Grand Island was a long wooded island near Grand Island, Nebraska. The island was known by French-Canadian traders as La Grande Isle. Grand Island was formed by the Wood River and a channel of the Platte River. It was the original location of Grand Island, Nebraska, but the town was later moved north of the Wood River. Settlers intending to create a settlement there arrived on July 4, 1857, and by September had built housing using local timber. The island no longer exists as the Wood River no longer has a western connection to the Platte.
