= List of people from Steubenville, Ohio =

This is a list of notable past and present residents of the U.S. city of Steubenville, Ohio, and its surrounding metropolitan area.

== Arts ==
- Eliphalet Frazer Andrews (1835–1915) – painter
- Thomas Cole (1801–1848) – artist, oil painter, founder of the Hudson River School of landscape painting
- Alexander Doyle (1857–1922) – sculptor
- Eugene Louis Faccuito (1925–2015) – jazz dancer and teacher, choreographer
- Albert Newsam (1809–1864) – painter, engraver and lithographer

== Athletics ==
- Danny Abramowicz (born 1945) – former NFL wide receiver
- Chinedu Achebe (born 1977) – Arena Football League linebacker
- Johnny Bates (1882–1949) – former MLB outfielder
- Zinn Beck (1885–1981) – former MLB infielder
- Ray Bracken (1891–1974) – Olympic gold medal-winning sport shooter
- Zach Collaros (born 1988) – CFL quarterback
- Chip Coulter (born 1945) – former MLB infielder
- Sylvia Crawley (born 1972) – former ABL forward, women's basketball head coach
- Audrey Deemer (1930–2012) – All-American Girls Professional Baseball League player
- Rich Donnelly (born 1946) – former MLB coach
- Rollie Fingers (born 1946) – former MLB pitcher, National Baseball Hall of Famer
- Tom "Knute" Franckhauser (1937–1997) – former NFL cornerback
- Joe Gilliam, Sr. (1927–2012) – Tennessee Sports Hall of Famer, former college football quarterback and coach
- Mike Gulan (born 1970) – former MLB infielder
- Paul Hoover (born 1976) – former MLB player and current field coordinator for the Tampa Bay Rays
- Jim Hudson (1943–2013) – former NFL and AFL safety
- Tony Jeter (born 1944) – former NFL tight end
- Cal Jones (1933–1956) – All-American football player at Iowa in College Football Hall of Fame
- Don Joyce (1929–2012) – former NFL and AFL defensive end, wrestler
- George Kaiserling (1893–1918) – FL and MLB pitcher
- Eddie Kazak (1920–1999) – former MLB infielder
- Chuck Mather (1915–2006) – Kansas football head coach, Chicago Bears assistant coach
- Najee Murray – defensive back, Kent State 2013–2016 All-Mac; defensive back for Montreal Alouettes Canadian Football League
- Tom Needham (1879–1926) – former MLB catcher
- Tom Perko (1954–1980) – former NFL linebacker
- Wally Pesuit (born 1954) – former NFL and USFL offensive and defensive lineman
- Eric Piatkowski (born 1970) – former NBA forward
- Adam Riggs (born 1972) – former MLB and Japanese Central League infielder
- Will Robinson (1911–2008) – first African-American head coach at a Division I school
- Chaz Roe (born 1986) – MLB Pitcher
- Gene Trosch (1945–2010) – former AFL defensive lineman
- Moses Fleetwood Walker (1856–1924) – first African-American MLB player
- Weldy Walker (1860–1937) – second African-American MLB player
- Johnny Wilson (1915–2002) – former NFL tight end
- Bobby Joe Young (born 1959) – former welterweight boxer

== Business ==
- Dard Hunter (1883–1966) – papermaker, authority on printing

== Literature ==
- Richard C. Banks (1931–2021) – ornithologist, writer
- Bob Borden (born 1969) – writer
- Richard Hague (born 1947) – poet and novelist
- Jeffrey Hatcher – playwright, screenwriter
- Tad Mosel (1922–2008) – Pulitzer Prize-winning playwright
- Mary Bynon Reese (1832–1908) – poet laureate of Steubenville
- Harold Rogers (1996–Present) – novelist
- Mary Tappan Wright (1851–1916) – novelist

== Military ==
- John S. Mason (1824–1897) – Union Army general during the Civil War, Indian fighter
- Anson G. McCook (1835–1917) – Union Army general during the Civil War, U.S. congressman
- Daniel McCook, Jr. (1834–1864) – Union Army general during the Civil War
- Edward M. McCook (1833–1909) – Union Army general, U.S. minister to the Kingdom of Hawaii (1866–1868)
- George Wythe McCook (1821–1877) – Union Army general, Ohio attorney general
- Henry Christopher McCook (1837–1911) – Union Army chaplain and officer, minister
- John James McCook (1806–1865) – patriarch of the "Fighting McCooks" U.S. Army family, physician
- Robert Latimer McCook (1827–1862) – Union Army general
- Cas Myslinski (1920–1993) – USAF officer, athletic director of the University of Pittsburgh (1968–1982)
- Mele "Mel" Vojvodich (1929–2003) – USAF major general

== Movies, television, and media ==
- John Buccigross (born 1966) – ESPN sportscaster
- Frederick S. Clarke (1949–2000) – magazine publisher and editor
- Traci Lords (born 1968) – adult film actress
- Al Mancini (1932–2007) – actor
- Dean Martin (1917–1995) – singer, actor, entertainer
- Will McMillan (1944–2015) – film and TV actor
- Tad Mosel (1922–2008) – playwright and screenwriter
- Jon Nese – meteorologist, TV weather channel personality
- Charles Stanton Ogle (1865–1940) – actor
- John Scarne (1903–1985) – magician, authority and writer on card manipulation
- Jimmy "The Greek" Snyder (1918–1996) – bookmaker, sports commentator

== Music ==
- 4th Disciple, a.k.a. El-Divine Amir Bey – record producer
- Ed Crawford, a.k.a. ed fROMOHIO (born 1964) – musician, guitarist
- Paul Howard (1895–1980) – musician, bandleader
- Kinetic 9, a.k.a. Beretta 9 – musician, rapper
- William H. MacDonald (1849–1906), baritone and actor
- Robert Porco – choral conductor
- RZA (born 1969) – musician, rapper, producer
- Dorothy Sloop (1913–1998) – jazz musician, pianist
- The Stereos (formed c. 1955 and disbanded c. 1968) – doo-wop/pop group
- Patricia Welch (born 1954) – singer
- Wild Cherry (formed 1970 and disbanded 1979) – funk rock band

== Politics ==
- Douglas Applegate (1928–2021) – former member of the U.S. House of Representatives (1977–1995)
- Ed Buck (born 1954) – Democrat political activist, convicted murderer, and fundraiser
- Jacob Pitzer Cowan (1823–1895) – member of the U.S. House of Representatives (1875–1877)
- Joseph S. Fowler (1820–1902) – United States senator (1866–1871)
- John M. Goodenow (1782–1838) – former member of the U.S. House of Representatives (1829–1830)
- Robert H. Hatton (1826–1862) – United States congressman, confederate during the Civil War
- Joseph P. Hoge (1810–1891) – former member of the U.S. House of Representatives (1843–1847)
- Daniel Parkhurst Leadbetter (1797–1870) – former member of the U.S. House of Representatives (1837–1841)
- Humphrey H. Leavitt (1796–1873) – former member of the U.S. House of Representatives (1830–1833, 1833–1834), United States district court judge
- William C. McCauslen (1796–1863) – former member of the U.S. House of Representatives (1843–1845)
- Anson G. McCook (1835–1917) – Union Army general, former member of the U.S. House of Representatives (1877–1883)
- B. Frank Murphy (1867–1938) – former member of the U.S. House of Representatives (1919–1933)
- Rees G. Richards (1842–1917) – politician
- Edwin M. Stanton (1814–1869) – lawyer, Secretary of War (1862–1868)
- Samuel Stokely (1796–1861) – former member of the U.S. House of Representatives (1841–1843)
- Andrew Stuart (1823–1872) – former member of the U.S. House of Representatives (1853–1855)
- Henry Swearingen (c. 1792–1849) – former member of the U.S. House of Representatives (1838–1841)
- Benjamin Tappan (1773–1857) – founder of the city of Ravenna, Ohio, U.S. senator (1839–1845)
- Edward Vincent (1934–2012) – politician
- Joseph Ruggles Wilson (1822–1903) – theologian, father of President Woodrow Wilson
- Thomas Stokeley Wilson (1813–1894) – jurist and judge, legislator
- Jack Yost (born 1945) – politician

== Religion ==
- Charles Clinton Beatty (1800–1882) – Presbyterian minister, founder of Steubenville Female Seminary
- Daniel DiNardo (born 1949) – Roman Catholic Cardinal, archbishop of Galveston-Houston
- John McDowell Leavitt (1824–1909) – lawyer, Episcopal priest
- Hlib Lonchyna (born 1954) – bishop of the Ukrainian Catholic Eparchy of Holy Family of London
- Stephen Return Riggs (1812–1883) – Christian missionary with the Dakota people, linguist
- David Stanton Tappan (1845–1922) – Presbyterian minister
- Edward F. Walker (1852–1918) – minister, general superintendent in the Church of the Nazarene (1911–1918)
- Joseph Ruggles Wilson (1822–1903) – Presbyterian theologian; father of U.S. President Woodrow Wilson

== Miscellaneous ==
- Dino Cellini (1914–1978) – mafioso, ran casinos for Meyer Lansky
- Charles Dillon Perrine (1867–1951) – astronomer
- Eli Todd Tappan (1824–1888) – educator
- Richard Timberlake (1922–2020) – professor of economics
