= Tappan =

Tappan may refer to:

== People ==
- Tappan people
- Arthur Tappan (1786–1865), abolitionist
- Benjamin Tappan (1773–1857), Ohio senator
- Clair S. Tappaan (1878–1932), California judge and Sierra Club president
- Eli Todd Tappan (1824–1888), president of Kenyon College, 1868–1875
- Henry Philip Tappan (1805–1881), president, University of Michigan, 1852–1863
- James Camp Tappan (1825–1906), Confederate Army Brigadier General
- Lewis Tappan (1788–1873), abolitionist, developer of credit reporting service
- Lewis Northey Tappan (1831–1880), abolitionist, Western pioneer and a founder of Colorado City
- Mary Tappan Wright (née Tappan; 1851–1916), writer
- Mason Tappan (1817-1886), American Politician, US Army Officer
- Mel Tappan (1933–1980), survivalist writer
- Samuel F. Tappan (1831–1913), US Army officer, journalist, Native American advocate
- Stacey Tappan (born 1973), American lyric soprano
- Tappan Wright King (born 1950), editor
- W. J. Tappan (fl. 1881), founder of the Ohio Valley Foundry Company, later renamed Tappan Stove Company

== Places ==
=== United States ===
- Tappan, Ohio, an unincorporated community
- Tappan, West Virginia, an unincorporated community
- Lake Tappan, a reservoir on the Hackensack River
- Old Tappan, New Jersey, a town in Bergen County
- Tappan Lake, a reservoir in Harrison County, Ohio
- Tappan, New York, a hamlet in Rockland County
- Tappan Zee, widening of the Hudson River
  - Tappan Zee Bridge (1955–2017), a former bridge at the Tappan Zee
  - Tappan Zee Bridge (2017–present) (Governor Mario M. Cuomo Bridge), the replacement for the 1955 bridge

== Other ==
- Tappan (brand), a brand of stoves owned by Electrolux, founded by W. J. Tappan
