= A History of All Nations from the Earliest Times =

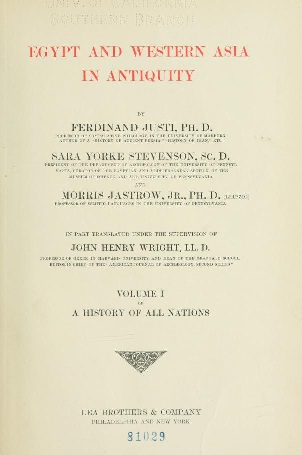
- 'A History of All Nations from the Earliest Times', Volume 1, title page, 1905 edition
- Author: John Henry Wright; Charles McLean Andrews; John Fiske; Heinrich Theodor Flathe; Gustav Hertzberg; Ferdinand Justi; Julius von Pflugk-Harttung; Martin Philippson; Hans Prutz; Frederick Wells Williams
- Language: English
- Subject: History of the mankind
- Published: 1905
- Publication place: United States

A History of All Nations from the Earliest Times is an illustrated, 24-volume work published in 1905. Harvard University professor John Henry Wright was the editor and translator, while authors included Charles McLean Andrews, John Fiske, Heinrich Theodor Flathe, Gustav Hertzberg, Ferdinand Justi, Julius von Pflugk-Harttung, Martin Philippson, Hans Prutz, and Frederick Wells Williams.

== Subject ==
The series attempted to cover the entire history of the mankind. The preface to the first volume of the book stated— "In the wonderful intellectual movement of the past half-century has shared in the advance made by all departments of human knowledge. New sources of information have been opened in every part of the world, which have thrown fresh light on the development of the race in all ages, from the prehistoric period down to the present day... History is no longer a merely superficial account of events which are conspicuous on the surface, — battles and sieges and dynastic changes. It seeks to trace the causes of the events; it concerns itself not only with political but also with social phenomena; it reconstructs society, and explains the development of civilization as this follows the changing fortunes of nations. It is no longer more or less an illusionary romance, but a science which deals with the highest interests of mankind, and teaches wisdom from the lessons of the past."

== Reception ==
Twenty years in the making, the work was described as "a carefully edited translation, slightly condensed, with additions" of the corresponding volumes in Flathe's Allgemeine Weltgeschichte ("General World History").
