= Steubenville Catholic Central High School =

Catholic Central High School

Location
- 320 West View Avenue; Steubenville, Ohio 43952; United States; 40°22′18″N 80°39′40″W

Information
- Type: Private high school
- Motto: Courage, Character, Heart, and Spirit
- Religious affiliation: Roman Catholic
- Established: 1930
- Oversight: Roman Catholic Diocese of Steubenville
- CEEB code: 364805
- Principal: Dr. Todd Phillipson
- Pastoral Administrator: Father Michael Gossett
- Grades: 7-12
- Colors: Blue and Gold
- Athletics conference: Ohio Valley Athletic Conference
- Team name: Crusaders
- Accreditation: North Central Association of Colleges and Schools
- Website: steubenvillecatholicschools.org/cchs/

Catholic Central High School is a private Roman Catholic high school in Steubenville, Ohio, United States. It is one of two secondary schools operated under the direction of the Roman Catholic Diocese of Steubenville. Athletic teams compete as the Catholic Central Crusaders in the Ohio High School Athletic Association as a member of the Ohio Valley Athletic Conference.

== History ==
John King Mussio, after his installation as first bishop of the Diocese of Steubenville, designated Catholic Central (at its former downtown Steubenville location) a Diocesan High School under the administration of a Board made up of pastors of Steubenville, Mingo Junction, and Toronto. In 1947, plans were made for a new Catholic Central High School in the West End of Steubenville (the present location). On January 15 of that year, nine pastors and lay chairmen from each of their parishes met with Mussio in order to formulate plans for a drive to provide funds for the building of the new school. The campaign was launched on February 16, 1947, and was successfully concluded just twelve days later. A tract of land, the old Becker Highway property, was purchased; contracts were let and the present building was begun early in 1949. The new school opened its doors in September 1950 and graduated 171 boys and girls in 1951. In 1963-1964, the present cafeteria and auto shop complex was added, but now the auto shop is used as a weight lifting room. In 1978-1979 a third building project provided the Gymnasium/Bandroom/locker-room complex. In 1979, the new metric track field was added to the existing sports facilities. In 2008, the Bishop Mussio Junior High, housing 7th and 8th grade students was added to the former religion wing.

== Performing arts ==
Catholic Central is home to the Crusader Marching Band, concert band, and drama club.

== Academics ==
Steubenville Catholic Central is a fully accredited high school, meeting all secondary school requirements of both the state of Ohio and North Central Educational Association. Catholic Central High School follows a college preparatory curriculum for their students.

== Athletics ==
CCHS competes in the Class AA division of the Ohio Valley Athletic Conference.

=== Sports offered ===
- American football
- Baseball
- Basketball
- Golf
- Soccer
- Swimming
- Track & Field
- Volleyball
- Wrestling

=== OHSAA State Championships ===
- Baseball - 1994
- Football - 1993
- Girls Track and Field - 2011

Poll Championships:

- 1971 AP/UPI Class AA Ohio State Football Champions

== Notable alumni ==
- Danny Abramowicz, former NFL wide receiver, New Orleans Saints
- Chinedu Achebe, Arena Football player
- John Buccigross, ESPN anchor
- Rich Donnelly, baseball player and coach
- Tom Franckhauser, former cornerback in the National Football League
- Tom Perko, former linebacker in the National Football League
- Jon Nese, Emmy Award Winning Meteorologist, former on-air meteorologist on The Weather Channel
