= A Truce, and Other Stories =

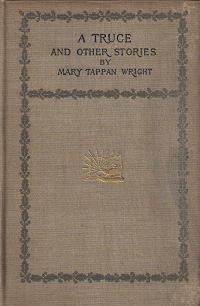
- cover of first edition
- Author: Mary Tappan Wright
- Language: English
- Genre: Short story collection
- Publisher: Charles Scribner's Sons
- Publication date: 1895
- Publication place: United States
- Media type: Print (hardcover)
- Pages: 287 pp
- Followed by: Aliens

A Truce, and Other Stories is a collection of six short stories by Mary Tappan Wright. It was first published in hardcover by Charles Scribner's Sons in 1895 and was reprinted by Fleabonnet Press, in November 2008. The stories had previously been published in Scribner's Magazine between 1890 and 1894.

This collection was the author's first published book. She went on to publish four novels and over a dozen additional short stories over the course of her writing career, though none of her other short stories were collected into book form during her lifetime.

== Contents ==
- "A Truce" (e-text from Making of America)
- "As Haggards of the Rock" (e-text from Making of America)
- "A Portion of the Tempest" (e-text from Making of America)
- "From Macedonia" (e-text from Making of America)
- "Deep as First Love" (e-text from Making of America)
- "A Fragment of a Play, with a Chorus" (e-text from Making of America)

== Reception ==
According to its review in The Bookman, "To call this volume a collection of dramatic fragments or episodes would be nearer the truth than to style these vistas of life, stories. In sculpture they resemble the torso, in music a song sometimes begun, but never ended. ... But it is this very dramatic and fragmentary form which gives her character-studies their peculiar force and charm. There is a blending of realism and romance, of comedy and tragedy, of smiles and tears which makes havoc with the reader's emotions. It is especially in her power to discern the tragedy of the commonplace, and the pleasure she takes in reducing us to a strange despair at the sorry spectacle of a relentless, ironic nemesis playing fast and loose about us, that she fascinates and holds our interest whether we will or no. Even in her humour there is a touch of impatience and sternness. We discern in her the severity and tragic fire of the Greek spirit refined and softened as it mingles with the gentleness of the woman."
