= Bochas (Hun) =

Roman military officer

Bochas (died 537) was a Hun officer of the guard under Belisarius.

He was one of the bodyguards (or bucellarii) of Belisarius. He fought for Belisarius in the Gothic War in the 530s.

He once fought against twelve Goths. They encircled him and hit him with their lances but his armor withstood their blows. One of the Goths managed to hit him from behind, piercing him. This, however, was not a mortal blow.

== Etymology ==
Ferdinand Justi listed the name as Iranian, though Otto J. Maenchen-Helfen was perplexed by such conclusion. The latter explained that Justi might've thought of "Beuca, mentioned in Getica 277 as king of the Sarmatians in southern Pannonia about 470".

It is possible that the name be of Turkic origin. Buqa (buga), literally "bull", occurs frequently in Turkic names, since early times.
