= Olivier Rayet =

French archaeologist

Olivier Rayet (23 September 1847, Le Cairou – 19 February 1887, Paris) was a French archaeologist.

From 1866 he studied geography and ancient history at the École normale supérieure in Paris, where he was a pupil of Ernest Desjardins, his future father-in-law. In 1869 he obtained his agrégation in history and became a member of the French School at Athens. From 1876 he taught classes in epigraphy and Greek archaeology at the École pratique des hautes études, and three years later, began teaching courses in ancient art at the Collège de France, succeeding Paul Foucart, a professor of epigraphy, who had recently been named director of the French School at Athens. In 1884 he succeeded François Lenormant as chair of archaeology at the Bibliothèque nationale in Paris.

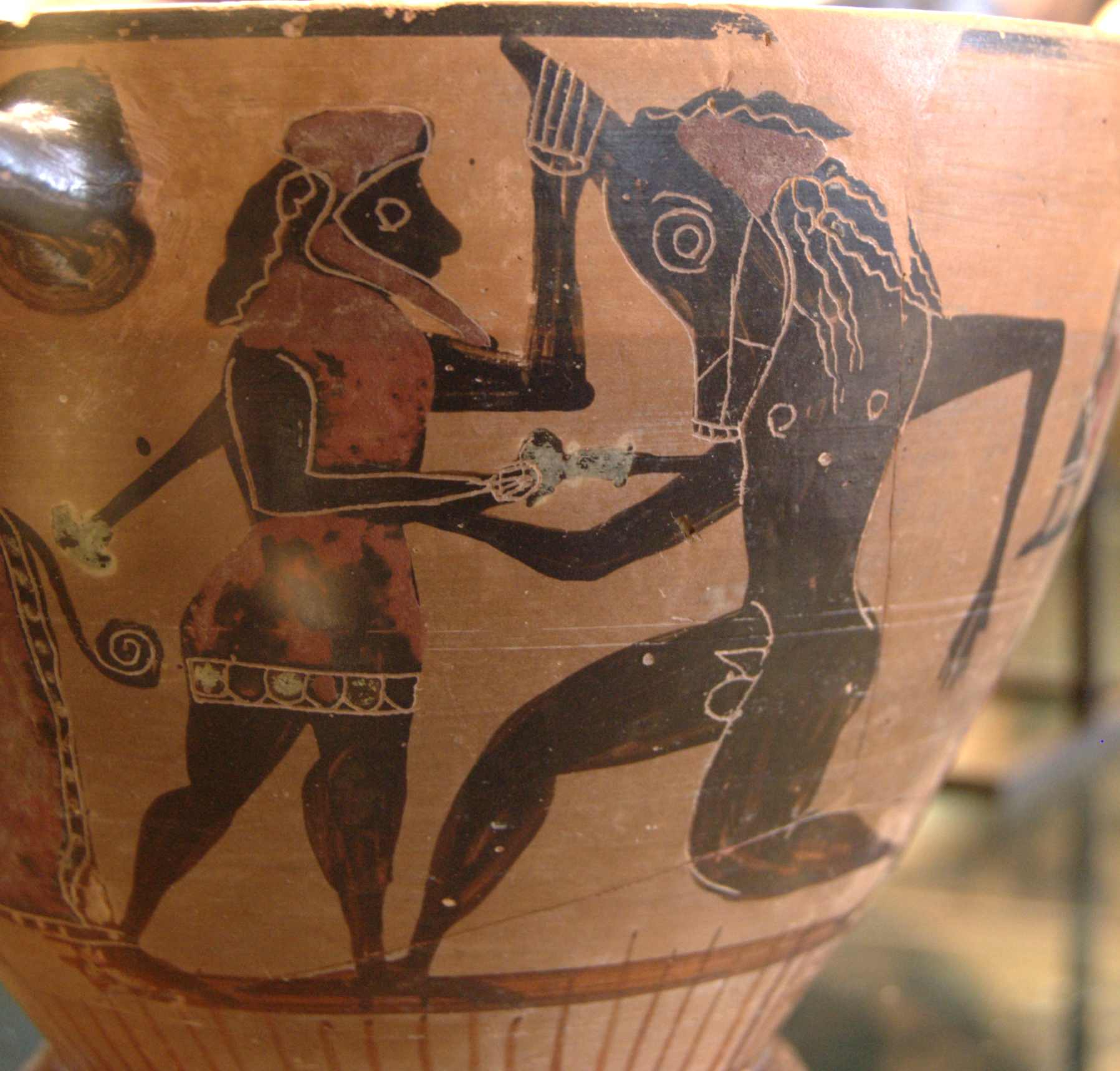
Theseus and the Minotaur (Louvre), Former collection of Olivier Rayet; purchased 1884.

In 1873 he directed excavations in Miletus and Didyma that were financed by Gustave and Edmond de Rothschild. During the 1870s, he enriched the Louvre with some of the finest early examples of Tanagra figurines.

== Published works ==
- Le temple d'Apollon Didyméen, 1876 – The Temple of Apollo (Didyma).
- Milet et le golfe Latmique, 1877–85, with Albert Thomas (2 volumes) – Miletus and the Latmian Gulf.
- Études d'archéologie et d'art, 1888, with Salomon Reinach – Studies of archaeology and art.
- Histoire de la céramique grecque, 1888, with Maxime Collignon – History of Greek ceramics.
