= Richard Hildreth =

American journalist, author and historian

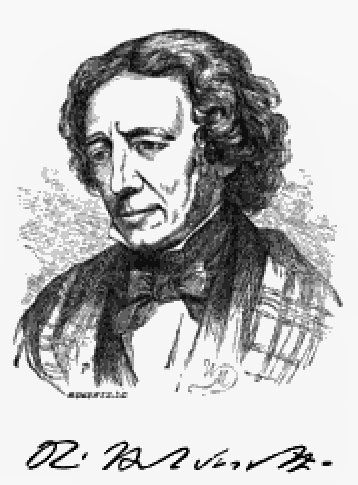
Richard Hildreth

Richard Hildreth (June 28, 1807 – July 11, 1865), was an American journalist, writer and historian. He is best known for writing his six-volume History of the United States of America covering 1497–1821 and published 1840-1853. Historians consider it a highly accurate political history of the early Republic, but with a strong bias in favor of the Federalist Party and the abolition of slavery. At the time of his death in 1865, he still had many unfinished works.

== Early life ==
Hildreth was born at Deerfield, Massachusetts. He was the son of Hosea Hildreth (1782–1835), who was a teacher of mathematics and later a Congregational minister. His mother was Sarah McLeod, who had married Hosea in 1806.

Hosea Hildreth was appointed professor of mathematics and natural philosophy at Phillips Exeter Academy in 1811, and young Richard began attending Phillips in 1816, staying for seven years thereafter. In 1826, he graduated from Harvard College. After studying law at Newburyport, he was admitted to the bar at Boston in 1830.

== Career ==
In 1832, Hildreth he became joint founder and editor of a daily newspaper, the Boston Atlas. In 1834, he wrote a popular anti-slavery novel The Slave: or Memoir of Archy Moore (1836; enlarged edition, 1852, The White Slave).

In 1837 he wrote for the Atlas a series of articles vigorously opposing the annexation of Texas. In the same year he published Banks, Banking, and Paper Currencies, a work which helped to promote the growth of the free banking system in America. In 1838 he resumed his editorial duties on the Atlas, but in 1840 removed, on account of his health, to British Guiana, where he lived for three years and was editor of two weekly newspapers in succession at Georgetown. He published in this year (1840) a volume in opposition to slavery, Despotism in America (2nd ed., 1854).

In 1849 he published the first three volumes of his History of the United States, two more volumes of which were published in 1851 and the sixth and last in 1852. The first three volumes of this history, his most important work, deal with the period 1492–1789, and the second three with the period 1789–1821. The history is notable for its painstaking accuracy and candor, as they are based on very careful analysis of the primary sources. The later volumes favor the Federalists. In dealing with the Jeffersonians, Hildreth calls them both "Republicans" and "Democrats" on the same page, but never "Democratic Republicans."

Hildreth's Japan as It Was and Is (1855) was at the time a valuable digest of the information contained in other works on that country (new ed., 1906). He also wrote a campaign biography of William Henry Harrison (1839); Theory of Morals (1844); and Theory of Politics (1853), as well as Lives of Atrocious Judges (1856), compiled from Lord Campbell's two works.

Between 1857 and 1860 Hildreth worked for the New York Tribune and during the same period he wrote several anti-slavery tracts for the fledgling Republican party under various pseudonyms. Poor health forced him to retire from his writing career in 1860. As a meed Massachusetts Governor Nathaniel Prentiss Banks and Senator Charles Sumner successfully lobbied for Hildreth's appointment as the United States consul at Trieste in 1861. In 1865 he resigned from that position and moved to Florence, where he died on July 11, 1865. He is buried near Theodore Parker in the English Cemetery, Florence

== Selected works ==
In an overview of writings by and about Hildreth, OCLC/WorldCat lists roughly 270 works in 870+ publications in 11 languages and 12,800+ library holdings.

This list is not finished; you can help Wikipedia by adding to it.

- A Report of the Trial of the Rev. Ephraim K. Avery, before the Supreme Judicial Court of Rhode Island, on an indictment for the murder of Sarah Maria Cornell. 1833
- Archy Moore, the white slave; or, Memoirs of a fugitive, 1836
- The history of banks; to which is added a demonstration of the advantages and necessity of free competition in the business of banking, 1837
- Banks, banking, and paper currencies; In three parts. I. History of banking and paper money. II. Argument for open competition in banking. III. Apology for One-Dollar notes. 1840
- Theory of morals an inquiry concerning the law of moral distinctions and the variations and contradictions of ethical codes, 1844
- Theory of politics; an inquiry into the foundations of governments and the causes and progress of political revolutions. 1853
- Despotism in America: an inquiry into the nature, results, and legal basis of the slave-holding system in the United States, 1854

=== The History of the United States of America, in six volumes ===
- Hildreth, Richard (1856). The history of the United States of America : from the discovery of the continent to the organization of government under the federal constitution. Vol. I. New York : Harper & Bros.
- Hildreth, Richard (1849). The history of the United States of America : from the discovery of the continent to the organization of government under the federal constitution. Vol. II. New York : Harper & Bros.
- Hildreth, Richard (1856). The history of the United States of America : from the discovery of the continent to the organization of government under the federal constitution. Vol. III. New York : Harper & Bros.
- Hildreth, Richard (1856). The history of the United States of America : from the discovery of the continent to the organization of government under the federal constitution. Vol. IV. New York : Harper & Bros.
- Hildreth, Richard (1856). The history of the United States of America : from the discovery of the continent to the organization of government under the federal constitution. Vol. V. New York : Harper & Bros.
- Hildreth, Richard (1856). The history of the United States of America : from the discovery of the continent to the organization of government under the federal constitution. Vol. VI. New York : Harper & Bros.
- Japan as it was and is, 1855
