= Hosea Hildreth =

Educator and minister

Hosea Hildreth (January 2, 1782 – 1835) was an educator and minister in Massachusetts and New Hampshire.

Born in 1782 in Massachusetts, he graduated from Harvard College in 1805.

His son, Richard Hildreth was born in Deerfield, Massachusetts in 1807, where Hosea Hildreth was the ninth head of school at Deerfield Academy.

He taught mathematics at Phillips Exeter Academy from 1811 to 1825.

As minister of the First Church of Gloucester, he was, according to his son, the last Congregationalist minister ordained by a mixed group of Unitarian and orthodox Congregationalists, when he was called to the pulpit in 1825. He was also notable as the last Congregationalist pastor to exchange pulpits with both Unitarian and orthodox pastors. This practice and his sympathies eventually led to his expulsion from the Essex Association.
