= Aliens (Tappan Wright novel) =

1902 novel by Mary Tappan Wright

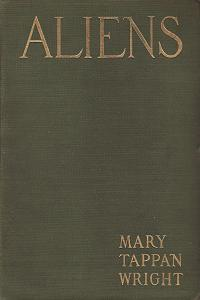
- cover of first edition
- Author: Mary Tappan Wright
- Language: English
- Publisher: Charles Scribner's Sons
- Publication date: 1902
- Publication place: United States
- Media type: Print (hardcover)
- Pages: 424 pp
- Preceded by: A Truce, and Other Stories
- Followed by: The Test

Aliens is a novel by Mary Tappan Wright. It was first published in hardcover by Charles Scribner's Sons in March, 1902. It was Wright's first published novel and second published book. It was reprinted by Kessinger Publishing, LLC, in June, 2007.

== Reception ==
According to its review in The New York Times, the novel presents "a wonderfully graphic picture of the South as it is to-day. A picture vivid with the descriptions of the violent antagonisms which still sway that unhappy region, pathetic in the portrayal of the misery of the negroes, and full of charm in the lovely pictures of the soft beauty of the Southern savannahs. ... No one can read the book without learning much of the beautiful and unhappy South land, of which most Northerners are ignorant ..."
