= Lewis Northey Tappan =

American abolitionist and politician

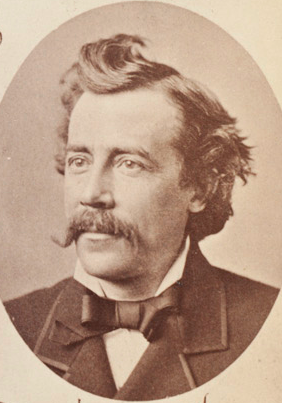
Lewis Northey Tappan, c.1877

Lewis Northey Tappan (June 15, 1831 – February 25, 1880) was an abolitionist, politician, and Colorado pioneer and entrepreneur. He was son of Colonel Ebenezer Tappan, a manufacturer and State Legislator of the prominent Tappan family of Massachusetts. He was also a first cousin once removed of abolitionists and philanthropists Lewis Tappan and Arthur Tappan, and their brother and U. S. Senator Benjamin Tappan of Ohio.

Born in Manchester, Massachusetts, and initially involved in business in Boston, Tappan went to Kansas in 1857 to join his cousin, Samuel Forster Tappan (1831–1913), who was already heavily involved in the Free-State movement as clerk of the Topeka Constitutional Convention and later, acting Speaker of the State House of Representatives. Tappan became Secretary of the Senate under the Topeka Constitution and one of the Fort Scott Treaty Commissioners.

Tappan was one of the fifteen armed men who went to Lecompton to recover the infamous candle box containing fraudulent election returns, the discovery of which caused the downfall of the Kansas pro-slavery party.

In 1859, Tappan moved to Kansas Territory (in an area that would become part of Colorado Territory in 1861) where he joined the first city government of Denver, built its first frame building with his brother George Hooper Tappan (1833–1865), and operated the first store in the territory. He was further involved in territory politics as a member of Governor Gilpin's council and as a staff member to Governor Cummings. In the summer of 1860, the two brothers opened their store after constructing the first frame building in the town—two stories high. He was a member of the city government of Denver and organized the first Sunday School there.

Coming to the Pike's Peak region in 1859, Lewis N. Tappan, along with several other town promoters, met in Denver City and organized the Colorado City Town Company on August 11, 1859, founding Colorado City on August 12. A few days later, on August 15, 1859, Tappan and many of the same eager town promoters organized the El Paso Claim Club, a vigilante form of civil government, to record real estate claims and settle land disputes. Tappan not only became the Town Company's director, secretary, and treasurer, but he also became the Claim Club's director, secretary, and recorder. Colorado City is now a national historic district within Colorado Springs, where he operated a general and mining supplies store. Although Lewis Tappan was active within the business community of Colorado City and El Paso County, Tappan still found time to explore the surrounding area. In 1859, Tappan, Anthony Bott, George Bute, Melancthon S. Beach, A.D. Richardson, several people from Golden City, and several women hiked to the summit of Pikes Peak, taking several days. At the summit, the hikers found evidence of others having reached the summit. Records indicate the members of the Lawrence, Kansas, prospecting party hiked to the summit in the summer of 1858.

Tappan was one of the first 3 white men to enter the region known as "Garden of the Gods", which they named. The name of the park goes back to August 1859. Several surveyors including Lewis N. Tappan, who would later discover a lead mine in Quartz valley, explored the area. Upon discovering the site, one of the surveyors, Melancthon S. Beach, said it would be a "capital place for a beer garden." His companion, Rufus Cable, who was awestruck by the impressive rock formations, replied, "Beer Garden! Why it is a fit place for the gods to assemble. We will call it the Garden of the Gods." As with other early entrepreneurs in Colorado City, Lewis N. Tappan and his brother, George H. Tappan, owned and operated a general store in Colorado City, "Tappan & Co.", along with their first store in Denver and another in Golden. They were also assisted by their brother William Henry Tappan (1821–1907).

In 1866, Tappan married Elizabeth Sanford, daughter of Giles Sanford of Albany, New York Lewis returned to Manchester and was elected to the Mass. legislature in 1877. He was a prominent real estate developer in Manchester and maintained homes both there and in Boston. Making several trips across the Great Plains, he became active in mining in Leadville, CO, discovering a lead mine and building the first smelting works in the territory. Following a tragic accident he witnessed when a guest of his fell to his death in a shaft while touring with Lewis, he went into shock and never recovered from it. Lewis Tappan died of nervous prostration in 1880. Three children survived him: Lewis Hooper Tappan, Sanford Tappan, and Blanche Tappan. He was at the time of his death a member of the Claridon Street Church in Boston.

== See also ==
- 1877 Massachusetts legislature
