= Lucy Myers Wright Mitchell =

American archaeologist, historian, and missionary (1845–1888)

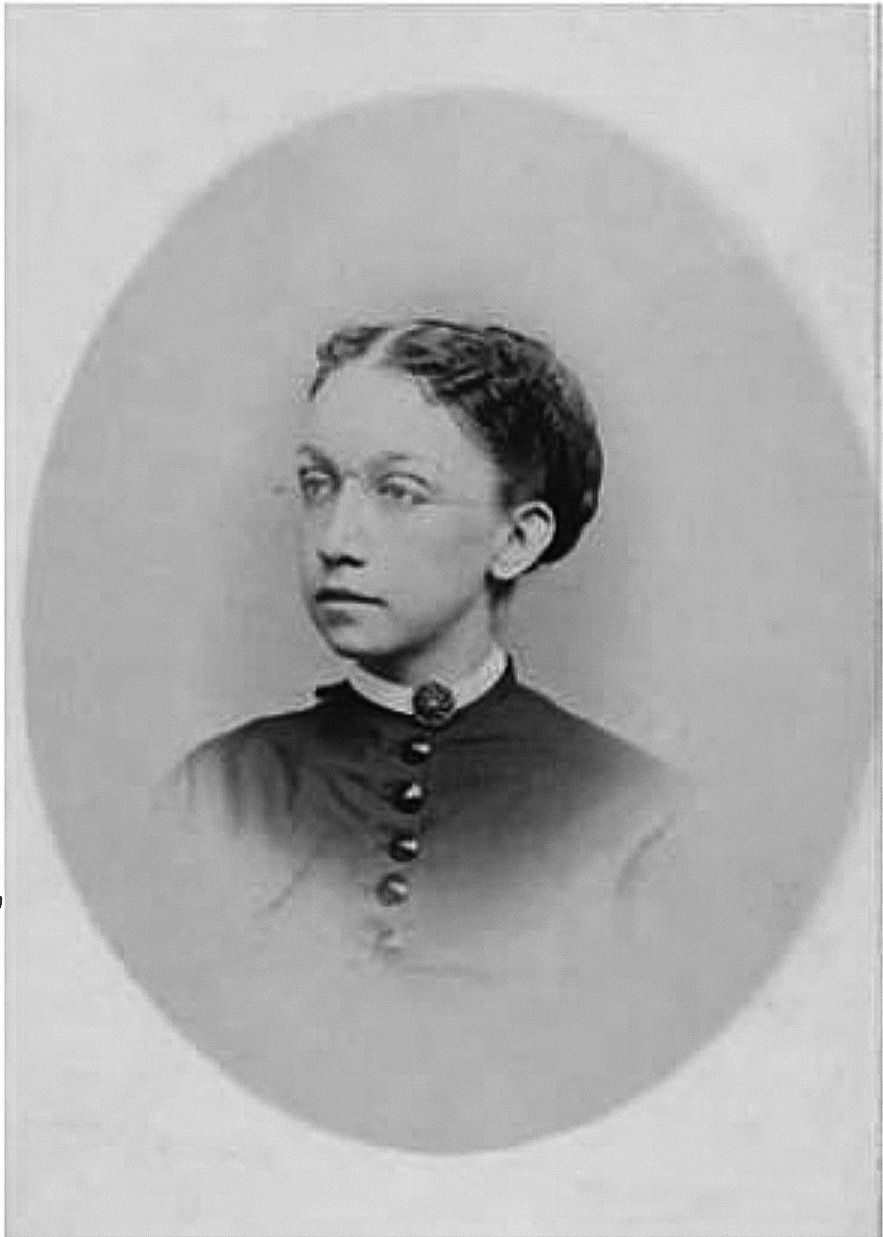
- Mitchell in 1867
- Born: Lucy Myers Wright; March 20, 1845; Urumiah, Persia
- Died: March 10, 1888 (aged 42); Lausanne, Switzerland
- Occupations: Archaeologist; historian; missionary

Academic background
- Education: Mount Holyoke College (left 1864, no degree)
- Influences: Johannes Overbeck

Academic work
- Institutions: Art Institute of Chicago; Imperial German Archaeological Institute
- Notable works: A History of Ancient Sculpture (1883)

Lucy Myers Wright Mitchell (née Lucy Myers Wright; March 20, 1845 – March 10, 1888) was an American classical archaeologist, historian, and missionary who studied ancient art. Mitchell was the first American to publish a book on classical sculpture and was one of the first women to study the field of classical archaeology.

== Biography ==
Mitchell was born on March 20, 1845, in Urumiah, Persia. Her parents were missionaries of the Nestorian Christians in Persia (now called the Assyrian Church of the East in Iran), Catherine Myers Wright and Austin Hazen Wright, a Dartmouth College alumnus. She is the sister of classical scholar John Henry Wright. Mitchell attended Mount Holyoke Female Seminary (now Mount Holyoke College) and left in 1864 with no degree when she was chosen to accompany her father on his return to his mission in Persia. After his death in 1865, she left missionary life. She married Samuel S. Mitchell, who studied language and art, in 1867, and they would live in Lebanon and Germany before returning to Massachusetts. Her two-volume, 766 page work, A History of Ancient Sculpture, begins with its origins in Ancient Egypt in the first volume, and includes Selections of Ancient Sculpture, a second volume of plates. Classical archaeologist Stephen L. Dyson calls Mitchell's work "the first general American text on ancient art".

== Bibliography ==
- A History of Ancient Sculpture (1883) Download. View
- Selections of Ancient Sculpture (1883)

== See also ==
- Ersilia Caetani-Lovatelli
