= Maxime Collignon =

French archaeologist

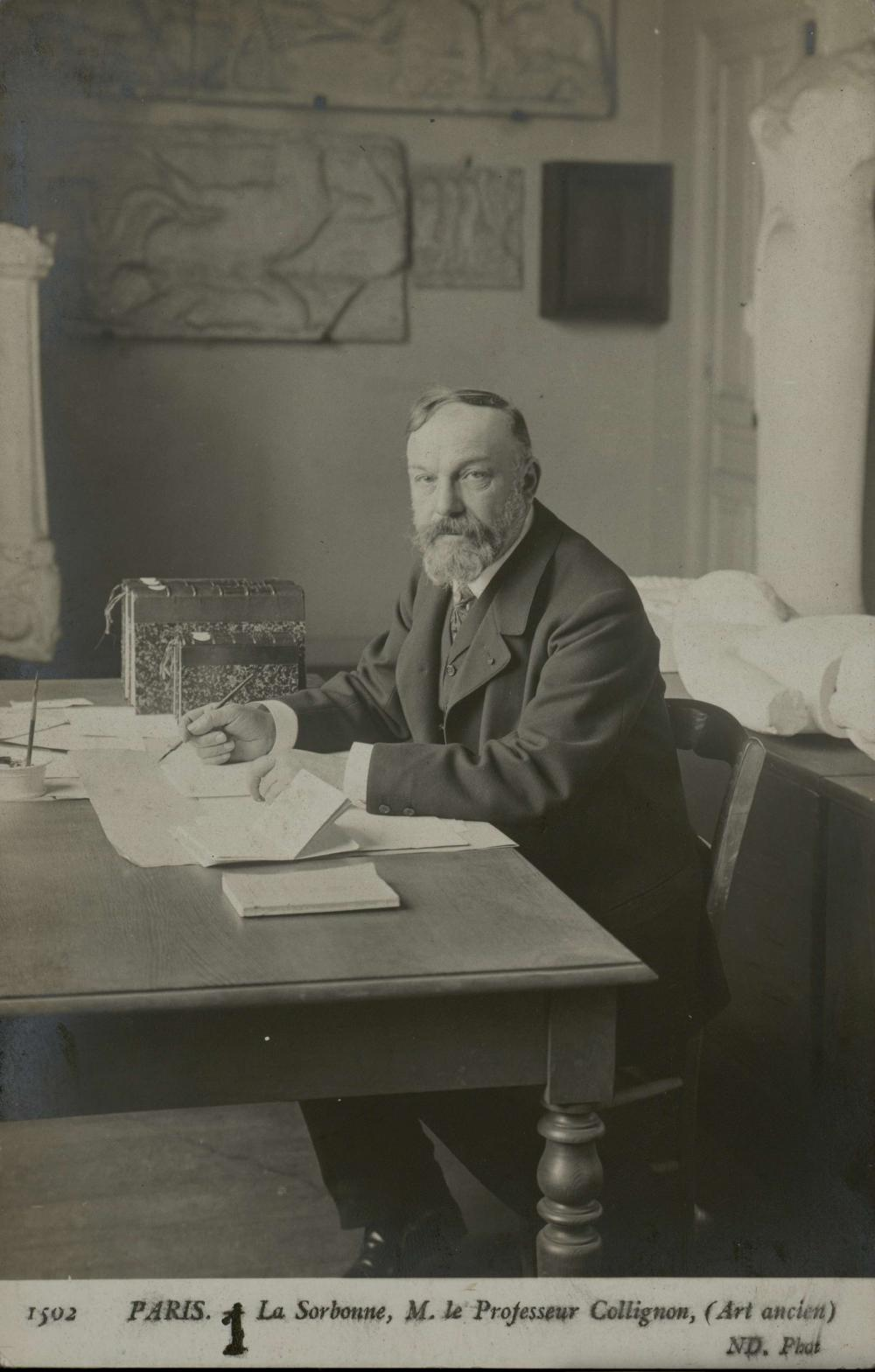

Léon-Maxime Collignon (8 November 1849 in Verdun – 15 October 1917 in Paris) was a French archaeologist who specialized in ancient Greek art and architecture.

== Biography ==
From 1868 he studied at the École normale supérieure in Paris as a student of archaeologist Georges Perrot. In 1873 he became a member of the French School at Athens. In 1876, with Louis Duchesne, he conducted archaeological research in Asia Minor, about which, he published "Rapport sur un voyage archéologique en Asie Mineure". In 1879 he was named professor of Greek antiquities at the University of Bordeaux. In 1883 he returned to Paris as a deputy to Georges Perrot at the Faculty of Arts, where in 1900 he became a full professor of archaeology.

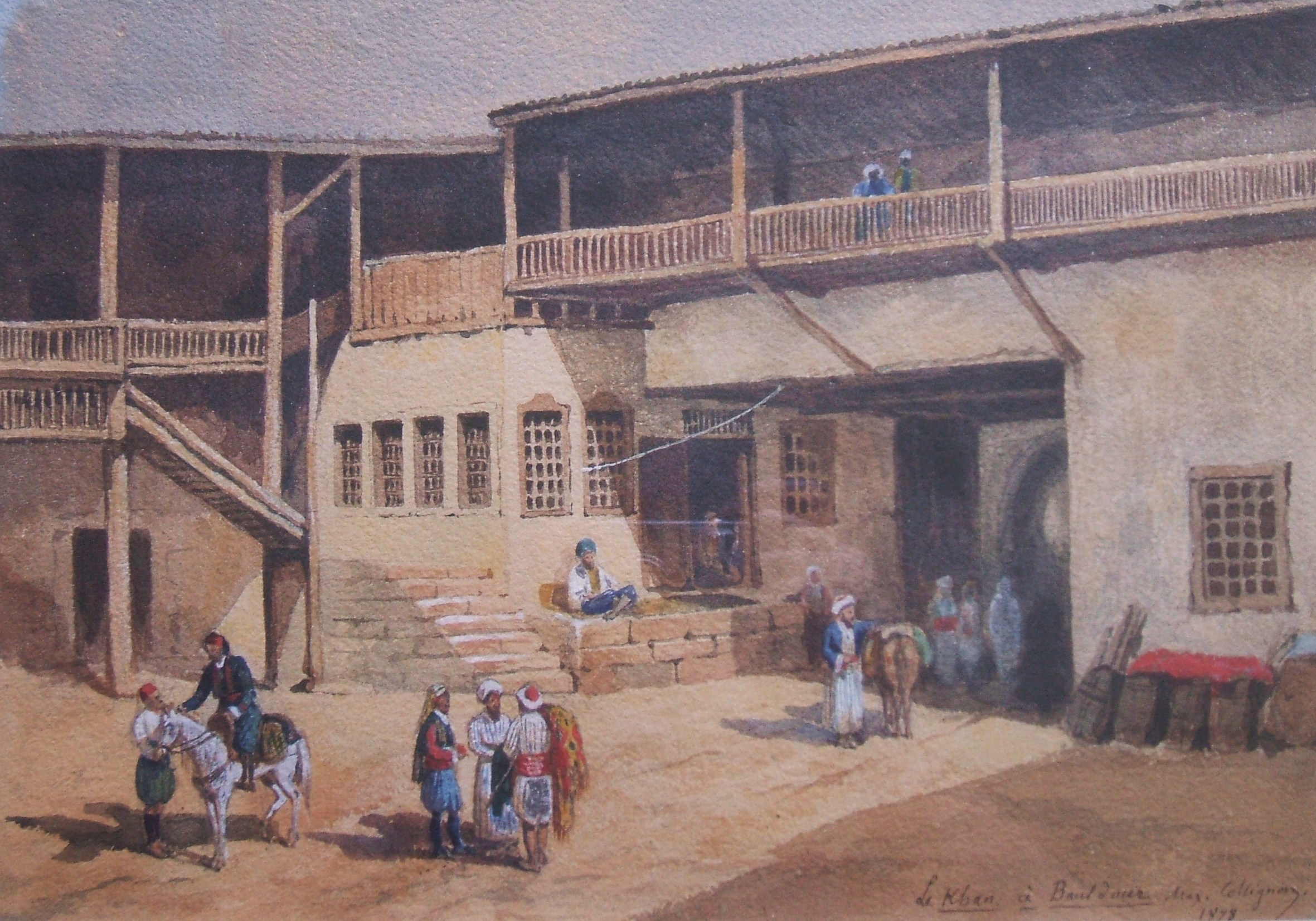
"Le khan à Bouldour" (in Pisidia, Anatolia); illustration by Maxime Collignon (1878).

In 1893 he became a member of the Académie des Inscriptions et Belles-Lettres, of which, in 1904 he was elected as its president. In 1907 while sorting through art objects in a storage room at the museum in Auxerre, he discovered the so-called "Lady of Auxerre", a unique statuette dating to the times of Archaic Greece. How the sculpture got to Auxerre remains to this day a mystery.

== Published works ==
His 1883 book on Greek archaeology, "Manuel d'archéologie grecque" was translated into English by John Henry Wright and published as "A manual of Greek archæology" (1886). In 1890 Jane Ellen Harrison translated and published Collignon's "Mythologie figurée de la Grèce" (1883) as "Manual of mythology in relation to Greek art". He was also the author of writings associated with archaeological digs that he participated in at Pergamon and Delphi. The following are some of his principal works in the fields of Greek art and architecture:

- Essai sur les monuments grecs et romains relatifs au mythe de Psyché, 1877 – On Greek and Roman monuments relative to the myth of Psyche.
- Phidias, 1886 – treatise on Phidias.
- Histoire de la céramique grecque, 1888 (with Olivier Rayet) – History of Greek ceramics.
- Histoire de la sculpture grecque, 1892-97 (2 volumes) – History of Greek sculpture.
- Catalogue des vases peints du Musée national d'Athènes, 1902–04, (3 parts, with Louis Couve) – Catalogue of painted vases in the National Museum at Athens.
- Scopas et Praxitèle, la sculpture grecque au IVe siècle jusqu'au temps d'Alexandre, 1907 – Scopas and Praxiteles, Greek sculpture of the 4th century up until the time of Alexander.
- L'archéologie grecque, 1907 – Greek archaeology.
- Le Parthénon; l'histoire, l'architecture et la sculpture, 1911 – The Parthenon; its history, architecture and sculpture.
- Les statues funéraires dans l'art grec, 1911 – Funerary statues in Greek art.
