= Geopiety =

Worship of the powers behind nature

Geopiety is "the belief and worship of powers behind nature or the human environment". It was coined by the American geographer John Kirtland Wright to refer to geographical piety.

The term "geopiety" comes from a combination of the Greek root geo, for earth, and the Latin root "pietas". As Wright explained when coining the term, geopiety is meant to refer to "emotional piety aroused by awareness of terrestrial diversity of the kind of which geography is also a form of awareness".

One example of geopiety can be found in the works of American preacher Jonathan Edwards:

He that is traveling up a very high mountain, if he goes on climbing, will at length get to that height and eminence as at last not only to have his prospect vastly large, but he will get above clouds and winds, and where he will enjoy a perpetual serenity and calm. This may encourage Christians constantly and steadfastly to climb the Christian hill. That high towers or other high places are commonly smitten with thunder, and mountainous places more subject to terrible thunder and lightning, shows how that pride and self-exaltation does particularly excite God's wrath.

== See also ==
- Religion and geography

== Bibliography ==
- Edwards, Jonathan (1948). Perry Miller (ed.). Images or shadows of divine things. Westport, Connecticut: Greenwood Press. ISBN 0-8371-6952-6.
- Wright, John Kirtland (1966). Human Nature in Geography: Fourteen Papers, 1925-1965. Cambridge, Massachusetts: Harvard University Press.
