= Boston Atlas =

Newspaper in Boston, Massachusetts

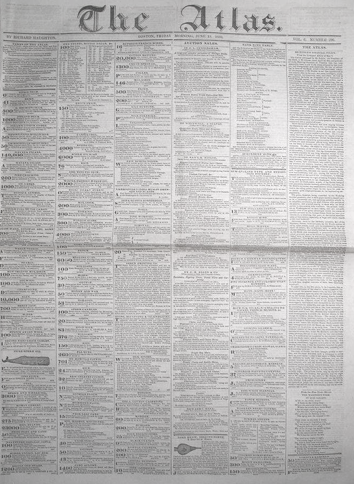
The Atlas, Boston, 1838

The Boston Atlas (1832–1857) newspaper of Boston, Massachusetts, was published in daily and semi-weekly editions in the mid-19th century. John H. Eastburn established the paper in 1832. Editors included Richard Hildreth, Richard Haughton, William Hayden, Thomas M. Brewer, William Schouler, R. Carter. Among the contributors: Joseph Carter Abbott, Benjamin Perley Poore, Samuel F. Tappan. Its office stood at no.18 State Street and later in the Old State House. The paper supported the Whig Party. Its Democratic rival, with which it sparred constantly, was The Boston Post. In 1857 the Boston Traveller absorbed The Atlas.

== Variant titles ==
Daily edition

- Boston Daily Atlas, 1832-1834, 1844-1857
- The Daily Atlas, 1834-1837
- The Atlas, 1837-1840

Semiweekly

- Boston Atlas, 1833-1834
- The Atlas, 1834-1840
- The Semi-Weekly Atlas, 1841-1844
- The Boston Semi-Weekly Atlas, 1844-1857

== Images ==
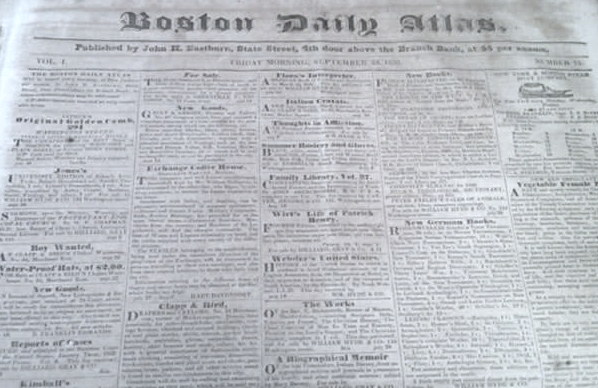
Boston Daily Atlas, 1832

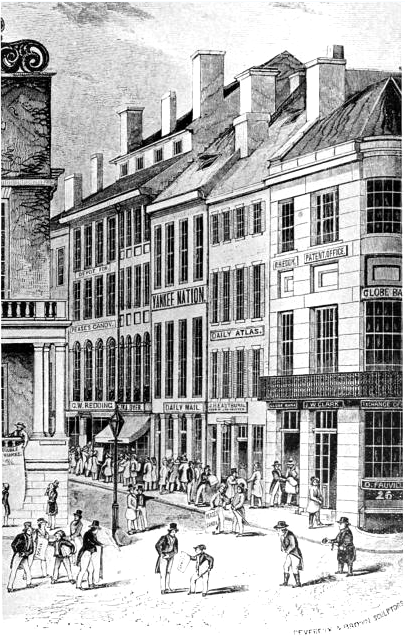
Daily Atlas office, State Street, ca.1840s

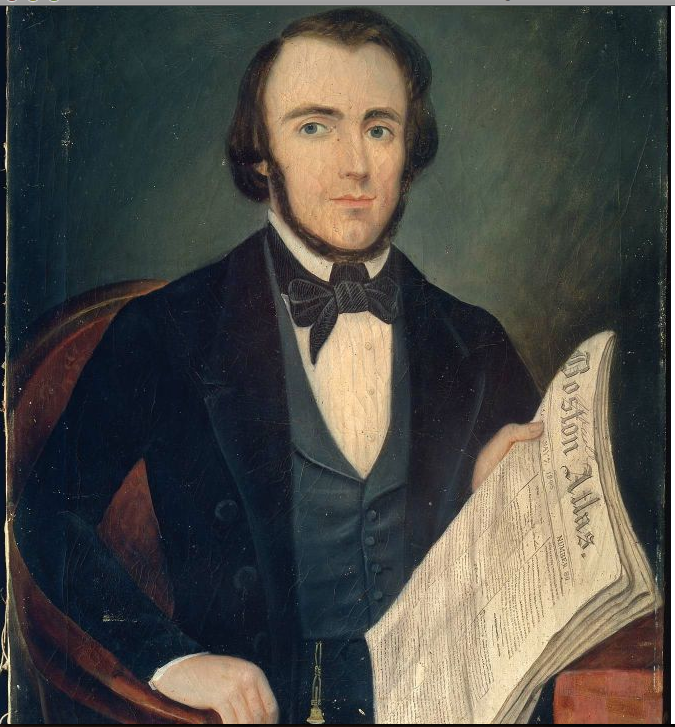
Portrait of a Boston Atlas reader, 1845, by an unidentified artist (Museum of Fine Arts, Boston)
