= Samuel F. Tappan =

American journalist and military officer

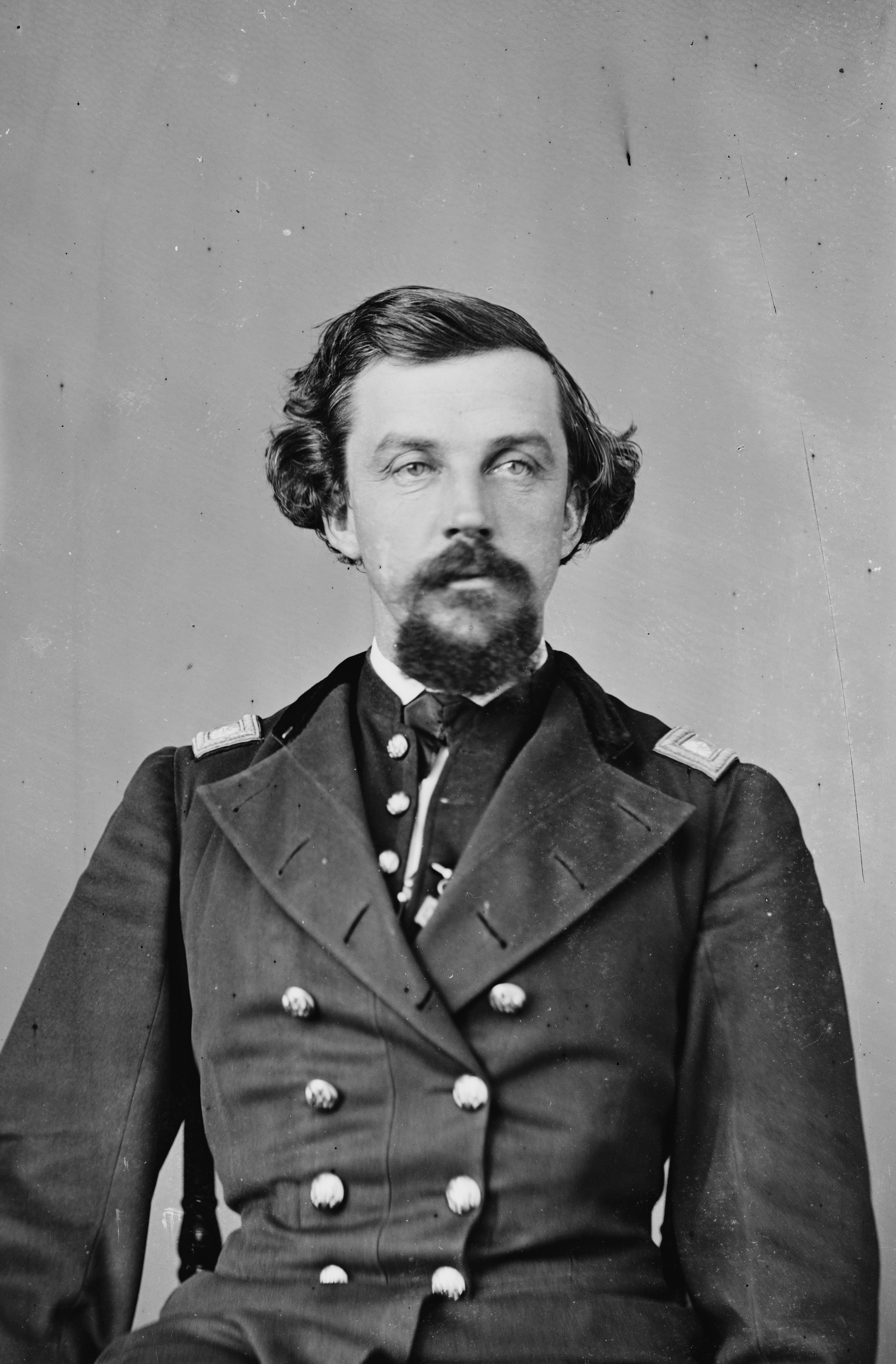
Tappan, c. 1865

Samuel Forster Tappan (June 29, 1831 – January 6, 1913) was an American journalist, military officer, abolitionist and a Native American rights activist. Appointed as a member of the Indian Peace Commission in 1867 to reach peace with the Plains Indians, he advocated self-determination for native tribes. He proposed the federal government replace military jurisdiction over tribal matters with a form of civil law on reservations, applied by the tribes themselves.

== Early life and family ==
Samuel Tappan, a native of Manchester, Massachusetts, near Boston was a member of the prominent New England Tappan family. It included clergymen, politicians, merchants, sea captains, cabinet-makers, inventors, poets, philanthropists, educators, and abolitionists. He was a first cousin once removed of the noted brothers Arthur Tappan (1786–1865) and Lewis Tappan (1788–1873) who were silk merchants in New York; they were known as philanthropists and abolitionists, as well as their eldest brother, Senator Benjamin Tappan (1773–1857) of Ohio, who mentored Edwin M. Stanton, later Secretary of War under Abraham Lincoln.

Sam Tappan received a common school education and then went to work in the cabinet-making trade in his native town, learning to make chairs from his father. He next worked in Boston at an uncle's clothing store.

== Abolitionist activity ==
While in Boston, Tappan was disturbed by the fate of fugitive slaves who were caught pursuant to the Fugitive Slave Act of 1850 and returned to servile labor. Tappan was encouraged in his abolitionism by family members and prominent men, who included Wendell Phillips, William Lloyd Garrison, Theodore Parker, and others. In May 1854, the capture of the slave Anthony Burns in Boston and forced return by US Marshals stirred a fierce reaction among Boston's abolitionists. Crowds lined the street to protest his being shipped back to slavery in the South. This event may have inspired Tappan to take personal action following passage of the Kansas-Nebraska Act.

At the age of 23, Tappan was one of a group of 29 New England settlers who came to found what later became Lawrence, Kansas, in August 1854 as part of the New England Emigrant Aid Company's "pioneer party". They were trying to arrange for anti-slavery advocates to settle in Kansas before the vote on whether it should be free or a slave state. He staked a claim to land that abutted the claim of the homeopathic physician Dr. John Doy, formerly of Rochester, New York. He was also a correspondent for Horace Greeley's New York Tribune and did some writing for the Boston Atlas and several other newspapers, reporting on the territory's first difficulties with border raiders. As an active abolitionist, he covered the antislavery movement in the Kansas Territory, including reports dealing with the armed and sometimes deadly conflicts between the territory's Pro-Slavery advocates and those aligned with the Free-State movement. Tappan was also actively involved in the Underground Railroad, moving slaves through Kansas to northern states. He also participated in 1855 in Jacob Branson's rescue during the short-lived Wakarusa War.

Tappan became active in the volatile political activity in the territory. In 1855, accompanied by political activist Martin F. Conway, he traveled through southern and western Kansas, speaking in favor of the free-state movement. He also maintained close ties to both the Kansas-based and East Coast leadership of the New England Emigrant Aid Company and participated in helping to smuggle arms (nicknamed "Beecher's Bibles") and other assistance to Free-Soil settlers. Tappan was clerk of the Topeka constitutional convention, assistant clerk of the House of Representatives in 1856, and the following year performed the duties of Speaker of the Topeka House of Representatives. He was secretary of the Leavenworth constitutional convention in 1858, and acted as clerk of the Wyandotte convention in 1859. His first cousin, Lewis N. Tappan, also emigrated to Kansas in 1857, and was Secretary of the Senate under the Topeka Constitution. Lewis Tappan was one of the Fort Scott Treaty Commissioners. Both Lewis and Sam were among the 15 armed men who captured the box containing the altered election returns at Lecompton, the discovery of which resulted in the overthrow of the pro-slavery party in Kansas.

In 1860, Tappan relocated as a "Pike's Peaker" to the settlement that became Denver, Colorado. This move was part of a business arrangement involving his cousin Lewis N. Tappan and the then relatively unknown Henry Villard, who had both preceded him to the gold fields by a year. Sam Tappan worked as a journalist for the Daily Herald and became involved in gold and other mineral exploration and township settlement. His cousins Lewis N. Tappan (1831–1880), George H. Tappan (1833–1865), joined later in 1865 by William H. Tappan (1821–1907), operated Tappan & Co, one of the first general stores serving Colorado miners, with branches in Denver, Colorado City, Golden, and Central City.

== Civil War ==
=== Enlistment ===
With the outbreak of the Civil War in 1861, Tappan received a commission from Colorado's Territorial Governor William Gilpin to help raise a regiment of Union volunteer troops. Commissioned initially as a captain, his success in recruitment drives in the small Colorado mining towns of Black Hawk, Georgetown, Golden, and Central City resulted in his being promoted by Gilpin to Lieutenant Colonel of the newly formed First Colorado Volunteer Regiment, serving under Colonel John P. Slough, a lawyer from Cincinnati, Ohio. After helping train the regiment at Camp Weld near Denver, Tappan was placed in command of Fort Wise with a detachment of the regiment until news arrived of the invasion of New Mexico Territory by Confederates from Texas.

=== Service in New Mexico Territory ===
Tappan and his charges joined the hurried movement of the First Colorado Volunteers to reinforce Fort Union in New Mexico in early March 1862, and later saw action against the Confederate troops along the Santa Fe Trail in New Mexico. Tappan participated in the second day of the Battle of Glorieta Pass on March 28, 1862, at Pigeon's Ranch. Tappan was the effective field commander of the Federal forces during the main engagement that day, and was exposed to enemy fire while Colonel Slough directed the Federal activity from the rear. Tappan's actions that day were eventually overshadowed by the later success of the one-third of Slough's command that bypassed the Confederate lines and attacked and destroyed the enemy wagon train and supplies in their rear near Johnson's Ranch. Commanded by Major John M. Chivington, a former Methodist minister, who had also commanded the advance Union force which tangled with and defeated an advance Confederate unit on March 27 at Apache Canyon, this Union detachment effectively ended the threat posed by the Confederate invaders by destroying their supplies and ammunition stores.

When Slough resigned as colonel a few days after the victory at Glorieta Pass, Tappan was the ranking officer and acting colonel. Although later recognized by both Col. Edward R. S. Canby, Commander of the Department of New Mexico, and Col. Christopher "Kit" Carson of the First New Mexico Volunteers for his sound military abilities, Tappan voluntarily relinquished his seniority rights and joined in signing a petition from among the men of the First Colorado to elevate Chivington, the recent hero of the Glorieta battle, to colonel. Chivington's promotion to Colonel where he outranked Tappan would eventually produce friction between the two as Chivington viewed Tappan as a rival whom he sought to discredit. Tappan participated in action at Peralta on April 15, 1862, as the Union troops pursued the retreating Confederate forces under Brig. Gen. Henry Hopkins Sibley southward back towards Texas. Tappan, with the rest of the First Colorado, remained in New Mexico billeted at Fort Craig, serving under Canby well into the summer of 1862.

=== Return to Colorado ===
After an act of perceived insubordination in 1863, Tappan was relegated by Chivington to the command of Fort Garland, a command in a remote part of southern Colorado near the traditional lands of the Ute and containing a large Hispanic population. During his command of Fort Garland, he was assigned by Governor John Evans and Colonel Chivington to hunt down the Espinosa brothers, brigands and murderers who killed 32 Colorado citizens in cold blood and engaged in rape, robbery and other destructive acts. A $2500 reward had been offered by Governor Evans for the capture either dead or alive of the Espinosas. Employing the services of noted mountain man, Indian scout and tracker Tom Tobin, Tappan assigned a group of troopers to accompany Tobin and track down the Espinosas. On the fourth day, Tobin tracked down the Espinosas and killed the two brothers, bringing their severed heads back to Tappan as proof of his success. When Tappan forwarded the trophies to Denver, Chivington used the opportunity to lambast Tappan for such "unchristian" behavior despite the common use at the time of such methods. Tappan also paid Tobin from his own pocket when Governor Evans failed to pay the full reward he was owed. Years later as a matter of personal honor, Tappan sponsored an effort to make restitution to an aged and penniless Tobin.

In 1864, Tappan's father died in Massachusetts and, after numerous queries to Chivington, Tappan was finally granted his first leave of the war. He returned home to help comfort his mother and sisters and then traveled to Washington, D.C. where he had many connections in the military hierarchy. His cousin Elizabeth Tappan Tannatt's (sister of his Colorado cousins' Lewis, William and George Tappan) husband, Col. Thomas R. Tannatt commanded the First Massachusetts Heavy Artillery in the city's defenses and John P. Slough, his former Colonel in the First Colorado, had been appointed a Brigadier General and was the Military Governor of Alexandria and commander of the fortifications at Fort Ward near Alexandria, Virginia. Edward R. S. Canby had also been promoted to Brigadier General following the successful defense of New Mexico against the Confederate invasion and transferred to Washington, D.C., where he served as Assistant Adjutant General and military aide to Secretary of War Edwin M. Stanton. Tappan met personally with General Ulysses S. Grant and received an invitation from Grant to visit his field command at City Point, Virginia, where he spent several weeks before returning to Colorado.

Tappan returned to Colorado in November 1864 and was laid up at Fort Lyon, Colorado Territory with a broken foot incurred on the eve of his arrival. This was two days before elements of the First Colorado Cavalry, together with the 100 day soldiers of the Third Colorado Cavalry, under the command of Colonel Chivington, initiated an attack on a peaceful encampment of Southern Cheyenne and Arapaho Indians at Sand Creek. The attack, involving 675 cavalry troopers, originated at daybreak on November 29, 1864, who departed from Fort Lyon at 8 pm on November 28 following an argument between Chivington and some of the officers at the fort who tried to dissuade Chivington from making the attack. There was a general understanding with the Cheyenne and Arapaho Indians encamped on Sand Creek that they were under the protection of the Federal troops at Fort Lyon pursuant to an agreement reached that Fall with the then Commander of the fort, Major Edward W. Wynkoop. It is not known if Tappan played any part in the discussions with Chivington at Fort Lyon on November 28 before the attack. The Federal troopers under Chivington's command attacked the Indian villages at first light and killed 150-200 Indians, two-thirds of whom were women and children. The Federal troops lost ten soldiers and had 38 wounded (of whom four later died while at Ft. Lyon), some of the casualties apparently arising from friendly fire and disorder among the cooperating units. Some of the victorious troopers mutilated the bodies of their Indian victims and returned to Denver where these grisly battle souvenirs (including tobacco pouches made from the severed genitals of the victims) were proudly and publicly displayed to the citizens of Denver. The action at Sand Creek was greeted by citizens of Denver as a justifiable military victory which helped to avenge the murders of Plains settlers such as the Hungate family. However it eventually began to be seen in the nation at-large as an unjustifiable massacre of peaceful Indians under Peace Chiefs such as Chief Black Kettle of the Southern Cheyenne Tribe.

Tappan was appointed to head the military commission that investigated Colonel Chivington for his role in the action at Sand Creek. After testifying to Tappan and his fellow Commissioners at the inquiry against Chivington held in Denver, Capt. Silas Soule, a fellow Kansas pioneer and abolitionist, was killed by Charles W. Squires, another of the Colorado volunteers, presumably for his testimony against Chivington. Lieutenant Joseph Cramer and Major Wynkoop also testified against Chivington at the inquiry at which Tappan presided. The investigation produced a report that was shared with the Military command as well as the US Congress. Two separate Congressional investigations were also undertaken of the events at Sand Creek both of which excoriated Chivington's actions. Chivington was never punished as he had been mustered out of the service in January 1865 prior to the initiation of the investigative military commission. Tappan was later brevetted to the rank of Colonel before he was mustered out of the army at the end of the Civil War. During his service in the First Colorado Cavalry, elements of the regiment also joined the New Mexico Volunteers in campaigns against various Plains tribes, including the Kiowa, Comanche, and Apache.

== Native American rights activities ==
Both as a military officer and a civilian, Tappan was involved in negotiations and treaties between Native Americans and the United States government. While serving at Fort Garland, Tappan commented on the enslavement of Navajos by both the Utes and Mexicans, and sought official support to try to end the practice. He acted as witness to the treaty executed on October 7, 1863, at Conejos between the Tabeguache band of Utes under Ouray and the US government represented by Colorado Territory's Governor Evans, New Mexico Territory's Indian Superintendent Dr. Michael Steck, Indian agents Simeon Whiteley and Lafayette Head, and President Lincoln's personal representative John G. Nicolay. Tappan was later appointed by President Andrew Johnson in July 1867, pursuant to an act of the US Congress, to serve as a member of the Indian Peace Commission along with Generals William Tecumseh Sherman, William S. Harney, Alfred H. Terry, and C. C. Augur and several prominent civilians. The Commission negotiated with several tribes in the Plains during 1867–1868, as well as other native tribes in the Southwest. In Kansas, on October 21, 1867, the group negotiated the Medicine Lodge Treaty with the tribes of the Southern plain. He and Gen. Sherman were the two commission members who finalized the Treaty of Bosque Redondo that was signed with the Navajo Nation on June 1, 1868, at Fort Sumner, New Mexico, that ended the Bosque Redondo reservation fiasco. Tappan met several times with President Johnson and General Grant during his service with the commission, as well as many members of Congress.

During his service with the commission, Tappan also recruited the young and relatively inexperienced Henry Morton Stanley, later the famed African explorer and author, first as a clerk to cover the commission's work and later recommended that he be hired as a correspondent to file dispatches with major newspapers. Through this work, Stanley came to the attention of James Gordon Bennett, Jr. of the New York Herald, who later sent him to Africa in search of Dr. David Livingstone. Tappan also developed a lifelong friendship with the pioneer, buffalo hunter, Indian agent, illustrator and prominent Colorado artist/designer John Dare Howland, who was a clerk for the commission and later designed the Civil War monument at the Colorado Capitol building.

Tappan also vociferously protested the Washita Massacre in November 1868 of Chief Black Kettle's Southern Cheyennes while camped near Ft. Sill Oklahoma Territory by Lt. Col. George A. Custer's Seventh Cavalry troopers. Tappan was also a leading member of Peter Cooper's United States Indian Commission, founded in 1869. He promoted legislation in favor of the funding of annuities and economic assistance promised to the Indians by the federal Indian Peace Commission two years before. Tappan remained active in the cause of native rights throughout the 1870s, strongly supporting President Ulysses S. Grant's peace policy. He openly charged that the efforts of the peace policy to reach a final settlement with Plains and Southwest Indians were being undermined by congressional railroad and land speculation interests, and that these interests were ultimately responsible for such atrocities against the Indians as the 1871 massacre of Eskiminzin's Apache band at Camp Grant, Arizona.

== Marriage and later life ==
Following the Medicine Lodge Treaty in October 1867 which he attended as a Commissioner, Tappan adopted an orphaned Cheyenne girl whom he renamed Minnie Tappan. He made arrangements for Minnie to move back East to Boston, where she was enrolled in public school to further her education. After Tappan married the leading spiritualist Cora L.V. (Scott) Hatch Daniels (later known as Cora L.V. Richmond 1840–1923) and moved to Washington, DC, Minnie joined their household and continued her studies in Washington. When Tappan and his wife moved a few years later to Titusville, Pennsylvania, as part of a business venture, he made arrangements with his friend General Oliver Otis Howard for Minnie to continue her education at the Preparatory Department of what is now Howard University. While studying there in 1873, she fell ill and died. She was buried in a Boston, Massachusetts, cemetery. Tappan also lived for a time during the post-War period in New York City.

Following his service with the Indian Peace Commission, Tappan worked for his former associate Henry Villard at the Oregon Steamship and Railway Company during the 1870s to help systematize and encourage emigration to Oregon. He traveled during this time to Alaska and also represented Oregon at the Centennial Exposition in 1876 in Philadelphia. He later lived in California for a time. Tappan was appointed during the presidency of Chester A. Arthur to become the first superintendent of the United States Indian Industrial School in Genoa, Nebraska, in 1884–1885. The school was started to teach trades and educate Native Americans. Tappan served until removed by President Grover Cleveland.

Tappan's marriage to Cora, who was a spiritualist medium, author, poet, abolitionist, and fellow Native American rights activist, eventually ended in divorce and they had no children together. He lived in Washington, D.C. for the last years of his life and was buried after his death at Arlington National Cemetery.
