= The Test (Wright novel) =

1904 novel by Mary Tappan Wright

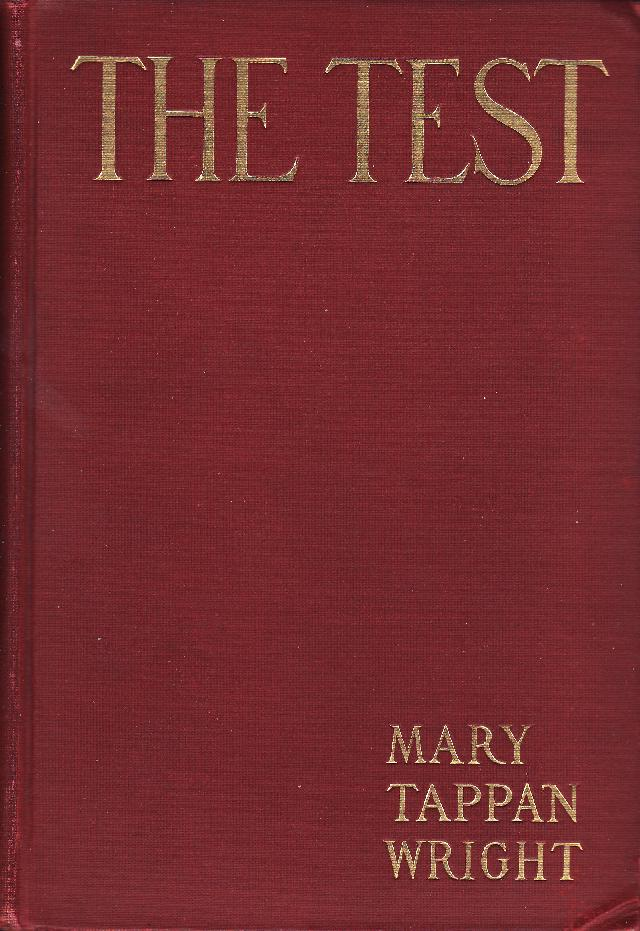
- cover of first edition
- Author: Mary Tappan Wright
- Language: English
- Publisher: Charles Scribner's Sons
- Publication date: 1904
- Publication place: United States
- Media type: Print (hardcover)
- Pages: 360
- Preceded by: Aliens
- Followed by: The Tower

The Test is a novel by Mary Tappan Wright. It was first published in hardcover by Charles Scribner's Sons in February, 1904. It was Wright's second published novel and third published book.

== Plot ==
The story takes place in the college town of Genoa in the Middle West. The heroine, Alice Lindell, secretary to Senator Winchester, is engaged to the senator's son Tom. She attempts to wean Tom away from his weakness for liquor by prematurely giving in to his desire for her, with disastrous results; Tom backslides, and while drunk falls victim to the wiles of another admirer, the unscrupulous Harriet, who marries him. Repenting his folly, he resolves to leave Harriet and run away with Alice, but is persuaded by the latter to fulfill his marriage vows and henceforth conduct himself honorably.

Alice courageously faces the shame of bearing and rearing their illegitimate daughter Anna alone. This ordeal is the test of the title—of herself, her family, and her community. Her story is paralleled in a subplot involving Sallie, a sinner of a lower sort. Over the years Alice is supported by some, notably the senator, but vilified by most of the small-minded townsfolk, including her own mother. Her sister Gertrude, engaged to the priggish clergyman John Prescott, also suffers, her intended suddenly developing cold feet at the news of Alice's indiscretion. Perhaps the height of Alice's suffering is reached when Harriet, having lost her own child, importunes her to let her have Anna instead; persuaded it would be in the best interest of her daughter, Alice finally complies.

In time her enduring patience effects her moral recovery in the eyes of the town, and her example succeeds in inspiring Tom to complete his own personal regeneration. In the conclusion Harriet's death frees them to marry each other, and the two depart Genoa to begin a new life together.

== Reception ==
Reaction to the novel was mixed among reviewers. The New York Times "found some difficulty in getting at the [author's] purpose, ethical or artistic," concluding that it was "as a study of the human conscience, its powers and its limitations," that the novel was to be regarded. Finding the story unpleasant and its characters "generally unlikable," it yet declared it "a book distinctly well written, if to write well, in making fiction, is to so write as to hold the attention of even an unwilling reader and compel him to note with something like admiration the skillful development of the traits of personages for whom he feels no liking whatever." In spite of this dislike, the reviewer noted that Wright "knows her trade as novelist. As novelists go she is one among ten thousand. … [She] has a keen sense of humor, good descriptive powers, a good working knowledge of human nature, an effective style. She can tell a story well."

A harsher opinion was expressed in The Critic, which declared the book "one of the most unconvincing novels that the present reviewer has ever read … psychologically false from beginning to end in respect of the main situations." It allowed "one good chapter, in which Alice imagines her marriage day and restrains her impulse to drown herself, knowing that she is to become a mother; but as a whole, the book is exasperating in the extreme, because it does not ring true."

Other critiques were much more positive. The Springfield Republican felt it "takes a bold subject and treats it in a daring way, yet with such honest of purpose as to take away all offense," finding "much of the skillful exposition of character that appeared in 'Aliens,' while [suggesting] in dramatic intensity . . . some of Mrs. Wright's striking short stories." The Worcester Spy, called it "one of the most interesting books of the year. . . . intensely strong and dramatic throughout." Congregationalist and Christian World found it an "unquestionably powerful story . . . [with] the inevitable unhappiness dogging the footsteps of sin . . . clearly drawn and the moral interest [holding] the reader's attention strongly throughout."

The Lamp, after briefly praising the "place for herself among the novelists whose work demands serious consideration" the author had made with Aliens, declared that "'The Test' strengthens her position, fulfills much promise, [and] justifies more expectation. The author has made of the sin of a man and a woman a test for all the folk who figure in her book—a test of individual, of family, of community. The story is simple enough and it is told simply, clearly, forcibly, with a certain fine reserve and freedom from hysteria [painting] the life of a little town, the souls and deeds of its people with keen insight, wide human sympathy, relentless logic." It also noted "a leaven of humor to lighten her soul study. Her folk do not live altogether in italics … and a vein of cheerful sanity runs through even her grayest chapters, insuring them against the morbidness that is the most dangerous pitfall in the path of the novelist who deals familiarly with souls."
