= Tom Perko =

American football player (1954–1980)

No. 56
- Position: Linebacker

Personal information
- Born: June 17, 1954; Steubenville, Ohio, U.S.
- Died: February 2, 1980 (aged 25); Ambridge, Pennsylvania, U.S.
- Listed height: 6 ft 3 in (1.91 m)
- Listed weight: 233 lb (106 kg)

Career information
- High school: Steubenville
- College: Pittsburgh
- NFL draft: 1976: 4th round, 101st overall pick

Career history
- Green Bay Packers (1976); Hamilton Tiger-Cats (1977–1978)

Career NFL statistics
- Games played: 14
- Stats at Pro Football Reference

Tom Perko (June 17, 1954 – February 2, 1980) was an American professional football player who was a linebacker in the National Football League (NFL) and Canadian Football League (CFL). He graduated from Steubenville Catholic Central High School in 1972, was a member of the school's 1971 state championship team. Perko played college football for the Pittsburgh Panthers. He was selected by the Green Bay Packers in the fourth round of the 1976 NFL draft, and played that season with the team.

Perko was killed in a car accident on February 2, 1980. He was 25.
