= Julius von Pflugk-Harttung =

German historian (1848–1919)

Julius von Pflugk-Harttung (8 November 1848 – 5 November 1919) was a German historian, best known as an authority on Papal and medieval history.

== Biography ==
He was born at Wernikow and served as a soldier during the Franco-Prussian War. He studied history and philology at the universities of Bonn, Berlin, and Göttingen. In 1877 he obtained his habilitation at the University of Tübingen, where shortly afterward he became an associate professor. In 1886, he was named a professor of history at Basel. Then he went to Berlin, where in 1893 he became head of the Secret State Archives.

== Works ==
- Studien zur Geschichte Konrads II (1876–77) – Studies on the history of Conrad II.
- Norwegen und die deutschen Seestädte (1887) – Norway and the German coastal towns.
- Acta Pontificorum Romanorum Inedita, 748–1198 (1879–88)
- Iter Italicum (1883).
- Allgemeine Weltgeschichte (Berlin: G. Grote, 1884–1892), section on the early Middle Ages (1889).
- Krieg und Sieg 1870–71 (1895), the first of his studies of modern history.
- Napoleon I. Revolution und Kaiserreich (1900) – Napoleon I. Revolution and empire.
- Die Bullen der Päpste bis zum Ende des 12. Jahrhunderts (1901) – Papal bulls up until the end of the twelfth century.
- Weltgeschichte (6 volumes, 1907–10).
- Das Befreiungsjahr 1813 (1913) – The liberation year 1813.
- Belle-Alliance-verbündetes Heer (1915) – Belle-Alliance allies; Report and information on the involvement of German troops of the army of Wellington at the Battle of Quatre Bras and the Battle of Belle-Alliance.

A number of his works have been translated into English, among them "The Great Migration" and "The Early Middle Ages", by Wright (Philadelphia, 1902); and "The Franco-German War", by General Maurice (London, 1900).
