= Chinedu Achebe =

American football player (born 1977)

Profile
- Positions: Linebacker, fullback

Personal information
- Born: September 7, 1977 (age 49)
- Listed height: 6 ft 1 in (1.85 m)
- Listed weight: 255 lb (116 kg)

Career information
- High school: Catholic Central (Steubenville, Ohio)
- College: Iowa State
- NFL draft: 1999: undrafted

Career history
- Iowa Barnstormers (2000); New York Dragons (2001—2005); Utah Blaze (2006)*
- * Offseason or practice squad member only

Career AFL statistics
- Tackles: 85
- Sacks: 5.5
- Interceptions: 7–1
- Rushing yards: 95
- Total TDs: 7
- Stats at ArenaFan.com

Chinedu "Chin" Achebe (born September 7, 1977) is an American former football fullback and linebacker who played college football at Iowa State. He attended Steubenville Catholic Central High School. As a senior, he won the Ohio state wrestling championship at 215 pounds. Achebe also played baseball, where he earned 2 varsity letters

He played in Arena Football League with the Iowa Barnstormers (2000), and the New York Dragons (2001–2005). Achebe was the 19th selection of the Utah Blaze expansion draft.
