= Rich Donnelly =

American professional baseball coach (born 1946)

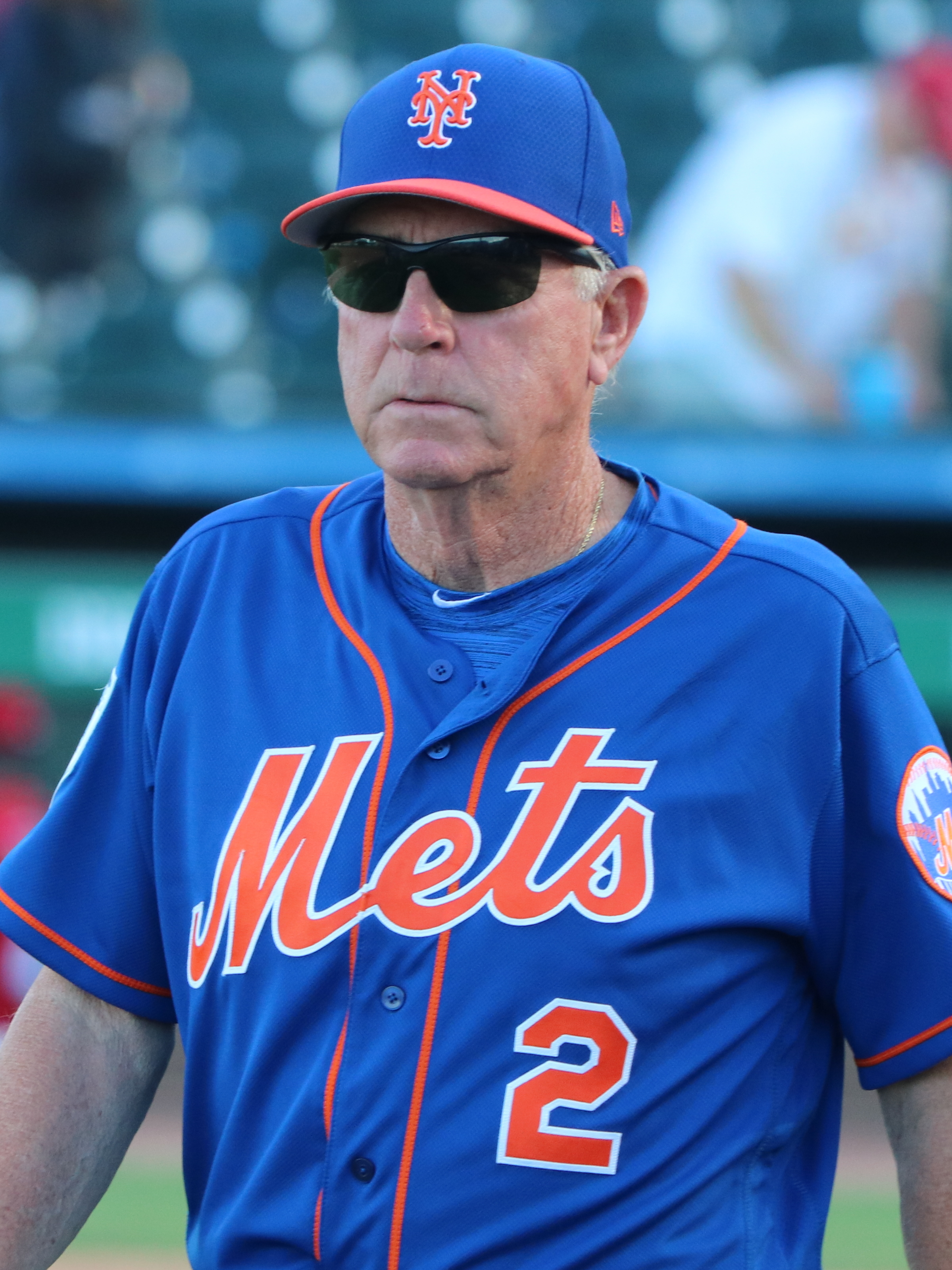
- Donnelly with the Mets in 2019
- Coach
- Born: August 3, 1946 (age 79); Steubenville, Ohio, U.S.
- Bats: Left Throws: Right
- Stats at Baseball Reference

Teams
- As coach: Texas Rangers (1980, 1983–1985); Pittsburgh Pirates (1986–1996); Florida Marlins (1997–1998); Colorado Rockies (1999–2002); Milwaukee Brewers (2003–2005); Los Angeles Dodgers (2006–2007); Seattle Mariners (2014–2015)

Career highlights and awards
- World Series champion (1997)
Medals
Men's baseball
Representing the United States
World Baseball Classic
Gold medal – first place	2017 Los Angeles	Team

Richard Francis Donnelly (born August 3, 1946) is an American professional baseball coach. On March 7, 2014, he was named third-base coach of the Seattle Mariners, replacing John Stearns. He served in the post for two seasons, through 2015, before his release on October 9, 2015. Donnelly was a Major League Baseball (MLB) coach for over 25 years, and was a catcher during his active career in minor league baseball.

Donnelly had been slated to spend 2014 as manager of the Tacoma Rainiers of the Pacific Coast League, the Mariners' Triple-A affiliate. However, Stearns underwent hiatal hernia surgery prior to spring training on February 24, and his slower-than-expected recovery caused him to step down to a professional scouting post with the Mariners. Donnelly was then named to take his place on the staff of manager Lloyd McClendon, whose playing tenure with the Pittsburgh Pirates (1990–1994) coincided with Donnelly's service on Jim Leyland's coaching staff.

Prior to joining the Mariners' organization in 2014, Donnelly spent three seasons (2011–2013) as manager of the Brooklyn Cyclones of the New York–Penn League, Short Season-A farm club of the New York Mets.

== Early life ==
Donnelly graduated from Steubenville Catholic Central High School in Ohio where he played baseball and basketball. He attended college at Xavier University.

== Playing career ==
Donnelly was signed as a catcher by the Minnesota Twins in 1967 and played four seasons in the Twins' and Washington Senators' minor league systems, compiling a .224 career batting average with two home runs and 73 runs batted in in 313 games played.

== Coaching career ==
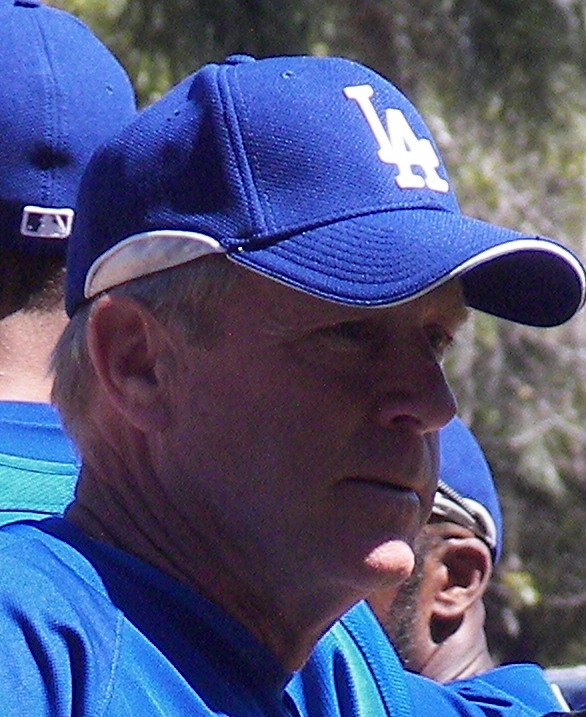
Donnelly with the Dodgers in 2007

Donnelly managed in the Texas Rangers farm system from 1972 to 1979 and 1981 to 1982. He was honored as the Western Carolinas League Manager of the Year from 1972 to 1974. He led the Class A Gastonia Rangers to the league title in 1974. He managed the Rangers Class AAA affiliate from 1976 to 1979 and 1981 to 1982.

Donnelly was the bullpen coach for the Texas Rangers in 1980. He served as the first base coach for the Rangers from 1983 to 1985. Donnelly spent 14 seasons on Jim Leyland's staff with three organizations—Pittsburgh (1986–1996), Florida (1997–1998) and Colorado (1999). He earned a World Series ring with Florida in 1997. He remained with the Rockies through 2002.

He was a third base coach for the Milwaukee Brewers from 2003 to 2005 and for the Los Angeles Dodgers in 2006 and 2007, then worked in player development for the Pittsburgh Pirates from 2008 to 2010. From 2011 to 2013, Donnelly was the manager of the short-season Class A Brooklyn Cyclones. He was named manager of the Class AAA Tacoma Rainiers on January 16, 2014. He became the Seattle Mariners third base coach on March 7, 2014. Donnelly rejoined the Brooklyn Cyclones for their 2018 season as the Bench Coach to manager Edgardo Alfonzo. The Mets promoted Donnelly to Manager of the Kingsport Mets for 2019.

== Personal life ==
Donnelly is on the board of directors for the International Racquetball Tour and is an avid racquetball player. When asked which sport he favors between baseball and racquetball, he answered racquetball without hesitating.

Perhaps the best known story of Donnelly is his experience coaching the Florida Marlins in the 1997 World Series. His 17-year-old daughter, Amy, died of a brain tumor in 1993. Amy attended a 1992 playoff game in which Rich was coaching. She noticed that he would cup his hands over his mouth while yelling out instructions to runners on second base. After the game, she asked, "Dad, what are you telling them? That the chicken runs at midnight, or what?" After her death, "The Chicken Runs at Midnight" was engraved on her tombstone and it became the family motto.

In 1997, as a member of the Florida Marlins, he met Craig Counsell, a player his son Tim nicknamed "Chicken" because of his unique batting stance. In the 11th inning of Game 7, Counsell reached base and was able to advance to third base as the inning progressed. Edgar Rentería then hit a single on which Counsell scored, winning the World Series for the Marlins. Rich's sons Tim and Mike, who were honorary bat boys that evening, rushed to their father in celebration. Tim pointed out to the stadium clock which read 12:00 midnight, telling his father, "The Chicken ran at midnight, Dad." Donnelly believes that Amy was sending him a message from Heaven, and this experience has strengthened his faith in God.

Donnelly's son, Michael, was killed at age 38 in a car accident on January 7, 2018. Michael and a few others had stopped to help a motorist push their disabled car off the highway when a car struck Michael and a woman. The mother-of-two was saved by Michael, who grabbed her shirt and pulled her into his body, shielding her from the brunt of the impact. Lyndsee Longoria, the woman that Michael saved, keeps in contact with Donnelly, who comforted her in the difficult months after the accident. In November 2018, she gave birth to her third child, whom she named Michael Donnelly Longoria.

Rich Donnelly has six living children.

The Chicken Runs at Midnight by Tom Friend is a book about Donnelly's story, released on October 2, 2018. The book was featured on the documentary Champions of Faith, highlighting the stories of Catholic MLB players.

Sporting positions
Preceded by Tommy Helms	Texas Rangers first base coach 1983–1985	Succeeded by Art Howe
Preceded by Rick Peterson	Pittsburgh Pirates bullpen coach 1986–1992	Succeeded by Terry Collins
Preceded by Gene Lamont	Pittsburgh Pirates third base coach 1993–1995	Succeeded by Gene Lamont
Preceded by Bill Virdon	Pittsburgh Pirates bench coach 1996	Succeeded by Rick Renick
Preceded by Cookie Rojas	Florida Marlins third base coach 1997–1998	Succeeded by Fredi González
Preceded by Gene Glynn	Colorado Rockies third base coach 1999–2002	Succeeded by Sandy Alomar Sr.
Preceded by Gary Allenson	Milwaukee Brewers third base coach 2003–2005	Succeeded by Dale Sveum
Preceded by Glenn Hoffman	Los Angeles Dodgers third base coach 2006–2007	Succeeded by Larry Bowa
Preceded by John Stearns	Seattle Mariners third base coach 2014–2015	Succeeded by Manny Acta
