= Making of America =

Making of America (MoA) is a collaborative effort by Cornell University and the University of Michigan to digitize and make available a collection of primary sources relating to the development of U.S. infrastructure. The Making of America collection at Cornell contains close to a million pages from more than 250 monographs and almost 1000 serials. The University of Michigan Library holds almost 13,000 volumes containing nearly four million pages of e-text.

== History ==
The initial phase of the Making of America project began in 1995 with the development of an organized collaboration between the University of Michigan and Cornell University. The original funding for the project was in the form of grants from the Andrew W. Mellon Foundation. For the beginning phase of the project, the Antebellum Period through the Reconstruction Era, 1850-1877 was selected; the project initiators felt that the literature of this period was appropriate for the beginning phase because it was manageable in scope, of high interest to potential users and the original documents were in need to reformatting due to rapid deterioration. The two participating institutions each focused on different aspects of this period of literature based on what each already had in its collections. The University of Michigan libraries worked primarily on monographs while Cornell University focused on the journal literature of this period. Plans are underway to continue the expansion of the Making of America Project with the involvement of other major research libraries and the Digital Library Federation.

== Digital conversion and implementation ==
The original print documents included in the Making of America project were scanned to create the digital copies that are included in the collection. The digital conversion process was completed by Northern Micrographic, Inc. in La Crosse, Wisconsin. The digital Making of America collection is mounted online using the Digital Library Extension System (DLXS) which was developed by the University of Michigan.

== Using the collection ==
The Making of America collection can be searched through both the University of Michigan Library and Cornell University Library websites. The interface provides browsing and searches of various types including basic, Boolean, bibliographic, and proximity. The Cornell University Library site specifically states that permissions are not required to use items from the Making of America project collection, but recommends a credit line to be included. The University of Michigan offers reprints of included materials and Cornell University can provide enhanced files if desired.
