= John Kirtland Wright =

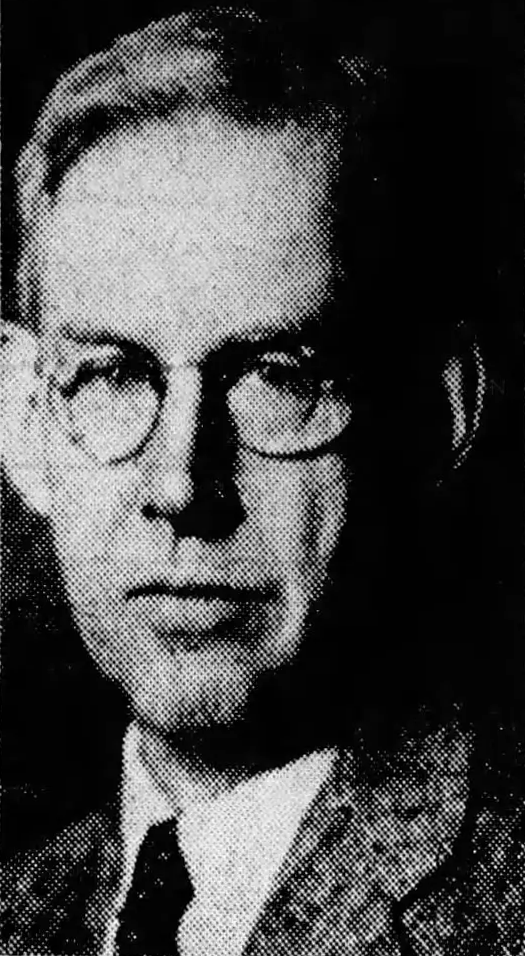
John Kirtland Wright

John Kirtland Wright (30 November 1891, Cambridge, Massachusetts – 24 March 1969, Hanover, New Hampshire) was an American geographer, notable for his cartography, geosophy, and study of the history of geographical thought. He was the son of classical scholar John Henry Wright and novelist Mary Tappan Wright, and the brother of legal scholar and utopian novelist Austin Tappan Wright. He married Katharine McGiffert Jan. 21, 1921 in New York, N.Y. They had three children: Austin McGiffert Wright, Gertrude Huntington McPherson, and Mary Wolcott Toynbee.

Having completed a PhD in history at Harvard University, in 1920 Wright was employed as librarian by the American Geographical Society; between the years of 1920 and 1956 he also served as an AGS editor, personal academic contributor, and eventually director. As a result of his prolific academic and professional life, three main themes have emerged in John K. Wright’s published works. These include: the overlapping of academic disciplines (mainly history) with geography, the power of the mind and the supernatural realm in creating subjectivity in geographic research, and the importance of sharing academic knowledge.

== Geographic subjectivity ==
While at one point the discipline of geography ignored the influence of subjectivity in human and physical patterns, John Kirtland Wright brought to the forefront the significance of the mind and the imagination in affecting scientific research. Specifically, he stressed the duality of both the mind’s reality and of mental, often transcendental, images. Included in this arena of study were his interests in geographical cosmogony and cosmography, which pertained to the theological realm of the divine, “God’s invisible creation,” and the emotional bonds between people and places, which he then compared to the physical realm of land surface, climate, and cartography (Wright 1928).

== History of geography ==
Wright was highly interested in the history of geography and the importance of accurate geographic archival records. He discovered and documented the influences of various religious perspectives on geography, with a very keen interest in Gothic and medieval representations that signified both divine and earthly geographic beauty (Wright 1965). In addition, he wrote prolifically on the Greek and Roman geographic influences, largely pertaining to the fifteenth- century map of the world by Giovanni Leardo (Wright, AGS, 1928). This was the second oldest map that was given to the AGS in 1906, dated in the 15th century. Wright’s historic and cartographic fascination was sparked by the unusual, detailed features of the map, including a calendar encompassing the center image, and by the concept it depicted of the earth’s surface before the actual discovery of America; Leardo’s known world includes Asia, Africa, the Mediterranean, and Europe. Greek and Roman sources were used for the making of the map, specifically including Greek notions that the earth existed as a flat disk. The document lacks the evocative drawings seen in many other medieval maps that were primarily used to fill blank map space (drawings mostly of animals.) Lastly, Leardo features Jerusalem as the city center (Wright, AGS, 1928). Ultimately, Wright indicates that the blurring of the fields of history and geography has much significance, as each subject relies on the other for accuracy (Wright, Henry Holt, 1928.) After retiring as director from the American Geographical Society, Wright continued his quest for historic elucidation by writing on the history of the Society and its connection to the development of geography (Light 1950).

Wright coined the term choropleth map in 1938, although the mapping technique itself was first used by Charles Dupin in 1826. Wright cautioned against the use of choropleth maps, instead espousing the virtues of the dasymetric map. Nine years later, in 1947, Wright introduced the notion of geosophy, `the study of geographical knowledge from any or all points of view. To geography what historiography is to history, it deals with the nature and expression of geographical knowledge both past and present' (Wright 1947).

== See also ==
- Geopiety

== Partial bibliography ==
- "Buildings and Parts of Cambridge Commemorated in Longfellow's Poems," in The Cambridge Historical Society. Publications III. Cambridge, Massachusetts, the Society, 1908. (Google e-text)
- Geographical Knowledge in Western Europe from 1100 to 1250 (thesis). 1914.
- Aids to Geographical Research: Bibliographies and Periodicals. New York, American Geographical Society, 1923.
- Notes on the Knowledge of Latitudes and Longitudes in the Middle Ages. Isis 5 (1) 76-98, 1923.
- The Geographical Lore of the Time of the Crusades; a Study in the History of Medieval Science and Tradition in Western Europe. New York, American Geographical Society, 1925.
- The Geographical Basis of European History. New York, H. Holt and Company, 1928.
- The Leardo Map of the World, 1452 or 1453, in the Collections of the American Geographical Society. New York, American Geographical Society, 1928.
- Sections and National Growth: an Atlas of the Historical Geography of the United States. New York, American Geographical Society, 1932.* "The exploration of the fiord region of east Greenland: a historical outline." New York, N.Y., American Geographical Society, 1935.
- Notes on Statistical Mapping, with Special Reference to the Mapping of Population Phenomena (with Loyd A. Jones, Leonard Stone and T. W. Birch). New York, American Geographical Society, 1938.
- The European Possessions in the Caribbean area; a Compilation of Facts Concerning Their Population, Physical Geography, Resources, Industries, Trade, Government, and Strategic Importance (with Raye R. Platt, John C. Weaver and Johnson E. Fairchild). New York, American Geographical Society, 1941.
- Aids to Geographical Research: Bibliographies, Periodicals, Atlases, Gazetteers and Other Reference Books (with Elizabeth T. Platt). 2d ed. New York, Columbia Univ. Press, 1947.
- Geography in the Making; the American Geographical Society, 1851-1951. New York, the Society, 1952.
- Human Nature in Geography: Fourteen Papers, 1925-1965. Cambridge, Harvard University Press, 1966.

== Awards ==
- 1955 Founder's Medal of the Royal Geographical Society
