= Benjamin Tappan =

American judge (1773–1857)

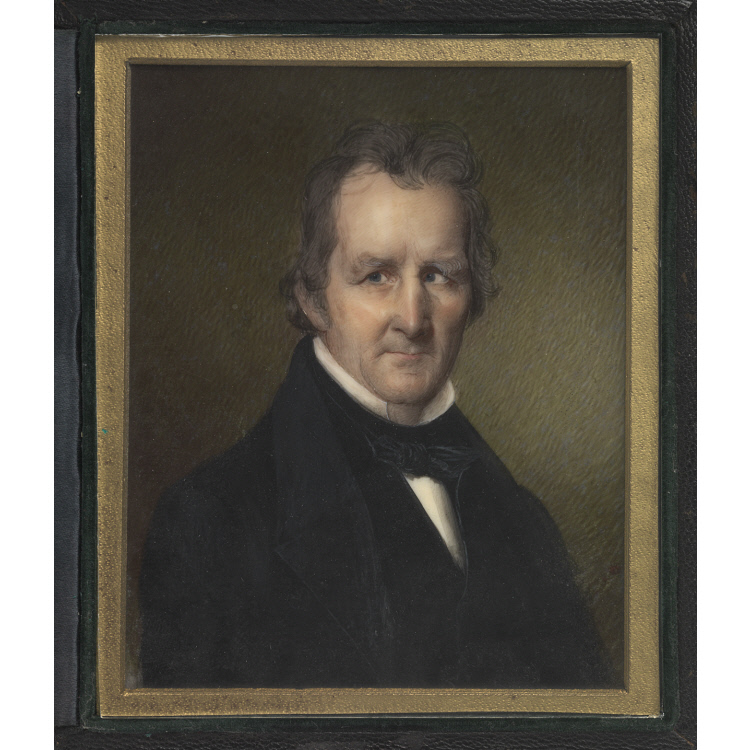
- Portrait, 1839

United States Senator from Ohio
- In office March 4, 1839 – March 3, 1845
- Preceded by: Thomas Morris
- Succeeded by: Thomas Corwin

Judge of the United States District Court for the District of Ohio
- In office October 12, 1833 – June 30, 1834
- Appointed by: Andrew Jackson
- Preceded by: John Wilson Campbell
- Succeeded by: Humphrey H. Leavitt

Personal details
- Born: May 25, 1773 Northampton, Massachusetts Bay, British America
- Died: April 20, 1857 (aged 83) Steubenville, Ohio, U.S.
- Resting place: Union Cemetery
- Party: Democratic
- Children: Eli
- Relatives: Benjamin Franklin (cousin); Arthur Tappan (brother); Lewis Tappan (brother); John Wright (brother-in-law); Mary Tappan Wright (granddaughter); Austin Tappan Wright (great-grandson); John Kirtland Wright (great-grandson); Austin Wright (great-great-grandson)

Benjamin Tappan (May 25, 1773 – April 20, 1857) was a United States district judge of the United States District Court for the District of Ohio and a United States senator from Ohio.

== Education and career ==
Born on May 25, 1773, in Northampton, Province of Massachusetts Bay, British America, Tappan attended the public schools and was apprenticed as a printer and engraver. He traveled to the West Indies and studied painting with Gilbert Stuart. He read law in 1799. He was admitted to the bar in Hartford, Connecticut and entered private practice in Ravenna, Northwest Territory (State of Ohio from March 1, 1803) from 1799 to 1803, located in what was the Connecticut Western Reserve until 1800. He was a member of the Ohio Senate from 1803 to 1804. He resumed private practice in Ravenna from 1804 to 1809. He continued private practice in Steubenville, Ohio from 1809 to 1812, and from 1814 to 1816. He was a United States Army major from 1812 to 1814, during the War of 1812. He was a Judge of the Ohio Court of Common Pleas for the Fifth Judicial District from 1816 to 1823. He resumed private practice in Steubenville from 1823 to 1838. He was a presidential elector on the Democratic ticket in 1832. In October 1838, he formed a law partnership with Edwin Stanton.

== Federal judicial service ==
Tappan received a recess appointment from President Andrew Jackson on October 12, 1833 to a seat on the United States District Court for the District of Ohio vacated by Judge John Wilson Campbell. He was nominated to the same position by President Jackson on January 20, 1834. His service terminated with the sine die adjournment of the first session of the 23rd United States Congress on June 30, 1834, after his nomination was rejected by the United States Senate on May 29, 1834.

== Congressional service ==
Tappan was elected as a Democrat from Ohio to the United States Senate and served from March 4, 1839, to March 3, 1845. He was Chairman of the Committee to Audit and Control the Contingent Expenses for the 27th and 28th United States Congresses and Chairman of the Committee on the Library for the 27th United States Congress. He was censured by the Senate in 1844 for breach of confidence for passing copies of a proposed treaty with Texas to the press.

== Later career and death ==
Following his departure from Congress, Tappan resumed private practice in Steubenville from 1845 to 1857. He died on April 12, 1857, in Steubenville, Jefferson County, Ohio. He was interred in Union Cemetery in Steubenville.

== Settler and city founder ==
Tappan was an early settler of the Connecticut Western Reserve in northeastern Ohio and was one of the first settlers in Portage County and the founder of the city of Ravenna.

== Family ==
Tappan was the second child and oldest son of Benjamin Tappan and Sarah (Homes) Tappan, who was a grandniece of Benjamin Franklin. Two of his younger brothers were abolitionists Arthur Tappan and Lewis Tappan. He married, March 20, 1801, Nancy Wright, sister of John C. Wright, afterwards a United States representative from Ohio. They had one son, Benjamin, born in 1812. His first wife having died, Benjamin was married a second time, in 1823, to Betsy (Lord) Frazer, the widow of Eliphalet Frazer. They had one son, Eli Todd Tappan, later president of Kenyon College.

== See also ==
- List of United States senators expelled or censured

== Sources ==
- United States Congress. "Benjamin Tappan (id: T000039)". Biographical Directory of the United States Congress.
- Daniel Langdon Tappan. Tappan-Toppan Genealogy, Arlington, Massachusetts, 1915, pp. 24–25.
- Brown, R. C. and Norris, J. E. History of Portage County Ohio, Chicago, Illinois, 1885, 1972 rev., pp. 521–522.

Legal offices
Preceded by John Wilson Campbell	Judge of the United States District Court for the District of Ohio; 1833–1834	Succeeded by Humphrey H. Leavitt
U.S. Senate
Preceded by Thomas Morris	U.S. Senator (Class 1) from Ohio; 1839–1845; Served alongside: William Allen	Succeeded by Thomas Corwin
Preceded by Albert Smith White	Chair of the Senate Audit Committee; 1842–1845	Succeeded by Jesse Speight
Honorary titles
Preceded by Jonathan Roberts	Oldest Living United States Senator; 1854–1857	Succeeded by Littleton Waller Tazewell
