= Jon Nese =

American meteorologist

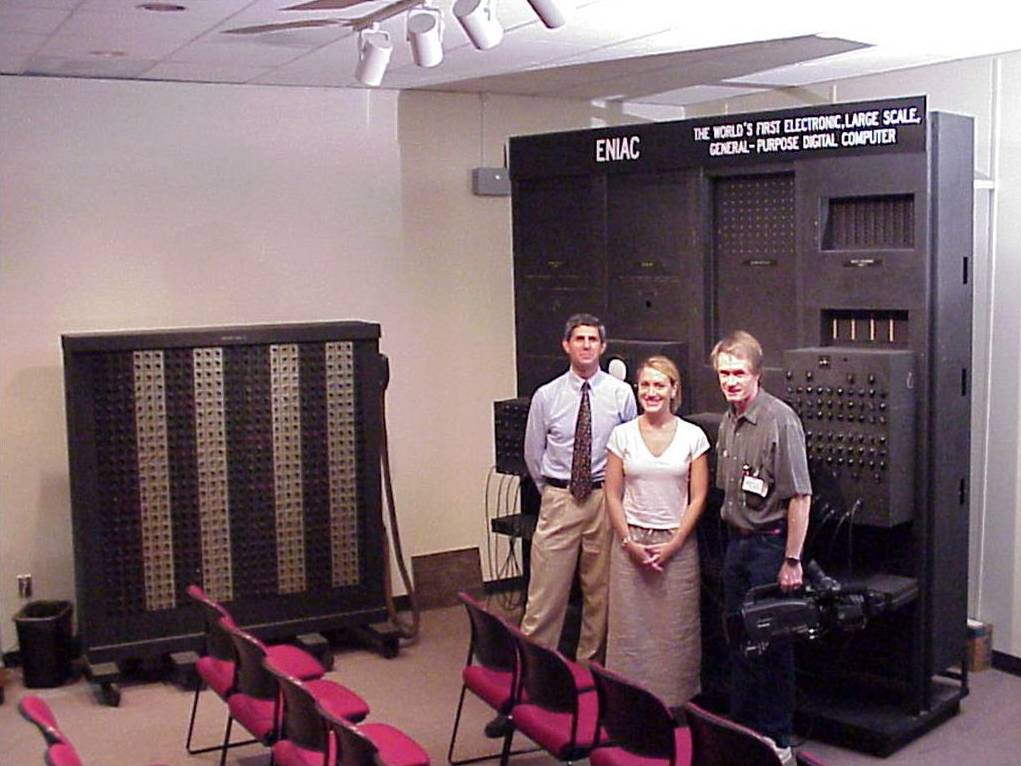
Franklin Institute's Chief Meteorologist, Dr. Jon Nese (left) and his production crew from WHYY-TV (right) pose in front of a portion of the original ENIAC computer, in the ENIAC museum on the campus of the University of Pennsylvania in Philadelphia.

Jon Nese is a Teaching Professor and Associate Head of Undergraduate Programs in the Department of Meteorology and Atmospheric Science at The Pennsylvania State University. Nese was born in Pittsburgh, Pennsylvania and raised in Steubenville, Ohio, and attended Penn State as a student in the 1980s earning his B.S., M.S. and PhD., all in meteorology. Nese worked as a faculty member at the Penn State Beaver and Hazleton campuses from 1989–1998, and returned to the University Park campus in 2005.

From 1998 to 2002, he was Chief Meteorologist at the historic Franklin Institute Science Museum in Philadelphia. Between 2002 and 2005 Nese served as the Storm Analyst on The Weather Channel, primarily appearing on the morning show "Your Weather Today." While working at The Weather Channel, he wrote and co-produced informational weather segments known as Dr. Nese's Notebook. Nese is the co-author of three books: The Philadelphia Area Weather Book (with Glenn Schwartz), which was awarded the American Meteorological Society's Louis J. Battan Author's Award; A World of Weather: Fundamentals of Meteorology (with Lee Grenci); and The Weather Gods Curse the Gettysburg Campaign (with Jeffrey Harding).

Currently, he appears on Penn State's weekday weather magazine show Weather World, where he occasionally hosts and provides weekly informational features called "WxYz" (WeatherWhys). Weather World is the only statewide TV weather show in the country produced by a university's meteorology department. The show, produced by Penn State's Department of Meteorology and Atmospheric Science, can be seen each weekday evening at 5:30 and 5:45 p.m. in central Pennsylvania on WPSU-TV and statewide at 5:45 p.m. on the Pennsylvania Cable Network. In 2015 Weather Whys won an Emmy Award for the best weather series in the Mid-Atlantic region. From 2006 to 2009, Nese also appeared on Huddle Up, a Penn State football show on the local public television station WPSU-TV.
