= Ferdinand Justi =

German linguist and orientalist (1837-1907)

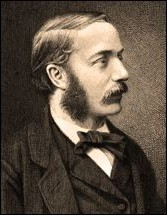
Ferdinand Justi

Ferdinand Justi (2 June 1837 in Marburg, Germany – 17 February 1907 in Marburg) was a German linguist and Orientalist.

He finished his studies of linguistics at the University of Marburg and the University of Göttingen. In 1861 he lived in Marburg, where in 1865 he became associate and in 1869 full professor of comparative linguistics and Germanic philology.

In addition to his academic work, he studied with meticulous precision the life of the Hessian peasants in the last third of the 19th century, especially in the immediate and wider area of Marburg, on which he wrote his observations and described it in countless sketches and watercolors. One of his main themes included buildings, furniture, agricultural implements, and especially costumes, with all its subtleties and accessories.

== Works ==
- Handbuch der Zendsprache. Leipzig 1864
- Dictionnaire kurde-francaise. Petersburg 1879
- Geschichte des alten Persiens. Berlin 1879
- Kurdische Grammatik. Sankt Petersburg 1880
- Geschichte der orientalischen Völker im Altertum. Berlin 1884
- Iranisches Namenbuch. Marburg 1884
- Hessisches Trachtenbuch. Marburg 1899 - 1905

== Literature ==
- Eberhard W. L. Justi (1974). "Justi, Ferdinand". Neue Deutsche Biographie (in German). Vol. 10. Berlin: Duncker & Humblot. pp. 703–704.
