= Mary Tappan Wright =

American novelist

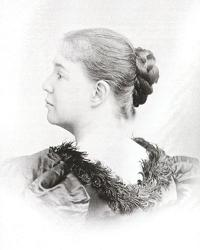
- Wright, c. 1894
- Born: Mary Tappan; December 14, 1851; Steubenville, Ohio
- Died: August 25, 1916 (aged 64); Cambridge, Massachusetts
- Occupations: Novelist, short story writer
- Writing career
- Period: 1887–1912
- Notable work: Aliens (1902)

Mary Tappan Wright (December 14, 1851 – August 25, 1916) was an American novelist and short story writer best known for her acute characterizations and depictions of academic life. She was the wife of classical scholar John Henry Wright and the mother of legal scholar and utopian novelist Austin Tappan Wright and geographer John Kirtland Wright.

== Life and family ==
Wright was born Mary Tappan December 14, 1851, in Steubenville, Ohio, or December 18 of the same year, the daughter of Eli Todd Tappan, president of Kenyon College, and Lydia (McDowell) Tappan. She was educated at Auburn Young Ladies' Institute, Cincinnati, Ohio. She married, April 2, 1878, John Henry Wright, then an associate professor of Greek at Dartmouth College and later professor of classical philology and dean of the Collegiate Board of Johns Hopkins University, professor of Greek at Harvard University, and dean of Harvard's Graduate School of Arts and Sciences. The couple had three children, Elizabeth Tappan Wright (who died young), Austin Tappan Wright, and John Kirtland Wright. They lived successively in Hanover, New Hampshire, Baltimore, Maryland, and Cambridge, Massachusetts, aside from one period during which John was a professor at the American School of Classical Studies at Athens, when they resided in Greece. Wright was a founding member of the Boston Authors Club in 1900. Her husband died November 25, 1908, and she herself died August 25, 1916, in Cambridge. She was survived by her two sons.

== Career ==
=== Works ===
Wright and her husband are said to have "worked together on their literary activities." Wright's first known published story was "How They Cured Him", which appeared in The Youth's Companion (March 24, 1887), one of several written for that periodical. Some of the Youth's Companion tales form a loose series centering on holidays and featuring recurring characters; some of the early Dulwich tales were also published in that magazine. However, Wright's tales for Scribner's Magazine, beginning with "As Haggards of the Rock" (May 1890), attracted more notice, and the initial six of them, including also "A Truce", "A Portion of the Tempest", "From Macedonia", "Deep as First Love", and "A Fragment of a Play, With a Chorus", were collected in her first book, A Truce, and Other Stories (1895). None of her other short stories were gathered into book form in her lifetime.

Much of her fiction dealt with American university life, often set in the fictional college town she called Dulwich in her short stories and The Test, and Great Dulwich in her other novels, which combines elements of both Kenyon College and Harvard University. Her novels are all set in college towns, the third and fourth in Dulwich itself (the first and second also mention it peripherally). Her first novel, Aliens (1902), attracted much attention when it appeared for its portrait of contemporary northerners in the racially tense Southern town of Tallawara. The next, The Test (1904), the story of a wronged young woman, received mixed reviews for what some perceived as its unpleasant subject matter and unsympathetic characters, though it was generally praised as well written. The Tower (1906) was described as "a love story placed against the life of a college community taken from the faculty side and told with deep understanding and the most delicate art" and The Charioteers (1912) as "a story of the social life and environment of college professors and their families."

Wright's first four books were published by Charles Scribner's Sons, the fifth being issued by D. Appleton & Company after having been rejected by the Houghton Mifflin Company. Close to half of her short pieces appeared in Scribner's Magazine; others appeared in The Youth's Companion, Christian Union and its successor The Outlook, The Independent, Harper's Magazine, Harper's Weekly, and an anthology of works by various authors. She also contributed a book review to the North American Review.

All of Wright's novels are currently available in e-editions on Book Search. Aliens was reprinted by Kessinger Publishing, LLC, in June 2007; The Tower was reprinted by Kessinger in December 2008. Wright's previously uncollected short stories were issued in new collections by Fleabonnet Press from December 2007-November 2008.

=== Critical reception ===
In her writing Wright was praised as having "a keen sense of humor, good descriptive powers, a good working knowledge of human nature, an effective style" and the ability to "tell a story well." Her skill at characterization was also noted.

=== Papers ===
Wright's papers, including correspondence and original manuscripts and fragments, are found in various archival collections at the Harvard University Library and the Houghton Library at Harvard College. An early commonplace book from 1870 to 1877, containing mostly poetry, is in the Stone-Wright family papers at the Massachusetts Historical Society.

== Bibliography ==
=== Novels ===
- Aliens (Scribner's, 1902) (Google e-text)
- The Test (Scribner's, 1904) (Google e-text)
- The Tower (Scribner's, 1906) (Dulwich series) (Google e-text)
- The Charioteers (Appleton, 1912) (Dulwich series) (Google e-text)

=== Collections ===
- A Truce, and Other Stories (Scribner's, 1895) (e-text)
- Pro Tempore, and Other Stories (2007) (e-text)
- Dead Letters, and Other Pieces (2008) (e-text)
- Beginning Alone, and Other Stories (2008) (e-text)
- Uncollected Works (2008) (e-text)

=== Short stories ===
- "How They Cured Him" (The Youth’s Companion v. 60, no. 12, March 24, 1887; reprinted in Parry’s Monthly Magazine v. 3, no. 10, July 1887) (Holiday series) (Google e-text) (another e-text)
- "Alice's Christmas" (The Youth’s Companion v. 62, no. 41, December 19, 1889) (Holiday series) (e-text)
- "Numbered With Thy Saints" (The Youth’s Companion v. 63, no. 14, Apr. 3, 1890) (Dulwich series) (e-text)
- "As Haggards of the Rock" (Scribner’s Magazine v. 7, no. 5, May 1890) (Making of America e-text) (another e-text)
- "Beginning Alone" (The Youth’s Companion v. 63, no. 36, September 4, 1890, v. 63, no. 37, September 11, 1890, v. 63, no. 38, September 18, 1890, v. 63, no. 39, September 25, 1890, v. 63, no. 40, October 2, 1890, v. 63, no. 41, October 9, 1890, v. 63, no. 42, October 16, 1890, and v. 63, no. 43, October 23, 1890) (Dulwich series) (e-text)
- "A Truce" (Scribner’s Magazine v. 9, no. 1, Jan. 1891) (Making of America e-text) (another e-text)
- "A Fragment of a Play, With a Chorus" (Scribner’s Magazine v. 9, no. 5, May 1891) (Making of America e-text) (another e-text)
- "Divided Allegiances" (Christian Union v. 45, no. 6, February 6, 1892, v. 45, no. 7, February 13, 1892, v. 45, no. 8, February 20, 1892, and v. 45, no. 9, February 27, 1892) (e-text)
- "A Lad—Dismissed" (The Outlook v. 48, no. 2, July 8, 1893, v. 48, no. 3, July 15, 1893, v. 48, no. 4, July 22, 1893, v. 48, no. 5, July 29, 1893, v. 48, no. 6, August 5, 1893, and v. 48, no. 7, August 12, 1893) (e-text)
- "The Gray Fur Rug" (The Youth’s Companion no. 3470, Nov. 23, 1893) (Holiday series) (e-text)
- "Deep as First Love" (Scribner’s Magazine v. 15, no. 2, Feb. 1894) (Making of America e-text) (another e-text)
- "A Portion of the Tempest" (Scribner’s Magazine v. 15, no. 6, Jun. 1894) (Jackson series) (Making of America e-text) (another e-text)
- "His Last" (The Youth’s Companion no. 3498, Jun. 7, 1894, and no. 3499, Jun. 14, 1894; reprinted as "His Last Offence, A Story of College Life", 1900) (Dulwich series) (e-text)
- "From Macedonia" (Scribner’s Magazine v. 16, no. 4, Oct. 1894) (Jackson series) (Making of America e-text) (another e-text)
- "Three Fires at Redmont" (The Youth’s Companion no. 3550, June 6, 1895) (e-text)
- "Cunliffe" (Scribner's Magazine v. 20, no. 3, September 1896) (Google e-text) (another e-text)
- "The Key of the Fields" (Scribner's Magazine v. 23, no. 2, February 1898) (Making of America e-text) (another e-text)
- "An Exception" (The Independent v. 51, no. 2616, January 19, 1899; reprinted in Massachusetts Ploughman and New England Journal of Agriculture v. 58, no. 20, February 11, 1899) (Google e-text) (another e-text)
- "Ethel's Christmas Brother" (The Churchman v. 81, no. 3 (whole no. 2870), January 20, 1900) (Google e-text) (another e-text)
- "The Best Laid Plans" (ca.1901)
- "A Day Together" (Scribner's Magazine v. 29, no. 1, January 1901) (Google e-text) (another e-text)
- "Dead Letters" (The Independent v. 53, no. 2753, September 5, 1901) (Dulwich series) (e-text)
- "A Sacred Concert" (Scribner's Magazine v. 34, no. 1, July 1903) (Dulwich series) (Google e-text) (another e-text)
- "Vox" (Harper's Monthly Magazine v. 107, no. 641, October 1903) (Google e-text) (another e-text)
- "Pro Tempore" (Scribner's Magazine v. 39, no. 6, June 1906) (Dulwich series) (Google e-text) (another e-text)
- "The Mountain" (Harper's Weekly v. 51, no. 2615, February 2, 1907) (e-text)
- "Asphodel" (Scribner's Magazine v. 46, no. 4, October 1909) (Google e-text) (another e-text)

=== Non-fiction ===
- "Children and Books" (article) (The Churchman v. 81, no. 9 (whole no. 2876), March 3, 1900) (Google e-text) (another e-text)
- "The Iron Woman" (review of the novel by Margaret Deland) (The North American Review v. 194, no. 673, December 1911) (e-text)

== General references ==
- Coyle, William, ed. Ohio Authors and Their Books. Biographical data and selective bibliographies for Ohio authors, native and resident, 1796–1950. Cleveland: World Publishing Co., 1962.
