= Eli Todd Tappan =

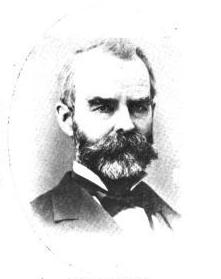
- Born: April 30, 1824; Steubenville, Ohio, United States
- Died: October 23, 1888 (aged 64); Columbus, Ohio, United States
- Occupations: educator, mathematician, author, lawyer, and newspaper editor

Eli Todd Tappan (1824–1888) was an American educator, mathematician, author, lawyer, and newspaper editor who served as president of Kenyon College, among other public distinctions. He was the son of Senator Benjamin Tappan and the father of author Mary Tappan Wright.

== Family, life and education ==
Tappan was born April 30, 1824, in Steubenville, Ohio, the son of Benjamin Tappan and his second wife Betsy (Lord) Tappan. His education was received in local public schools, through private tutors, and at St. Mary's College in Baltimore, Maryland. Afterwards he studied law with his father and Edwin M. Stanton, who was his father's partner, and in 1846 he was admitted to the bar. He married, February 4, 1851, Lydia McDowell of Steubenville. The couple had two children, Mary and Charles. He died October 23, 1888.

== Career ==
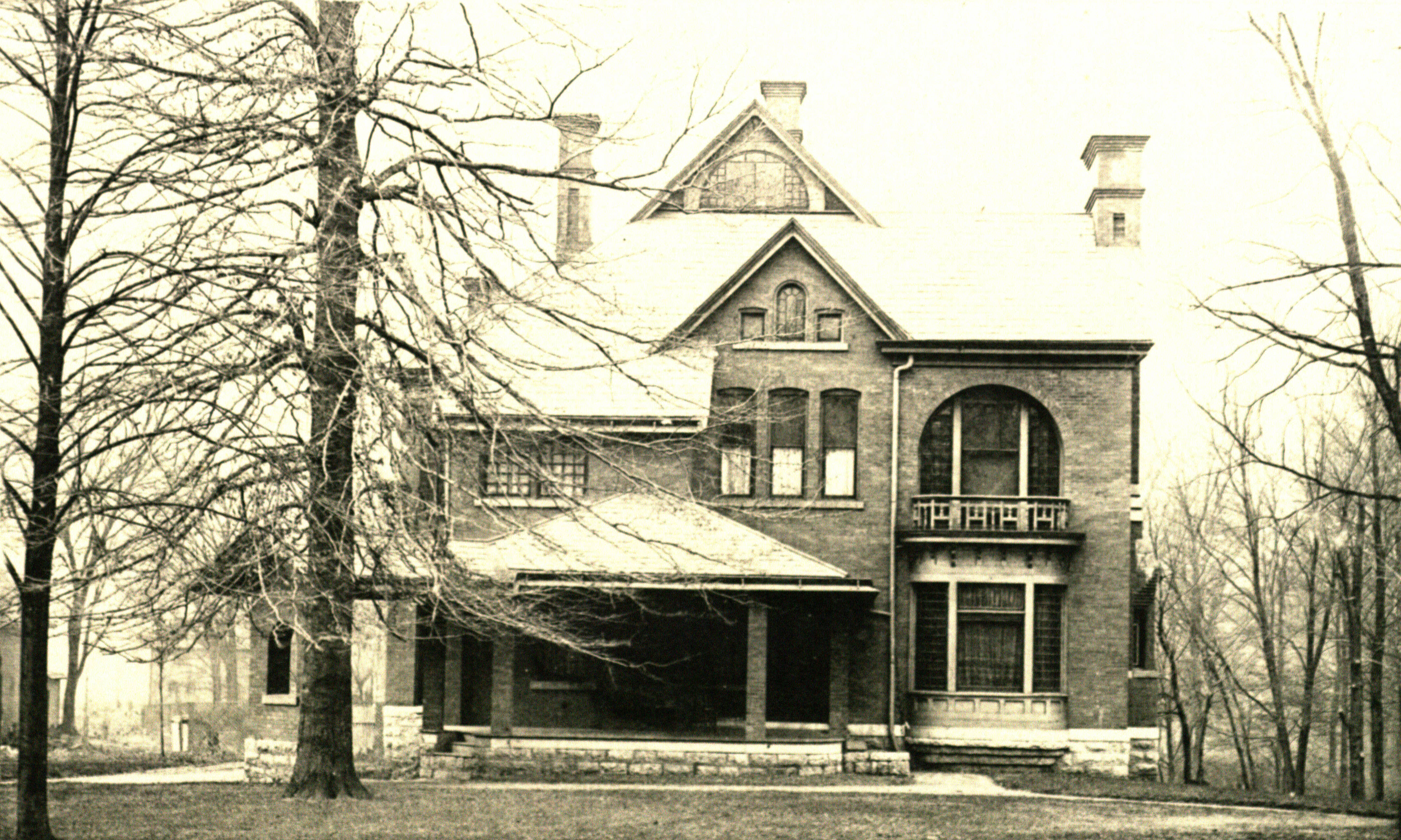
House in Columbus

From 1846 to 1848 Tappan edited the Ohio Press in Columbus, Ohio, a weekly newspaper he founded. He went on to practice law in Steubenville, during which time he served as mayor (1852). He began his career in education in 1857 as a teacher in the public schools and quickly rose to distinction, serving as superintendent, March 1858-June 1859, professor of mathematics at Ohio University, 1859–1860 and 1865–1868, teacher of mathematics at Mount Auburn Young Ladies' Institute, 1860–1865, and president of Kenyon College, 1869-1875. As president he thoroughly revised the curriculum and oversaw completion of the college chapel, the Church of the Holy Spirit. Following his term as president he was Kenyon's professor of mathematics and political economy.

In addition to his administrative and professorial duties, Tappan served as a member of the Ohio State Board of School Examiners in 1864, president of the Ohio State Teachers Association in 1866, and a member of the National Education Association, in which body he also served on the council in 1880, as treasurer from 1880 to 1881, and as president in 1883. He was Ohio's Commissioner of Common Schools from 1887 until his death.

== Works ==
Tappan was the author of a number of mathematical textbooks, including Treatise on Plane and Solid Geometry (1864), Treatise on geometry and trigonometry (1868), Notes and Exercises on Surveying (1878), and Elements of Geometry (1884). Other works include "Inaugural address of Eli T. Tappan, President of the Ohio Teachers' Association," at Zanesville (1866), "School Legislation," a history of the subject in Ohio through 1873, published as part of A History of Education in the State of Ohio (1876), and "On the Complexity of Causes," an address before the Department of Higher Instruction of the National Educational Association at Chautauqua (1880).

=== Papers ===
Tappan's papers can be found in various archival collections, including the Eli T. Tappan family papers, the Benjamin Tappan papers, and the records of the Steubenville Coal and Mining Company, all held at the Ohio Historical Society, and the Charles William Eliot papers in the Clifton Waller Barrett Library, at the University of Virginia Library, Charlottesville, Va.

== General references ==
- Minnich, Harvey C. "Eli Todd Tappan" in Dictionary of American Biography, v. 18. Steward-Trowbridge. New York: Scribner, 1928+.
- Tappan, Daniel Langdon. Tappan-Toppan Genealogy. Arlington, Mass., 1915, pp. 25, 29-30.

| Preceded by James Kent Stone | President of Kenyon College; 1868–1875 | Succeeded by Edward C. Benson |
