= 3rd Colorado Cavalry Regiment =

- National flag of the regiment
- Active: August 20, 1864 – December 31, 1864
- Disbanded: December 31, 1864
- Country: United States
- Allegiance: Union
- Branch: Cavalry
- Garrison/HQ: Denver, Colorado
- Nickname: Bloodless Third
- Engagements: American Civil War: Sand Creek massacre

Commanders
- Notable commanders: Colonel George L. Shoup Colonel John M. Chivington (as District commander)

The 3rd Colorado Cavalry Regiment was a Union Army unit formed in the mid-1860s when increased traffic on the United States emigrant trails and settler encroachment resulted in numerous attacks against them by the Cheyenne and Arapaho. The Hungate massacre and the display in Denver of mutilated victims raised political pressure for the government to protect its people. Governor John Evans sought and gained authorization from the War Department in Washington to found the Third. More a militia than a military unit, the "Bloodless Third" was composed of "100-daysers," that is, volunteers who signed on for 100 days to fight against the Indians. (Its nickname came from its lack of battle experience.) The unit's only commander was Col. George L. Shoup, a politician from Colorado. The regiment was assigned to the District of Colorado commanded by Col. John M. Chivington.

== Early Operations ==
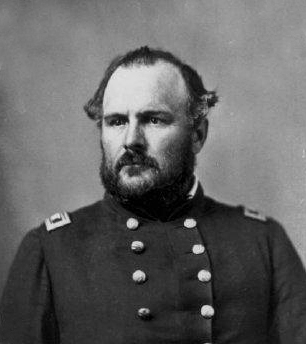
John Chivington

In August 1864, some 100 Boulder County residents joined Company D and trained at Fort Chambers (erected on George W. Chambers' farm), east of present-day Boulder (east of 63rd and Andrus, south of Poor Farm property).

At the Camp Weld Council of September 28, 1864, Evans and Chivington met with five chiefs, including Black Kettle of the Cheyenne and White Antelope of the Arapaho. They had been brought to Denver to parlay for peace under military escort by Major Edward W. Wynkoop, commander of Fort Lyon. The chiefs agreed to peacefully settle their people on the reservation on Big Sandy Creek about 40 miles northwest of Fort Lyon. The reservation was created under the Fort Wise Treaty of 1860. With Wynkoop's assuring their safety, the chiefs settled their bands in a large village at the curve of Sand Creek. Some Indians set up lodges closer to Fort Lyon.

On November 5, Major Wynkoop was removed from command and replaced by an ally of Chivington, Major Scott Anthony. He ordered all Indians camped around the fort to the reservation. On November 26, Wynkoop departed for reassignment to Fort Riley, Kansas.

On November 28, Chivington arrived at Fort Lyon, having traveled in great secrecy with 700 Third Colorado Cavalry and a battalion of the First Colorado Cavalry. Encouraged by Governor Evans and spurred by his own ambitions, Chivington felt pressure to use the "Bloodless Third" before the volunteers' terms expired. He sealed off the fort. Officers loyal to Wynkoop were held at gunpoint. That night, reinforced by artillery from the fort and 125 troops of the First Cavalry, Chivington set off for the Cheyenne-Arapaho village at Sand Creek.

== Sand Creek massacre ==
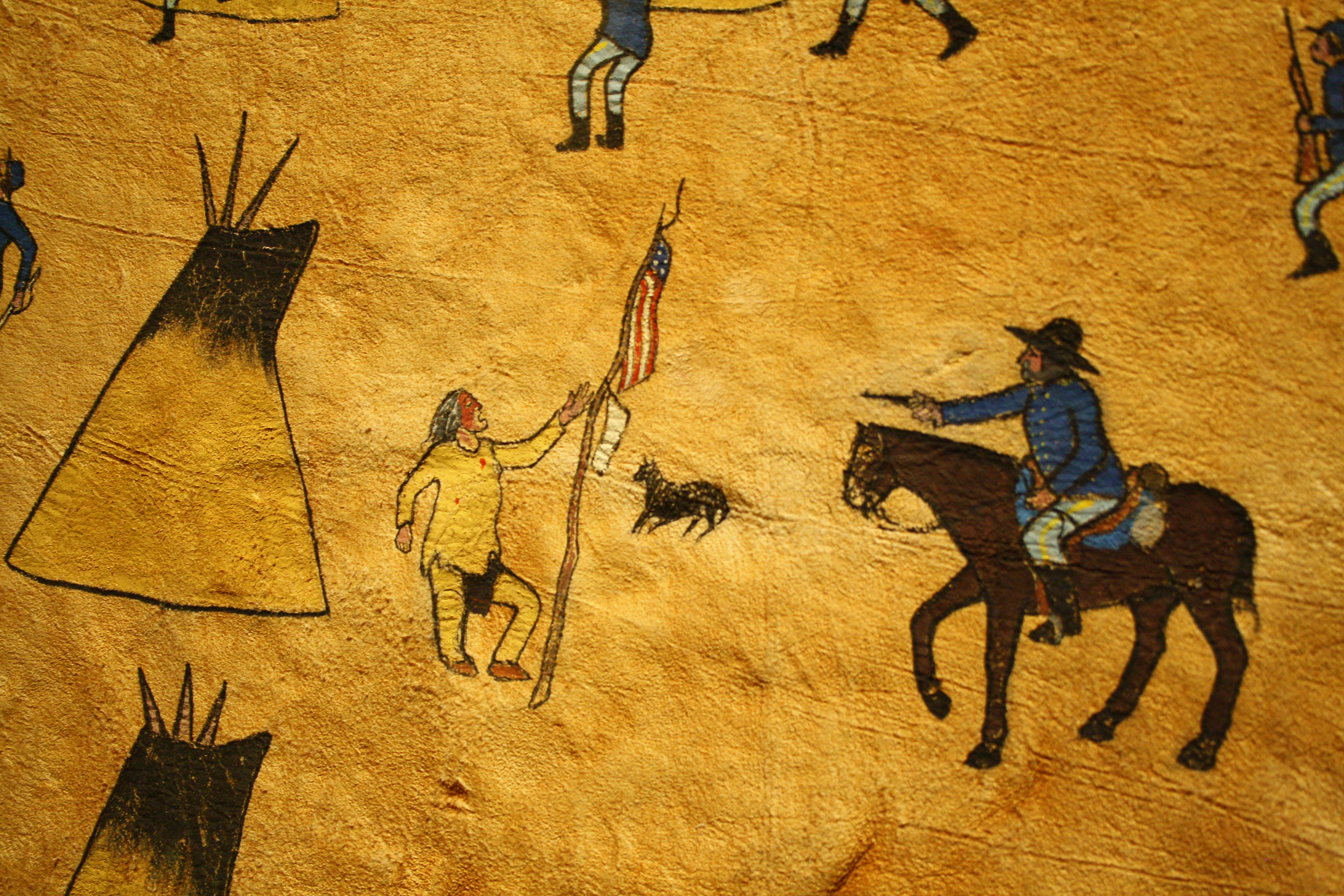
The unit at the Sand Creek massacre

Arriving at dawn on November 29, 1864, the volunteer cavalry attacked. Although Black Kettle had flown an American flag on his tipi to signal peace (as directed by Wynkoop), the volunteers killed indiscriminately. Historians have not agreed on the number killed, but they often cite 150, mostly women and children, as the warriors had gone out on a hunt. The cavalry mutilated some of the corpses, taking body parts as souvenirs.

Now called the "Bloody Third," the regiment returned to Denver in December. It mustered out on December 31, 1864. For months the men displayed the body parts as trophies in Denver saloons. Although Chivington and his forces were lauded by many at the time for a heroic "battle", critics complained about the military conduct of the men.

== Aftermath ==
The US Congress investigated the attack. The hearings were widely covered, leading to national shock and outrage about the brutality of the attack and the betrayal of promises made to the Cheyenne and Arapaho. Because the Native Americans believed the Cheyenne had been targeted by the US, major Sioux and Arapaho bands allied with them from 1865 on to attack the Vehos (whites) and try to drive emigrant settlers out of their lands.

== See also ==
- List of Colorado Territory Civil War units
