= Chivington =

Chivington may refer to:

- John Chivington (1821–1894), a Colonel at the time of the U.S. Civil War who gained infamy for his attack on a peaceful settlement of Native Americans on the plains of Colorado, which became known as the Sand Creek Massacre
- Chivington Drive, a street in Longmont, Colorado, named for Colonel John Chivington, renamed Sunrise Drive in 2005
- Chivington, Colorado, a ghost town in Kiowa County, named for Colonel John Chivington
