= John P. Slough =

American military officer and politician (1829–1867)

John Potts Slough
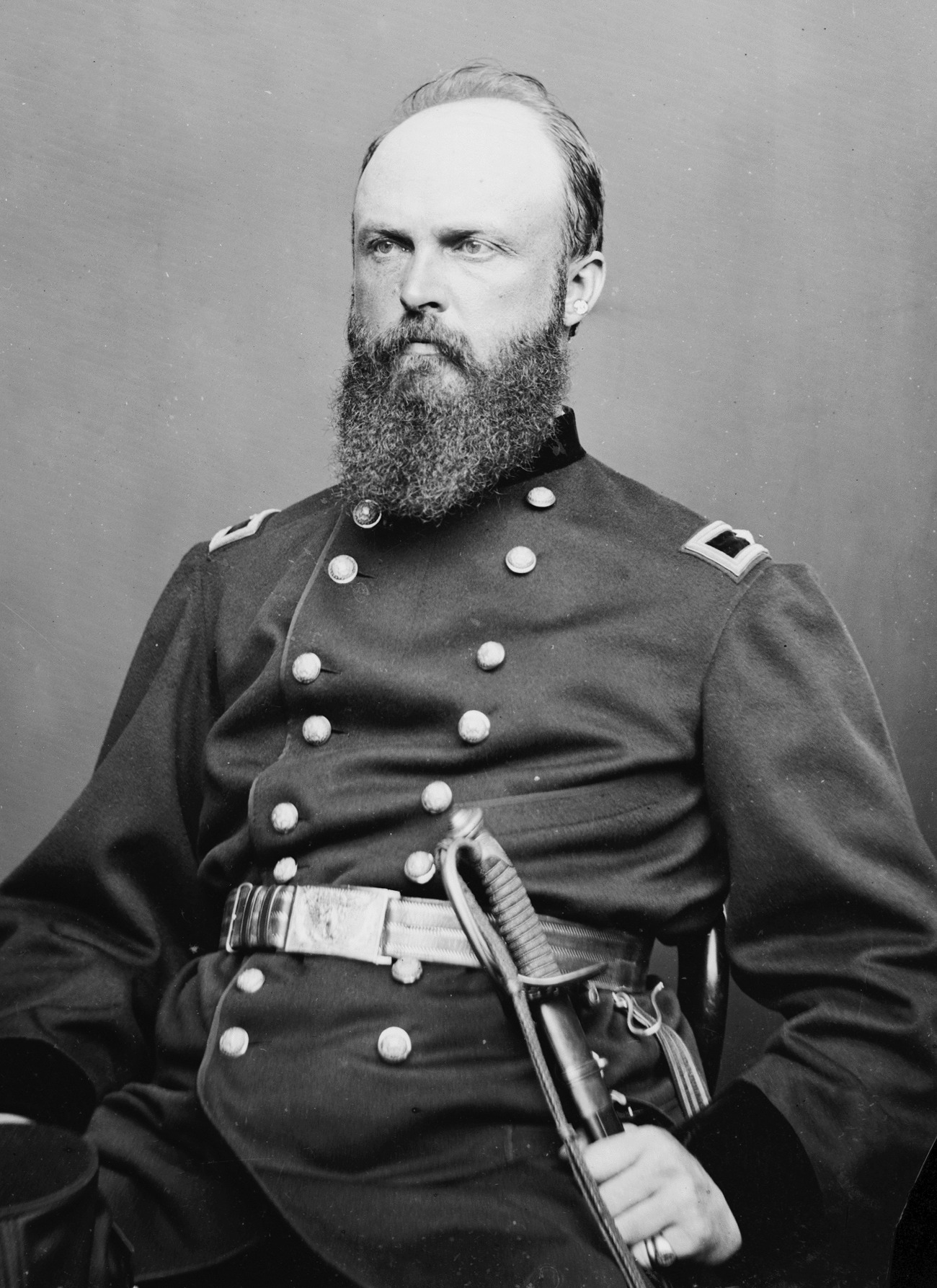
- John Potts Slough
- Born: February 1, 1829; Cincinnati, Ohio, U.S.
- Died: December 17, 1867 (aged 38); Santa Fe, New Mexico Territory, U.S.
- Military career
- Allegiance: United States of America (Union)
- Branch: U.S. Army (Union Army)
- Service years: 1861–1865
- Rank: Brigadier general
- Commands: 1st Colorado Infantry
- Conflicts: American Civil War

John Potts Slough (/ˈslaʊ/; February 1, 1829 – December 17, 1867) was an American general and politician who led Union forces at the Battle of Glorieta Pass during the American Civil War. After the war, he was appointed chief justice of the New Mexico Territorial Supreme Court, serving until his assassination in 1867.

== Early life and career ==
Slough was born in Cincinnati, Ohio, son of a steamboat builder. Educated at the Cincinnati Law School he practiced law in Cincinnati before being elected to the Ohio General Assembly. While serving there, he struck a fellow assemblyman and was expelled for "an act unbecoming of a gentleman." His constituents reelected him to fill his vacant seat. In 1857, he relocated to Leavenworth, Kansas Territory, opened a law office, and entered the fight against the introduction of slavery into the territory during the era of Bleeding Kansas. He served in the Wyandotte Constitution convention—making Kansas a "free" state—and, again, settled a legislative difference with his fists. He moved to Denver, then in the western part of the Territory of Kansas, in 1860 and continued to practice law, becoming one of the city's more distinguished lawyers. With the establishment of the new Colorado Territory in early 1861, he helped organize the courts system, establishment of the bar, and review of professional peers.

== Civil War service ==
In 1861, the Civil War began and Slough immediately began recruiting for the federal army. Colorado Governor William Gilpin appointed him as a captain of the 1st Colorado "Pike's Peakers" Infantry Regiment. Members of his regiment were initially skeptical of his loyalty to the Union due to his association with the Democratic Party. In August 1861, Slough was commissioned colonel in command of the regiment. In 1862, a Confederate army was invading the New Mexico Territory, had defeated Col. Edward R. S. Canby's troops at the Battle of Valverde, and captured Albuquerque and the capital of Santa Fe. Coming to the aid of the Union forces in New Mexico, Slough marched his regiment to Fort Union and, as the senior ranking officer, assumed command of the post and its New Mexico Volunteers.

A Confederate force under Lt. Col. William Read Scurry was moving to capture Fort Union. Col. Slough marched his regiment toward Glorieta Pass to intercept Scurry. On March 26, 1862, an advanced unit met the Confederates at Apache Canyon, an inconclusive skirmish ensued. Two days later, on March 28, the armies met at Pigeon's Ranch on the Santa Fe Trail below Glorieta Pass. Slough and Scurry fought an initially indecisive action at the Battle of Glorieta Pass. The Texans were pushing the Coloradans back, but the battle was turned to a victory for the Union after Slough sent Major John M. Chivington on a flank attack which destroyed the Confederate's supply train. The battle was considered a Union strategic victory but a Confederate tactical victory. Slough's regiment had stopped the advance of the Confederates, who soon abandoned New Mexico and retreated back to Texas.

Following the battle, Slough received direct orders from Canby to remain at Fort Union. Though dated and sent before the battle while the Confederate army divided Canby and Slough's communication line, the order has been debated as confirmation or not that Slough had disobeyed Canby's orders by leaving Fort Union in the first place. Slough met with Canby, determined the war in New Mexico was over, resigned his commission, and immediately headed to the Eastern theater. At the first anniversary after the Battle of Glorieta Pass, his former Colorado troops sent him a gold inlaid sword as thanks for making the rag tag volunteers into a fighting force. In response, Slough wrote: “Remember the holy character of the cause in which you are engaged. Remember that you are American soldiers, battling in the cause of universal freedom.”

Through his wife's McLean family ties (the chief justice of the U. S. Supreme Court was a relative), Slough went to Washington, D.C., where he was given command of a brigade in the Shenandoah Valley during Stonewall Jackson's Valley Campaign of 1862. His forces were stationed at Harpers Ferry and saw little action. He was appointed brigadier general of volunteers of August 25, 1862, and became the military governor of Alexandria, Virginia. For the rest of the war, he commanded the District of Alexandria. In December 1862, he sat on the court-martial that convicted Maj. Gen. Fitz John Porter of disobedience and misconduct.

== Postbellum career ==
When the Civil War ended in 1865, Slough resigned his commission and opened a law office in Washington, D. C. In January 1866, United States President Andrew Johnson appointed him to serve as chief justice of the New Mexico Territorial Court. One of his first and most personal acts was to seek funds to mark the graves of the Union dead and place monuments at the Civil War battle sites of Valverde, Apache Canyon, and Glorieta Pass, New Mexico (only one in Santa Fe was erected). He also arrived to reform the legal system. Among the cases with the greatest impact was his decision that Pueblo Indians were U. S. citizens, could testify in his courts, especially in land disputes, and were equals in the eyes of the court, a decision that was eventually upheld by the U. S. Supreme Court. In February, 1867, he attacked the system of peonage in New Mexico in anticipation of the Federal law against debt peonage—involuntary servitude—signed by President Johnson March 2, 1867. His career was that of a reformer, and he considered what he found in New Mexico was akin to the slavery he had fought in the Civil War.

Many New Mexicans sought his removal, because of these destabilizing decisions but also for his efforts to correct court room antics, especially after a decision against an old padron for selling liquor to Indians. A local jury would not convict; he removed them and held a new trial. After Slough sentenced the padron to a year in prison, the territorial governor pardoned him, which sent Slough into a tirade.

Sharp-tongued with a fiery temper, he was appointed to fight corruption, but observers thought he was too heavy-handed about it. In 1867 William Logan Rynerson, a member of the Territorial Legislative Council, took part in a campaign to denigrate the judge and authored a resolution in the legislature to have the judge removed, leading Slough to slander Rynerson publicly.

== Death ==
On December 15, 1867, Rynerson drew a gun on the judge in Santa Fe and said, "Take it back." Slough exclaimed, "Shoot and be damned!" and Rynerson fired. Mortally wounded, Slough drew a derringer but was unable to fire. He died two days later.

=== Aftermath ===
In a mockery of a trial, Rynerson was found not guilty (by reason of self-defense), an example of the growing power of what became known as the Republican-controlled Santa Fe Ring. Outcries for a nonpartisan investigation were ignored over the protests of friends in New Mexico, Denver, and Cincinnati. The historian Richard Henry Brown says that the murder of Slough "helped affirm the position of New Mexico as 'apparently the only place where assassination became an integral part of the political system.'"

== See also ==
- List of assassinated American politicians
- List of American Civil War generals (Union)
