= Edward W. Wynkoop =

American military officer (1836–1891)

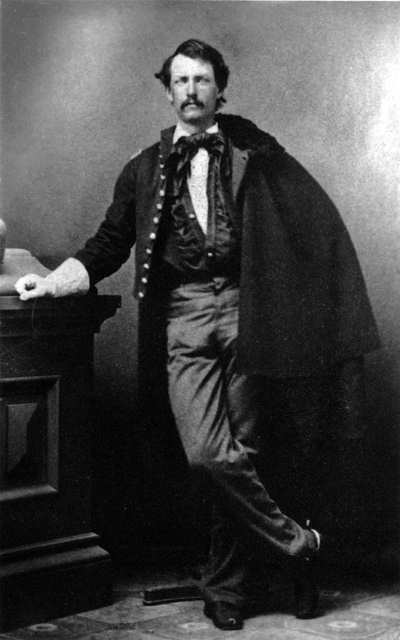
- Edward W. Wynkoop, in Denver, Colorado Territory, Appx. 1865
- Born: June 19, 1836; Philadelphia, Pennsylvania, US
- Died: September 11, 1891 (aged 55); Santa Fe, New Mexico, New Mexico, US
- Burial place: Santa Fe National Cemetery
- Spouse: Louise Wakely (married August 1861)
- Military career
- Service years: 1860s
- Rank: US Army Colonel

Edward Wanshear Wynkoop (June 19, 1836 – September 11, 1891) was a US Army officer during the American Civil War and later an Indian agent. He was a founder of the city of Denver, Colorado. Wynkoop Street in Denver is named after him.

== History ==
Edward Wanshaer "Ned" Wynkoop was born on June 19, 1836, in Philadelphia, Pennsylvania, the youngest of eight, to John Wanshaer Wynkoop (1794-1837) and his mother was Angelina Catharine Estill (1803-1877). He was the great-grandson of Continental Congress member, Judge Henry Wynkoop. He had five sons and three daughters with Louise Brown Wakely between 1862 and 1878. His grandson was noted architect Francis W. Wynkoop.

Wynkoop was appointed the first sheriff of Arapahoe County, Kansas Territory (entire NE quarter of present State of Colorado) on September 21, 1858.

Wynkoop served as an officer in the First Colorado Volunteer Cavalry during the American Civil War, attaining the rank of major of volunteers, and was brevetted a lieutenant colonel in May 1865.

== Command at Fort Lyon ==
Wynkoop was placed in command of Fort Lyon where tensions were high between the threat of Confederate attack and inflamed tensions with the Cheyenne brought about by attacks on the Cheyenne by US soldiers. As the threat of Confederate troops lessened and tensions with the Cheyenne increased, Chivington, who was Wynkoop's superior, gradually shifted his concern towards the perceived threat from Cheyenne war parties. Cheyenne war parties joined forces with Arapaho and Sioux bands and launched attacks on settlers.

In response to a letter by George Bent asking for peace delegations and a hostage exchange. Wynkoop, with an escort of 127 men, two cannons, and the accompaniment of Ochinee arrived at a tense peace negotiation. Despite initial signs of hostility, Wynkoop managed to secure four settlers who had been taken hostage and a pledge of the present chiefs, notably among them Black-Kettle, to a future meeting with Governor John Evans. Unfortunately, unbeknownst to Wynkoop, Evens and army command had soured at the idea of a peace treaty.

While Governor Evans initially opposed meeting with the tribal chiefs, Wynkoop publicly delivered the chiefs to Evans, forcing Evans to meet with them at the risk of scandal. However despite what Wynkoop and the tribal chiefs present at the meeting believed, neither Evans or Major General Curtis had any desire for peace. After Wynkoop's return to Fort Lyon, he was stripped of his command in favor of Major Anthony and soon after transferred to division headquarters in Fort Riley, Kansas to answer for an accusation of abandoning his post for his initial meeting with the Cheyenne.

== After Fort Lyon ==
After being transferred to Fort Riley, Wynkoop was alerted to the Sand Creek massacre by his friend, Captain Silas Soule, who commanded Company D, 1st Colorado Cavalry, which was present at Sand Creek on November 29, 1864, when Soule refused an order to join the massacre. On behalf of the U.S. Army Wynkoop later investigated Col. John M. Chivington's conduct at Sand Creek, which led to Chivington's condemnation.

In 1866, Wynkoop became an Indian agent for the Southern Cheyennes and Arapaho, resigning in December 1868 in protest of the destruction of Black Kettle's village in the Battle of Washita River. He later became warden of the New Mexico penitentiary.

Edward lived with his wife and eight children in Santa Fe, New Mexico, between about 1885 and 1891, during which time he was Warden of the New Mexico Penitentiary.

== Death ==
Wynkoop died on September 11, 1891, in Santa Fe, New Mexico, at the age of 55. He was buried there.

== Notes ==
- Hardorff, Richard G., compiler & editor (2006). Washita Memories: Eyewitness Views of Custer's Attack on Black Kettle's Village. Norman, OK: University of Oklahoma Press. ISBN 0-8061-3759-2.
