= Silas Soule =

American abolitionist and military officer (1838–1865)

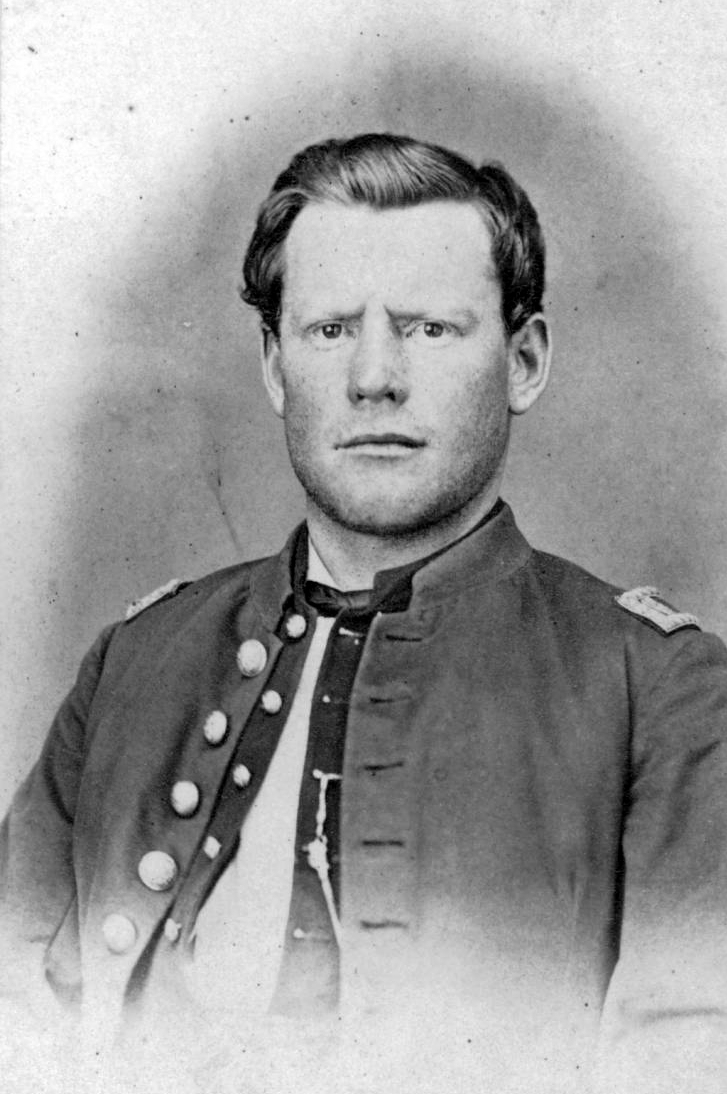
- Captain Silas Soule c. 1864
- Born: Silas Stillman Soule; July 26, 1838; Bath, Maine, United States
- Died: April 23, 1865 (aged 26); Denver City, Colorado Territory, United States
- Cause of death: Assassination by Gunshot
- Burial place: Riverside Cemetery (Denver, Colorado)
- Spouse: Hersa A. Coberly (m. 1865)
- Military career
- Allegiance: United States
- Branch: U.S. Army (Union Army)
- Service years: 1861–1865
- Rank: Captain; Brevet Major (posthumous)
- Units: 1st Colorado Infantry; 1st Colorado Cavalry
- Commands: Company D, 1st Colorado Cavalry
- Conflicts: American Civil War: Battle of Glorieta Pass; Indian Wars: Sand Creek massacre
- Other work: Provost marshal, Denver City, Colorado Territory (1865)

Signature
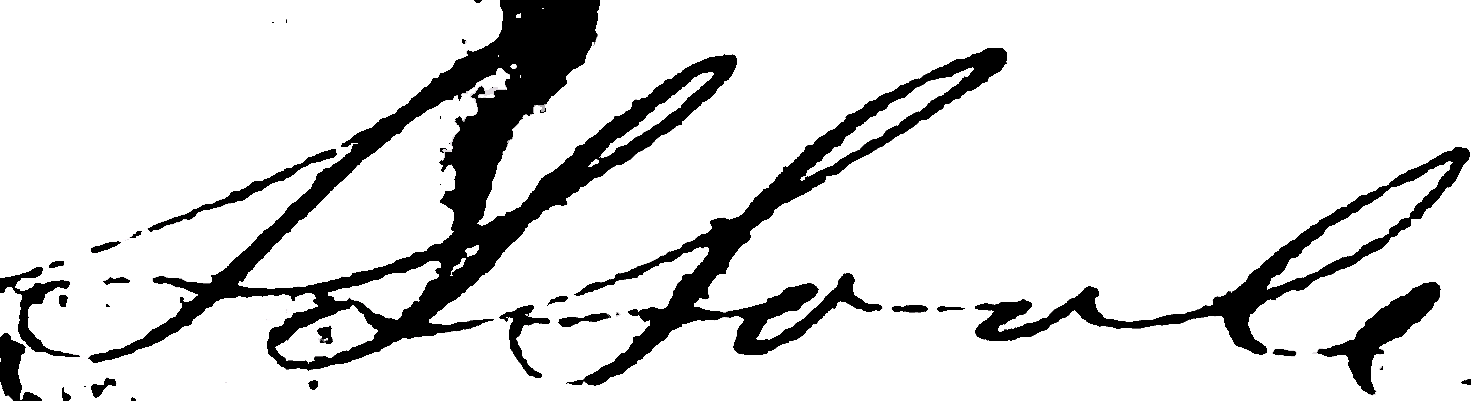

Silas Stillman Soule (/soʊl/ SOHL; July 26, 1838 – April 23, 1865) was an American abolitionist, teenage conductor on the Underground Railroad, military officer, and early example of what would later be called a "whistleblower". He is honored as a hero for disobeying orders to participate in a massacre of Native Americans, and then giving evidence against his commander despite threats on his life.

As a Kansas Jayhawker, he supported and was a proponent of John Brown's movement in the time of strife leading up to the American Civil War. During the war, Soule joined the Colorado volunteers and rose to the rank of captain in the Union Army. Soule was present at the Sand Creek massacre in 1864, commanding the 1st Colorado Cavalry, Company D, but refused to take part in the killing, and ordered his men not to harm the Native Americans. Afterward, he testified about the massacre at a military hearing. Another soldier murdered Soule two months later, in what some believed was retaliation. Soule's assassination at age 26 brought a tide of outrage on his behalf and sympathy for his widow.

== Early life ==
Silas Soule was born on July 26, 1838, in Bath, Maine, the son of Amasa Soule, a cooper, and Sophia (Low) Soule. He was born into a family of abolitionists, and was descended from Mayflower passenger George Soule. He was raised in Maine and Massachusetts. Soule was a "friendly, intelligent, and good-natured young man, full of practical jokes, [and] tall tales[.]" In 1854, his family became part of the newly formed New England Emigrant Aid Company, an organization whose goal was to help settle the Kansas Territory and bring it into the Union as a free state. His father and older brother William arrived in the vicinity of modern-day Lawrence in November 1854, and became one of the town's founding families. The teenage Silas, his mother, and two sisters came the following summer.

Shortly after the family's arrival at Coal Creek located a few miles south of Lawrence, (Note: Coal Creek is near present-day Vinland) Silas's father, Amasa, established his household as a stop on the Underground Railroad. At the age of 17, Silas escorted escaped slaves from Missouri north to freedom. (Note: Silas' sister, Anne [née Soule] Prentiss, told of her family's early experience in Maine, Massachusetts, and Kansas in a 1929 interview: "Our house was on the 'Underground Railway'. John Brown was often there... My brother, Silas, and Brown were close friends. Silas went out on many a foray with him. I recall well when Brown came to our cabin one night with thirteen slaves: men, women and children. He had run them away from Missouri. Brown left them with us. Father would always take in all the Negroes he could. Silas took the whole thirteen from our home eight miles to Mr. Grover's stone barn...")

== Strife in Kansas ==
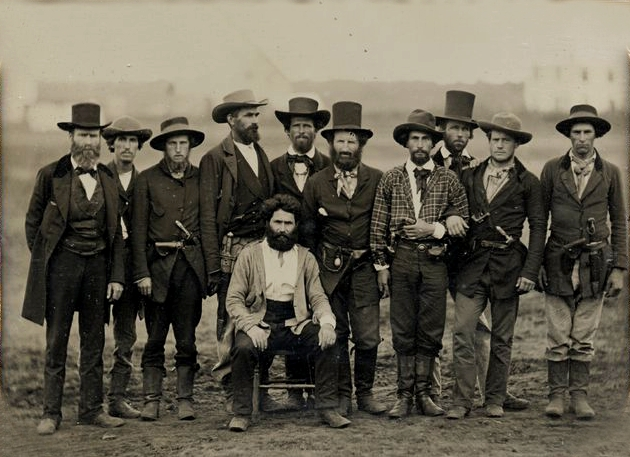
The "Immortal Ten": the John Doy rescue party, 1859. Twenty-year-old Silas Soule is the second man from the right.

During the late 1850s, pro-slavery forces from Missouri and abolitionist forces from Kansas were engaged in open warfare. The conflict was over whether Kansas would be admitted to the Union as a slave or free state. This period was often called "Bleeding Kansas". On January 25, 1859, twenty pro-slavery men had crossed into Kansas to look for escaped slaves. They located and ambushed an Underground Railroad party led by Dr. John Doy, a physician in Lawrence, who was escorting 13 former slaves (Note: The party comprised eight men, three women, and two children) to Iowa. The men from Missouri arrested Dr. Doy and sold the former slaves.

Doy, meanwhile, was tried and convicted of abducting slaves and sentenced to five years in a Missouri penitentiary. Because he was awaiting transfer to the prison at the jailhouse in St. Joseph, Soule and a group of men from Lawrence decided they would free him. Soule went into the jail and convinced the jailkeeper that he had a letter from Doy's wife. The note in fact read: "Tonight, at twelve o'clock." Later that night they overpowered the jailer and helped Doy escape back to Kansas. Thereafter known as "The Immortal Ten", when they reached Lawrence they had their photo taken (above left). (Note: This photo of "The Immortal Ten" is now held by the Kansas State Historical Society)

== John Brown's men ==
After John Brown was captured following the raid on Harper's Ferry, Soule once again found himself planning a jailbreak. In February 1860, after Brown had been tried, convicted, and executed, Soule visited Brown's followers, Albert Hazlett and Aaron Dwight Stevens, jailed at Charles Town, (then in Virginia), and offered to help the men escape. As part of this plan, Soule posed as a drunken Irishman, got himself arrested for brawling, and was put into the Charles Town jail for the night. He managed to charm the jailer into letting him out of his cell for a short while during which he contacted the two prisoners. Hazlett, and Stevens, however, both refused to be sprung from the jail, choosing instead to become martyrs for the cause. They were both hanged on March 16, 1860. After his release from the Charles Town jail, Soule traveled to Boston, where he often met with various abolitionists and befriended the poet Walt Whitman.

== Life in Colorado and the Civil War ==
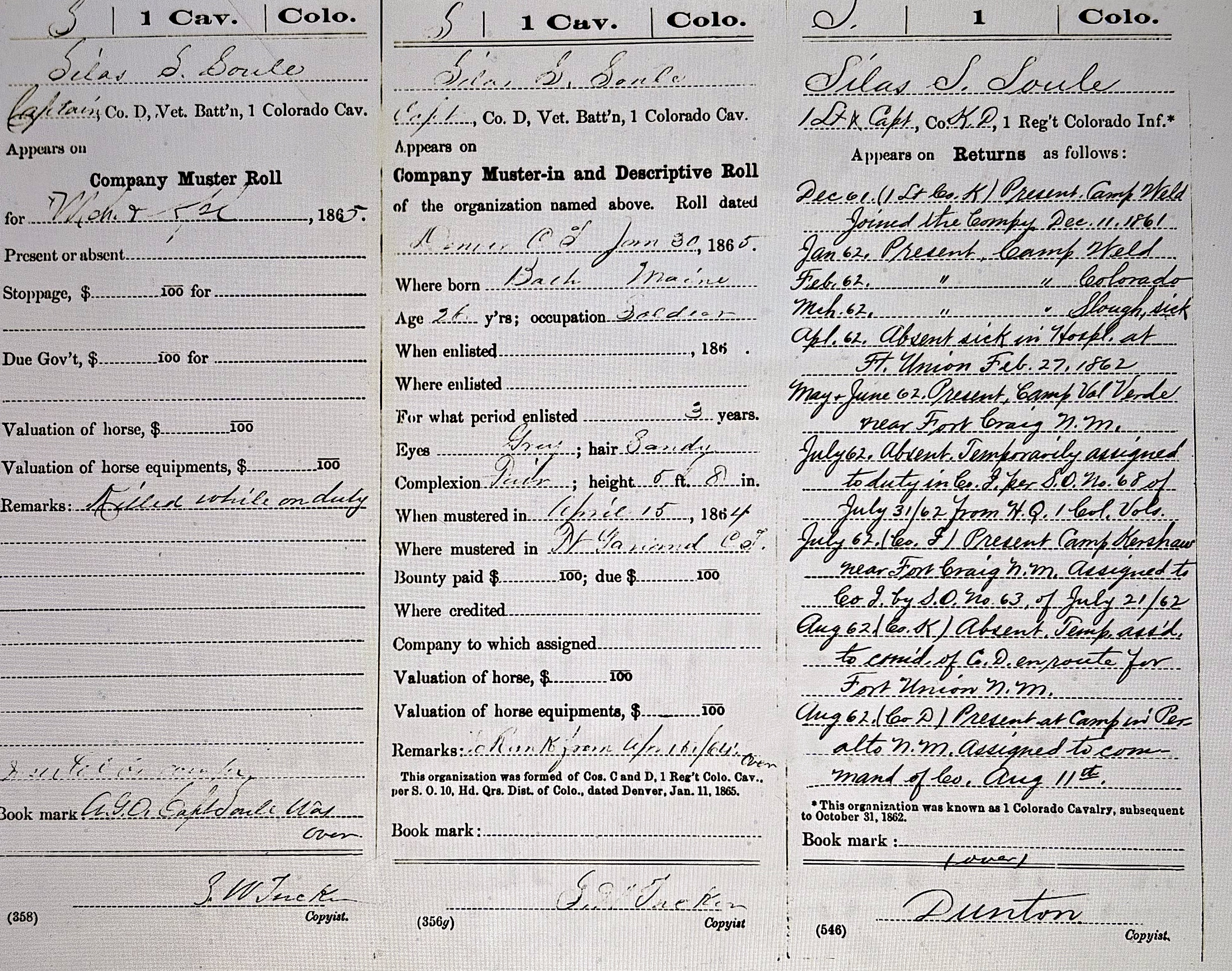
Silas Soule's military record (1865)

Later in 1860, Soule—along with his brother William, and a cousin—was restless, and went west to the gold fields in Colorado where he dug for gold and worked in a blacksmith shop. In December 1861, after the start of the Civil War, Soule enlisted in Company K; 1st Colorado Infantry, (Note: Company K, 1st Colorado Infantry were the first regiment of Colorado volunteers) and took part in the New Mexico campaign of 1862, including the key Battle of Glorieta Pass. In November 1864, he was assigned the command of Company D, 1st Colorado Cavalry Regiment.

=== Sand Creek Massacre ===
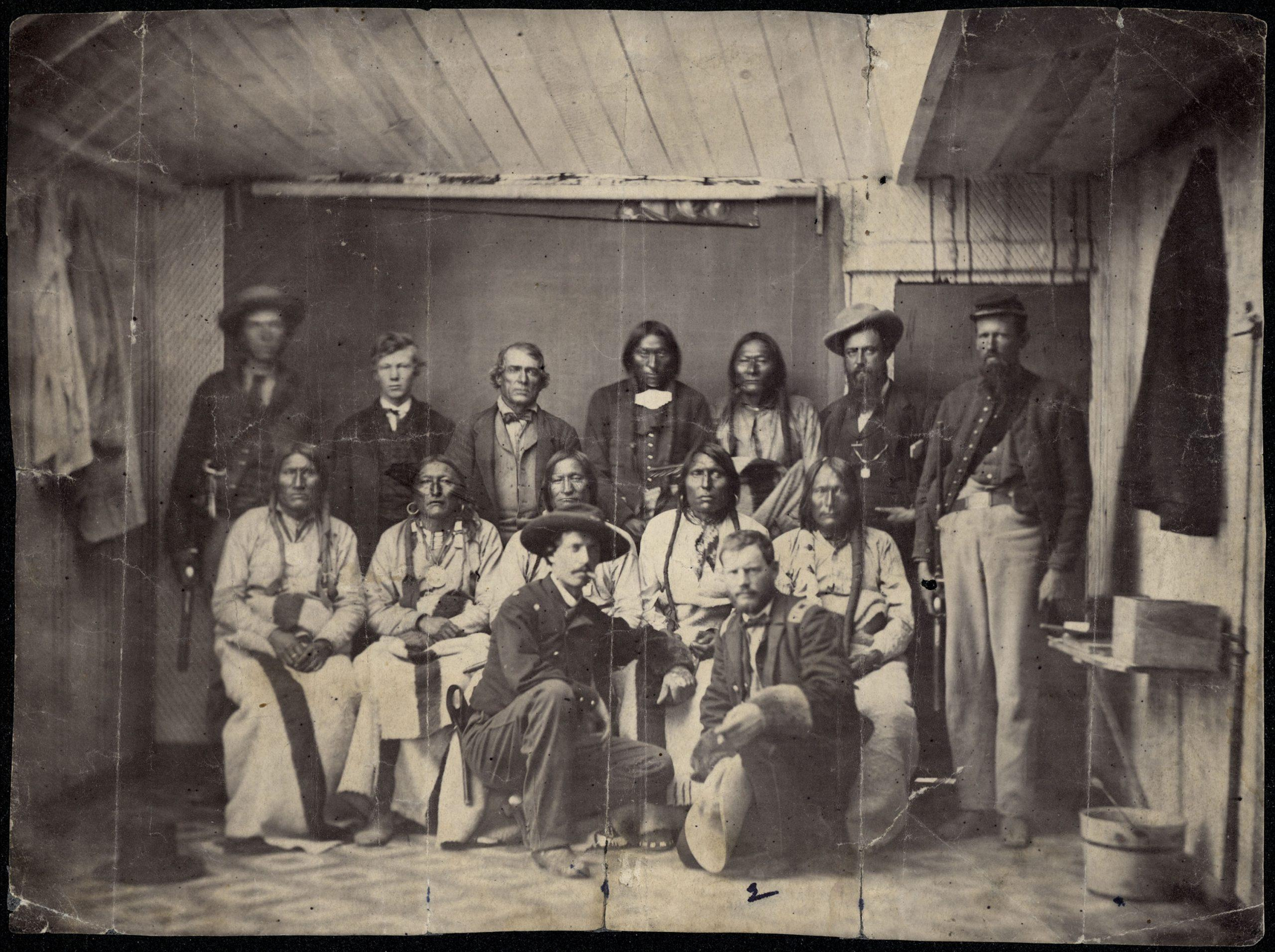
Capt. Soule (kneeling front row, far right) with Major Edward W. Wynkoop (front row, left) and Southern Cheyenne Chief Black Kettle at the Camp Weld meeting September 28, 1864. (Note: Wynkoop, in retrospect, regretted arranging the meeting between Chief Black Kettle (second row, third from left in picture above), and himself.)

On November 29, 1864, at Sand Creek, in what was then the southeastern corner of Colorado Territory, Colonel John Chivington ordered the Third Colorado Cavalry to attack Southern Cheyenne Chief Black Kettle's encampment of Southern Cheyenne. Before the attack, Soule told other officers "any man who would take part in [such] murders, knowing the circumstances as we did, was a low lived cowardly son of a bitch." Several lieutenants also objected to Chivington's plans. Lt. Joseph Cramer and Soule went directly to Major Scott Anthony, Chivington's superior.

As the attack began, Soule reminded his troops that the supposed "enemy" was a peace chief's band, and some responded that they "would not fire a shot today". His company did not follow the orders given to them to enter the creek bed leading to the settlement but moved up and down the banks and observed the slaughter. Soule and the men under his command did not participate in the killings.

After the attack, in Chivington's telegram reporting his "victory" he condemned Soule for "saying that he thanked God he killed no Indians, and like expressions, proving himself more in sympathy with the Indians that the whites."

The U.S. Congress created a congressional committee to investigate the Sand Creek Massacre due to a nationwide outrage of the incident. Soule's and others' verbal and written testimonies about the Sand Creek Massacre contributed to Colorado's second territorial governor John Evans's dismissal, and the U.S. Congress refusing the U.S. Army's repeated requests for a general war against the Plains Indians.

== Personal life and family ==
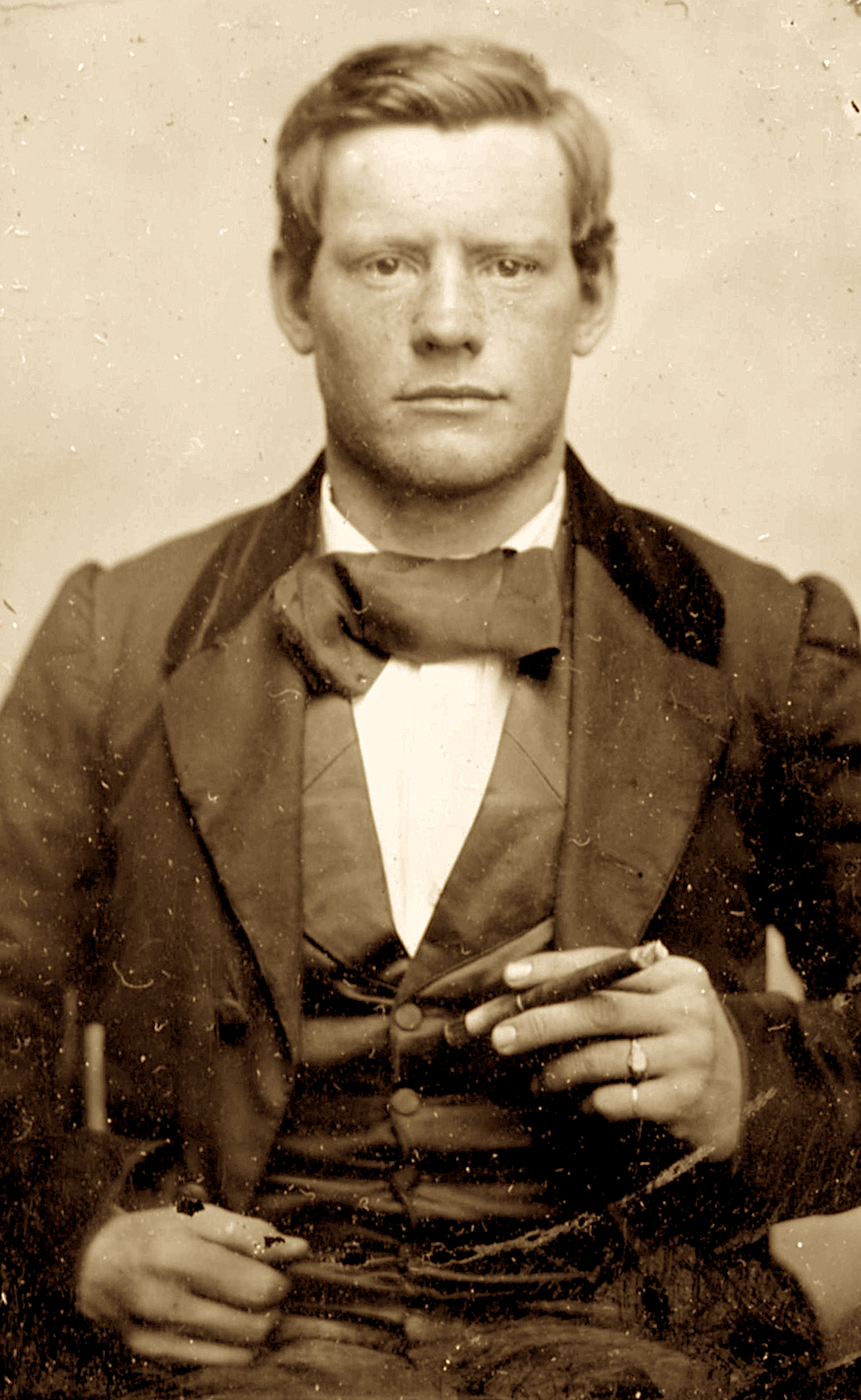
Soule dressed for his wedding, April 1, 1865, 22 days before his murder

Described as "[h]andsome and headstrong", Soule was "a great favorite with the men of his own military company" and could express a "devilish sense of humor", being able to "slither under the thickest skin of pro-slavery or Union supporter alike, with his sharp tongue, cynical nature and charming wit; [being] wise beyond his years and able to separate the wheat from the chaff on matters of politics".

On April 1, 1865, Soule married Hersa Coberly; the marriage lasted just twenty-two days before he was murdered. Following his death, his widow remarried. She and her second husband, Alfred Lea, became the parents of the adventurer, author, and geopolitical strategist Homer Lea. Like Soule, she is buried in Denver's Riverside Cemetery.

== Death ==
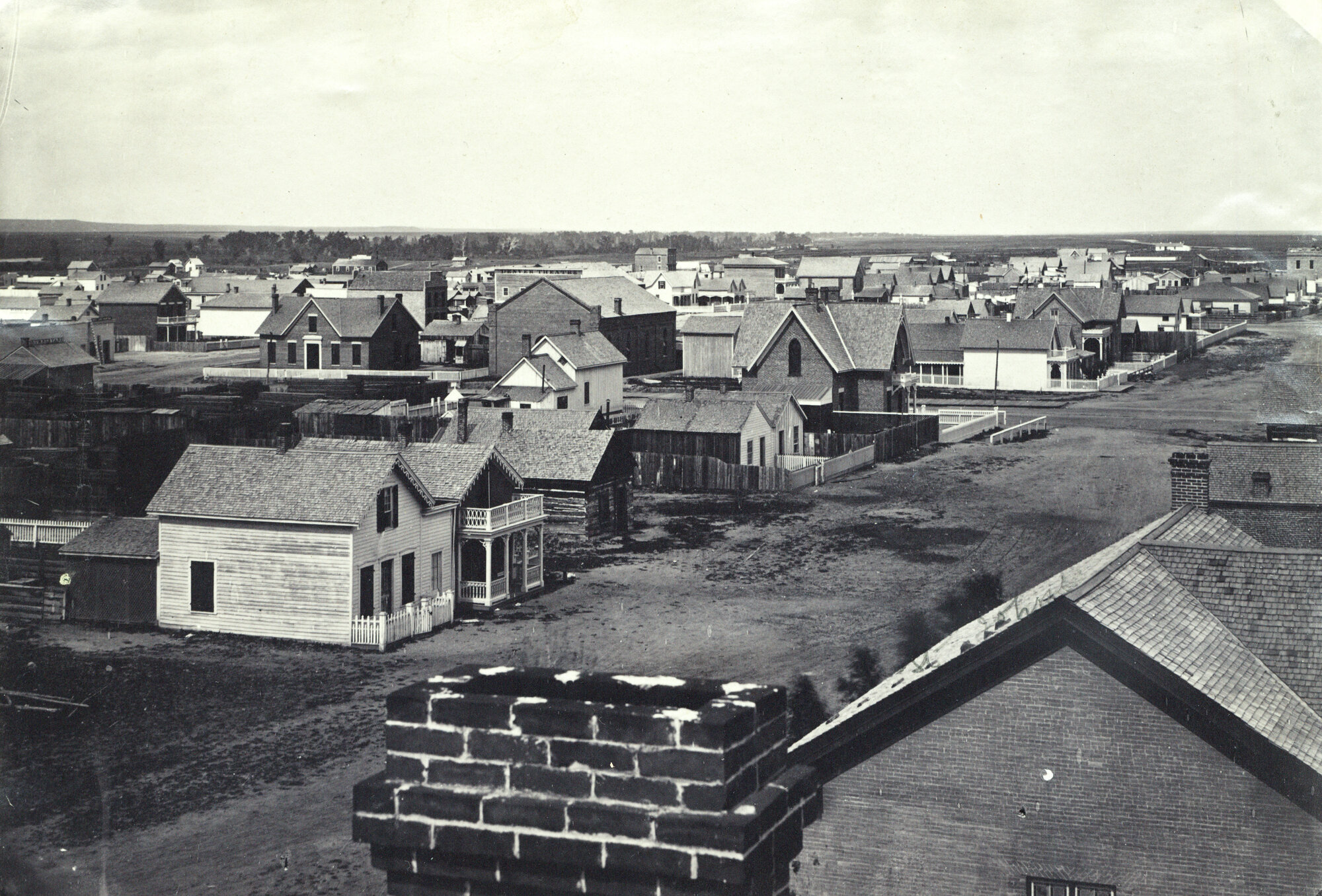
An 1864 view toward site of Soule's murder the following year, at the corner of F (now 15th) (running horizontally at the far intersection) and Arapahoe Streets (foreground)

On April 23, 1865, two months after testifying before a U.S. military commission investigating the Sand Creek Massacre, Soule was on duty as provost marshal in Denver City, when he went to investigate guns being fired. At around 10:30 p.m., with his pistol out, Soule faced Charles Squier; the two men eventually standing only about four feet apart. The final act of Soule's life perhaps was intended to be an act of mercy; Soule fired a shot that wounded only Squier's left arm. Squier then fired a bullet that entered Soule's right cheek, mortally wounding him. The murder occurred on what is now 15th Street between Lawrence and Arapahoe Streets. Soule was dead before help could arrive. Squier dropped his pistol and, with an accomplice, ran before he could be arrested by the authorities. Soule's death occurred two weeks after the end of the Civil War and eight days after the assassination of Abraham Lincoln.

Squier was eventually caught and brought back to Denver City for a court-martial. However, the officer who captured Squier was found dead in a hotel with what was presumed to be a staged drug overdose, and Squier escaped to New York, where his influential family lived. Once there he held various jobs, and tried to rejoin the Army, but was rejected. Squier then fled to Central America to avoid the law. His legs were crushed in a railroad accident, and he died from gangrene in 1869. Despite his crime, he was buried in New York with honors.

== Remembrance ==
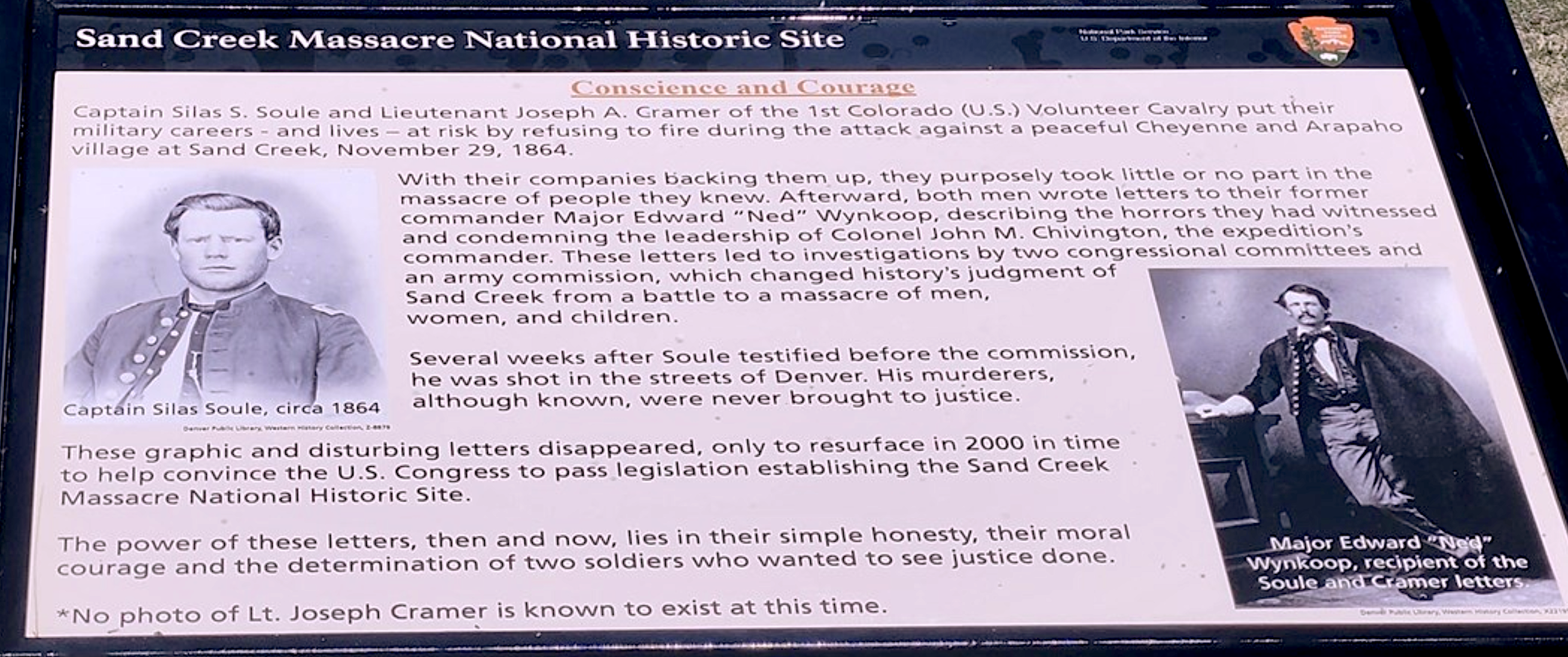
Marker at the Sand Creek Massacre National Historic site in Colorado, USA

Soule's funeral on April 26, 1865, was attended by a large crowd, with military and civil dignitaries. A journalist described the funeral as "the finest ever seen in this country." In 1867, Soule was posthumously brevetted to the rank of major, in recognition of his meritorious service.

Soule was first buried at Denver City Cemetery (now the location of Cheesman Park). A large memorial stone was erected above his grave. The cemetery later closed and many bodies, including Soule's, were transferred to Riverside Cemetery in Denver. Soule was translated to the Grand Army of the Republic portion of Riverside in May 1886, where he is still buried. Soule's large memorial stone was not moved with his remains, and he now has a standard soldier's gravestone.

=== Recognition in Congress ===
On October 6, 1998, Senator Ben Nighthorse Campbell of Colorado spoke in the United States Senate about the Sand Creek Massacre National Historic Site Study Act of 1998, specifically honoring Silas Soule, with these remarks:

"Finally, on this occasion I want to pay a long overdue tribute to one young Coloradan, Captain Silas S. Soule, whose actions over one hundred and thirty years ago saved many innocent Cheyenne and Arapaho lives on that fateful day at Sand Creek. . . .

"While the Sand Creek Massacre was at first hailed as a great victory, Captain Soule was determined to make the horrific truth of the massacre known. . . . Soule refused to compromise himself and made his voice heard through reports that reached all the way from Colorado to Washington, and even to the floor of the U.S. Senate. . . .

"During hearings in Denver, Captain Soule's integrity and unwavering testimony turned the tide against the once popular Chivington and the other men who participated in the massacre and mutilations at Sand Creek. Captain Soule fully realized that telling the truth about the massacre could cost him his life, even telling a good friend that he fully expected to be killed for his testimony. He was right. . . . Silas Soule's funeral, held just a few weeks after his wedding, was one of the most attended in Denver up until that time. While Captain Silas Soule's name has largely faded into history, he stands out as one of the few bright rays of light in the moral darkness that surrounds the Sand Creek Massacre. He should be remembered."

=== Recognition in Colorado ===
From 1998 to 2019, a Spiritual Healing Run/Walk was held in November to honor those killed at Sand Creek (after an interruption due to the COVID-19 pandemic, the Run began again in 2024). It began at the Sand Creek Massacre National Historic Site in southeastern Colorado and concluded on the west steps of the Colorado State Capitol. Starting in 2003, a memorial ceremony was also held at Soule's grave site, and in addition in later years at a Denver high-rise building where a memorial plaque honoring Soule was installed adjacent to Skyline Park, near the location of his murder. The marker is 100 feet from 15th Street and about 100 feet from Arapahoe Street, behind a black pillar supporting the building at that location.

The inscription on the memorial plaque says:

"At (Note: The Rocky Mountain News of April 24, 1865 (p. 2, c. 1), reported that Soule died directly in front of a Dr. Cunningham's house, which was at the corner of 15th and Arapahoe.) this location on April 23, 1865, assassins shot and killed 1st Colorado Cavalry Officer Capt. Silas S. Soule. During the infamous Sand Creek Massacre of November 29, 1864, Soule had disobeyed orders by refusing to fire on Chief Black Kettle's peaceful Cheyenne and Arapaho village. Later, at Army hearings, Soule testified against his commander, Col. John M. Chivington, detailing the atrocities committed by the troops at Sand Creek. His murderers were never brought to justice."

== Legacy ==
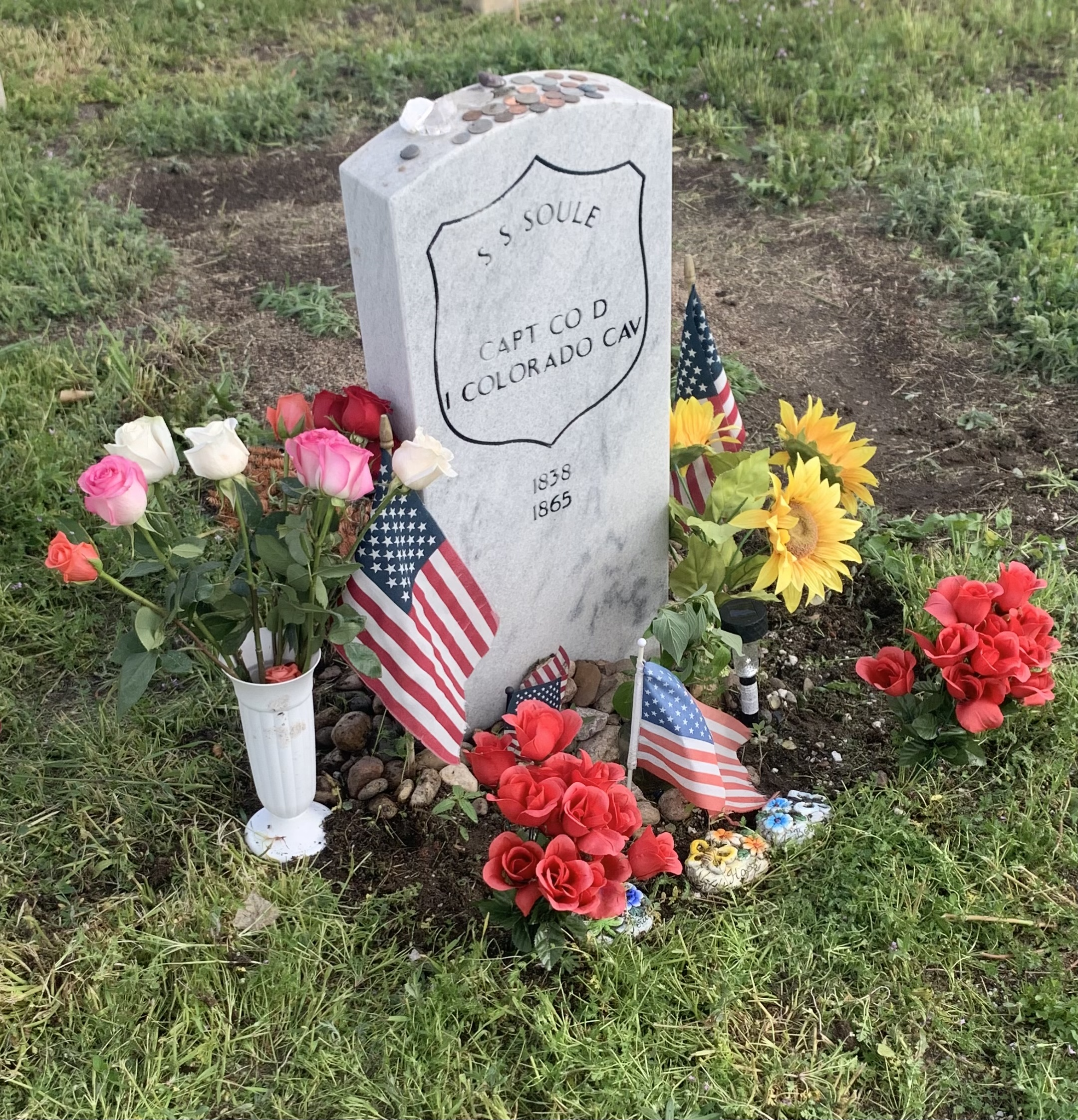
Soule's grave at Riverside Cemetery in Denver

Soule's name has been proposed as a replacement name for several locations in Colorado. Soule was among several proposals submitted to the U.S. Board on Geographic Names to rename Mount Evans. The USBGN chose the name Mount Blue Sky. A creek in Chaffee County (whose name previously included an offensive slur) was also proposed to the USBGN to be named for Soule, but the USBGN chose the name for a nearby geological site. In 2022, Soule's name was also submitted to the USBGN to replace Pingree Park, Pingree Road and Pingree Hill after Colorado State University renamed its nearby campus Colorado State University Mountain Campus.

About Soule's legacy, one writer has concluded:

"Principle, not populism, is desperately scarce today. . . . Contrast that with Soule's willingness to sacrifice himself for vulnerable humans everywhere he encountered them: he fought Slavery even before the Civil War, he upstood at Sand Creek, and he rescued white settler children held as hostages. . . . To institutionalize principle, we need to elevate a role model like Silas Soule. . . . The marker at Arapahoe and 15th . . . is an insufficient tribute to someone who should be a household name."

== Papers ==
Soule's letters to his family, as well as other original items from his life, are in the care of his collateral descendants in Iowa; transcripts of his letters and other documents, including some military records, are in the Denver Public Library. His letters to Walt Whitman are in the Library of Congress. Items relating to his time in Kansas are in the Kansas Historical Society collections.

== See also ==
- Hugh Thompson Jr., credited with intervening in, and later exposing, the 1968 My Lai massacre.
