= Fort Mann =

U.S. Army frontier fort

Coordinates: 37.7744°N 100.1640°W

Fort Mann, Kansas
- 6.92 miles (11.14 km) west of Dodge City, Kansas

Site information
- Type: U.S. Army post
- Controlled by: U.S. Army

Site history
- Built: 1847
- In use: April 1847 to June 1847, November 1847 to summer 1848
- Materials: wood, earthwork

Garrison information
- Past commanders: Capt. Daniel P. Mann, John Simpson Smith, Thomas Sloan, Lieut. Col. William Gilpin, Capt. William Pelzer
- Garrison: 10 to 270 men

Fort Mann, located on the Santa Fe Trail west of what is now Dodge City, Kansas, was a U.S. Army frontier fort, constructed from 1847.

== Construction ==
Early in 1847 Capt. William M. D. McKissack, the assistant quartermasterfor the Army in the west, proposed for a government depot to be built halfway between Santa Fe & Fort Leavenworth. In a letter to a superior McKissack wrote, "In crossing the plains there is no means of securing Wagons that become unserviceable for want of repairs; generally the bands, tires, spokes, etc. become loose on account of the dryness of the atmosphere and having no means of repairs; in such cases, the Wagons are abandoned [sic]." McKissack made arrangements for the outpost to be constructed and occupied by teamsters, but no Army troops. In April 1847 forty teamsters under Capt. Daniel P. Mann, a master teamster, began construction of the post. The post was named Fort Mann, after him. By late May construction was completed. The fort consisted of four flat-roofed buildings laid out in a rectangle with a large rectangle courtyard at the center of them. The orientation of the buildings was not in a square, but the buildings were laid out so the stockade wall on the opposite side of the gate was on the north side of the fort. The buildings, constructed of wood and adobe, were connected by four sections of wooden stockade walls at angles, giving the post an octagonal shape. At the center of one of the stockade walls was a gate one foot thick. The gate opened at its center. Loopholes were cut into the stockade walls to allow those inside to shoot outside in case of an attack. A six-pounder cannon, sometimes called a mountain howitzer, was mounted on wheels. Adobe breastworks were built on the roof of both the northwest building and the southeast building.

Before Fort Mann was completed, daily alarms were sounded to alert the teamsters about potential hostilities with area Indians, who opposed anyone from the outside occupying what they considered their land. In May two incidents, with one teamster being killed, took place. One Indian was shot, possibly fatally, and carried away by his comrades.

== Garrison ==
Considering the troubles between the teamsters and Indians, Fort Mann should have had some soldiers present. The weapons at the post for its defense were few, consisting of the one cannon with forty rounds of grapeshot and forty cannon cartridges and six rifles and muskets.

On May 17 most of the teamsters left. Only ten or a few more teamsters were present after that. The ten few men left were rotated in a guard duty of the post, leaving no time day or night with the place unguarded. Some supplies got to Fort Mann, but the post was not safe and no one ventured outside the gates without a rifle.

John Simpson Smith was appointed to command Fort Mann. After seven days, Smith left and Thomas Sloan, the post blacksmith, assumed command. Groups of hostile Indians continued to harass the fort and travelers passing through the area. Construction was not finished when Mann's group left and continued for a while with the reduced garrison. Sometimes there was peace, but on June 19 Fort Mann was attacked by 400 Indian warriors. The teamsters repelled several attacks and it was said fifteen Indians were killed and thirty to forty were wounded. During a lull in the battle three defenders left, but were killed and scalped within sight of Fort Mann.

== First abandonment ==
After the Indians withdrew and Sloan decided to abandon Fort Mann. Taking the cannon with them, the teamsters headed to Santa Fe. In early July the abandoned fort provided two men travelling the trial refuge. For two days Indians tried to overwhelm the fort, but gave up and left. A passing wagon train eventually picked up the men.

Until November the abandoned fort suffered from neglect and from passing travelers, who stripped wood from it for cooking. In September the Indian Battalion Missouri Volunteers were formed in part to once again occupy Fort Mann. They travelled from Fort Leavenworth and arrived in November. The battalion, under Lieut. Col. William Gilpin had five companies. Two were mounted, one was artillery and two were infantry. The infantry and artillery companies were left at Fort Mann to rebuild and expand the fort.

== Arrival of Pelzer, conflict with the Pawnees ==
The three companies, commanded by William Pelzer, comprised fifty-four officers and 216 enlisted men. Many enlisted men possibly lived through the winter in crude shelters or tents. These men had never been on the great plains frontier and only one company was composed of English speakers. The other two companies were composed of Germans from St. Louis who knew no or little English and who had not been well trained in Army discipline.

Leaving Pelzer in charge turned into a disaster very soon. On Nov. 19, 1847, a group of Pawnees were camped about one-fourth of a mile from the fort. The soldiers were assembled inside the fort walls. After Sixty-five or so Pawnees, under a white flag, approached the assembled troops were dismissed. Pelzer and some of the officers ventured outside the walls to meet the Indians and a peace pipe was eventually passed amongst the Pawnees and officers.

Pelzer ushered most of these Indians inside Fort Mann. Pelzer was advised by an officer who only later became aware of the passing of the peace pipe. He thought the Indians were not sincere and advised Pelzer to hold all the Indians prisoner until Gilpin could come to Fort Mann. Some of the troops failed in an attempt to disarm the Indians and Pelzer ordered his men to fire upon the Indians. Company E, the only company of fluent English speakers, was ordered by its leader, Capt. Napoleon Koscialowski, to refrain from taking part in actions against the Indians. Nine Indians were killed in this fiasco and many were wounded and taken away by their comrades. Two wounded Indians were taken prisoner and one of these was held in chains until the middle of 1848.

This episode was a disaster in two ways. First, the Pawnees, who had come in peace, now had a deep distrust of the white men. Second, morale broke down completely at Fort Mann. An animosity arose between the enlisted men and their officers. Another animosity arose between the German speakers and the English-speaking company under Koscialowski. Koscialowski and another captain from Company E wrote letters to one of the St. Louis newspapers in which they criticized Pelzer. Soon most of the enlisted men did as they pleased and the feud between the German and English speakers at times turned violent.

Gilpin, in a campaign against Indians hostile to whites in the region, became aware of some of the problems at Fort Mann. He ordered Company E to join him. After this 112 men still at Fort Mann signed a petition asking for Gilpin to remove Pelzer as their commander. The petition and letters and stories made their way into newspapers and the situation received the attention of the War Department. The War Department decided to send Col. John Garland to travel to Fort Mann to determine what should be done. Shortly before Garland arrived, Gilpin made his way to Fort Mann on May 30.

Gilpin found Indians waiting to negotiate a peace treaty with him, but he explained he had no authority to negotiate a treaty and they left. Gilpin found morale at the post almost nonexistent. Very few of the officers had acted responsibly while Pelzer was in charge. Gilpin began establishing order at the post. He arrested Pelzer and other men and began restoring discipline by the time Garland arrived to investigate affairs at the post.

== Resignation of Pelzer and final abandonment of the fort ==
Garland interviewed most of those who were at Fort Mann and Pelzer was persuaded to resign. Other officers resigned and a few privates were dishonorably discharged. Garland absolved Gilpin of most of the guilt for what happened at the fort and he continued in military service. Gilpin served as governor of Colorado Territory from 1861 to 1862.Thomas L. Karnes, Garland released the Indian who had been held in chains by Pelzer. Garland told him to instruct his chief that the guilty white man had been disgraced and punished for his actions against the Indians. Soon after this Fort Mann was abandoned and fell into ruin.

== Fort Atkinson ==
In 1850 a fort a few miles to the east was established. This was Fort Atkinson. Sometimes the two forts have been confused for the same fort and location, but these were two distinct forts that never shared a common location. Fort Mann's colorful history not only reflected poorly on the attempt to protect the Santa Fe Trail travelers, but it damaged the trust the American government hoped to build between it and Indians on that part of the frontier.
