= John Chivington =

American pastor and soldier (1821–1894)

John M. Chivington
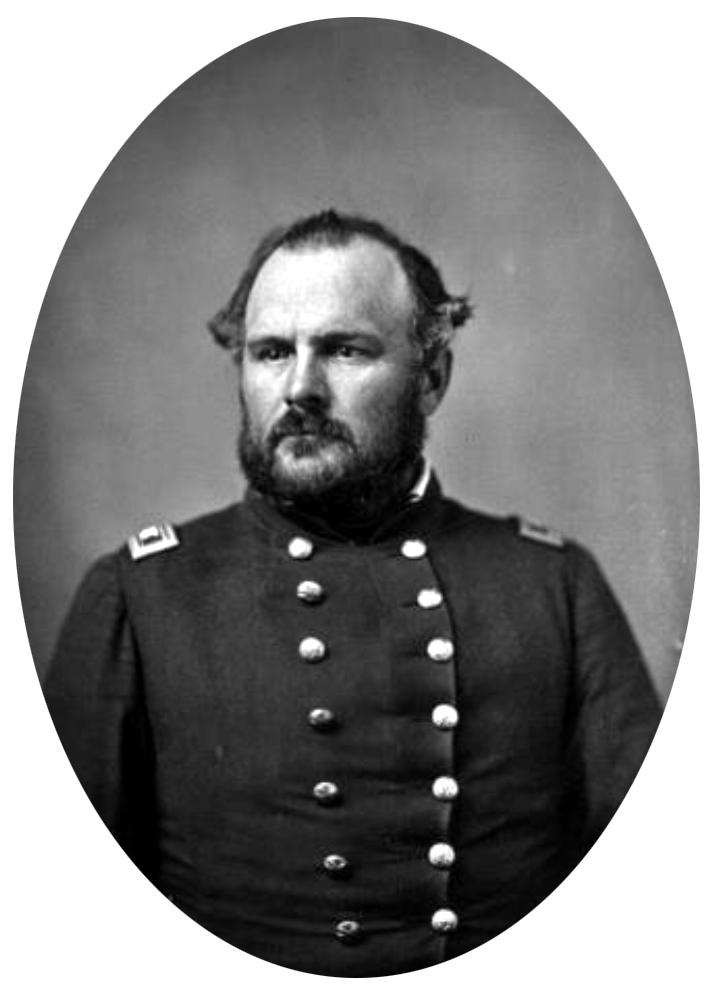
- Born: January 27, 1821; Lebanon, Ohio, U.S.
- Died: October 4, 1894 (aged 73); Denver, Colorado, U.S.
- Burial place: Fairmount Cemetery, Denver, Colorado
- Military career
- Allegiance: United States of America
- Branch: United States Army; Union Army
- Service years: 1861–1864
- Rank: Colonel
- Commands: 1st Colorado Infantry Regiment; 1st Colorado Cavalry Regiment; 3rd Colorado Cavalry Regiment
- Conflicts: American Civil War: Battle of Glorieta Pass; Indian Wars: Sand Creek massacre
- Other work: Methodist preacher

John Milton Chivington (January 27, 1821 – October 4, 1894) was a Methodist pastor and Mason who served as a colonel in the United States Volunteers during the New Mexico Campaign of the American Civil War. He led a rear action against a Confederate supply train in the Battle of Glorieta Pass that ended the Confederacy's campaigns in the Western states, and was then appointed a colonel of cavalry during the Colorado War.

Colonel Chivington gained infamy for leading the 700-man force of Colorado Territory volunteers responsible for one of the most heinous atrocities in American military history: the November 1864 Sand Creek massacre. An estimated 70 to 600 Cheyenne and Arapaho – about two-thirds of whom were women, children, and infants – were murdered and mutilated by Col. Chivington and the volunteer troops under his command. Chivington and his men also took scalps and many other human body parts as trophies, including unborn fetuses, as well as male and female genitalia. The Joint Committee on the Conduct of the War conducted an investigation of the massacre, but while they condemned Chivington and his soldiers in the strongest possible terms, no court-martial proceedings were brought against him or them. The only punishment Col. Chivington suffered was public exposure and the end of his political aspirations.

Three years prior to Sand Creek, on August 2, 1861, he became the first Grand Master of the Grand Lodge of Colorado. Several Freemasons, some of whom were present at the Sand Creek Massacre, objected to Chivington's actions and publicly denounced them, while others supported him.

== Early life ==
Chivington was born in Lebanon, Ohio on January 27, 1821, the son of Isaac and Jane Chivington, who had fought under General William Henry Harrison against members of Tecumseh's Confederacy at the Battle of the Thames.

Drawn to Methodism, Chivington became a minister. Following ordination in 1844, his first appointment was to Payson Circuit in the Illinois Conference. On the journey from Ohio to Illinois, Chivington contracted smallpox. He served the Illinois conference for ten years. In 1853, he worked in a Methodist missionary expedition to the Wyandot people in Kansas, a part of the Kansas–Nebraska Annual Conference. His outspoken views in favor of abolitionism put him in danger, and upon the advice of "Congressman Craig and other friends," Chivington was persuaded to leave the Kansas Territory for the Nebraska Territory.

As a result, the Methodist Church transferred Chivington to a parish in Omaha, Nebraska. Chivington left this position after a year. Historian James Haynes said of Chivington's pastoral abilities: "Mr. Chivington was not as steady in his demeanor as becomes a man called of God to the work of the ministry, giving his ministerial friends regret and even trouble in their efforts to sustain his reputation."

In May 1860, Chivington moved, with his family, to the Colorado Territory and settled in Denver. From there, he sought to establish missions in the South Park mining camps in Park County. He was elected Presiding Elder of the new Rocky Mountain District and served in that capacity until 1862. Controversy began to mar Chivington's appointment, who stopped performing his function as presiding elder. Chivington was not reappointed at the 1862 conference; rather, his name was recorded as "located." According to early Methodist polity, describing a minister as "located" means that the minister has effectively been retired. Historian of Methodism Isaac Beardsley, a personal friend of Chivington, suggested that Chivington was "thrown out" because of his involvement with the armed forces. Chivington's status as being "located" did not remove him completely from Methodist politics. His name appears as a member of the executive board of Colorado Seminary, the historic precursor of the University of Denver and the Iliff School of Theology. His name also appears in the incorporation document issued by the Council and House of Representatives of the Colorado Territory, which was approved by then governor John Evans.

== Battle of Glorieta Pass ==
When the Civil War broke out, Colorado Territorial Governor William Gilpin offered him a commission as a chaplain, but Chivington refused it, saying he wanted to fight. He was commissioned a major in the 1st Colorado Infantry Regiment under Colonel John P. Slough.

During Confederate General Henry Hopkins Sibley's offensive in the East Arizona and New Mexico territories, Chivington led a 418-man detachment to Apache Canyon. On March 26, 1862, they surprised about 300 Confederate Texans under Major Charles L. Pyron. The startled Texans were routed with four killed, 20 wounded and 75 captured, while Chivington's men lost five killed and 14 wounded. This small victory raised morale in Slough's army. On March 28, Slough sent Chivington and his men on a circling movement, with orders to hit Sibley in the flank once Slough's main force had engaged his front at Glorieta Pass, New Mexico. Chivington got into position above the Pass, but waited in vain for either Slough or Sibley to arrive. While they waited, scouts reported that Sibley's entire supply train was nearby at Johnson's Ranch.

Chivington's command, among whom there was a detail of Colorado Mounted Rangers, descended the slope and crept up on the supply train. They waited for an hour in concealment, then attacked, driving off or capturing the small Confederate guard detail without any casualties. Chivington ordered the supply wagons burned, and the horses and mules slaughtered. Meanwhile, the Battle of Glorieta Pass was raging at Pigeon's Ranch. Chivington returned to Slough's main force to find it rapidly falling back. The Confederates had won the battle, but because of Chivington's forces, they had no supplies to sustain their advance and were forced to retreat, rendering their victory moot. Sibley's men reluctantly retreated back to Texas and never again threatened New Mexico.

Chivington earned high praise for his decisive stroke at Johnson's Ranch, even though his discovery of the Confederate supply train was accidental. Critics have suggested that had Chivington returned quickly to reinforce Slough's army when he heard gunfire, his 400 extra men might have allowed the Union to win the battle. A captured Confederate chaplain also complained that Chivington had threatened to kill the prisoners he took at Johnson's Ranch.

== Colorado District command ==
The victory at Glorieta Pass gave Chivington a reputation as a bold and daring commander. Along with his ardent advocacy of statehood, he hoped it could help him become the first member of the U.S. House of Representatives elected from Colorado. To that end he cultivated his connections with political leaders like territorial governor John Evans. But he also knew that his chances would be best if he could secure another key military victory. The wars with various local Native American tribes, a matter that affected Coloradans more directly than the Civil War, offered an opportunity.

In April 1862, Chivington was appointed colonel of the 1st Colorado Cavalry Regiment, and commander of the military district of Colorado. In November, Chivington was appointed brigadier general of volunteers, an appointment withdrawn in February 1863. His superiors expressed enough concern that he was putting his political interests ahead of his duties that he had to write Major General Samuel Ryan Curtis, commander of the Department of Kansas, a letter of reassurance.

== Sand Creek Massacre ==
Damn any man who sympathizes with Indians! ... I have come to kill Indians, and believe it is right and honorable to use any means under God's heaven to kill Indians. ... Kill and scalp all, big and little; nits make lice.

— Col. John Milton Chivington

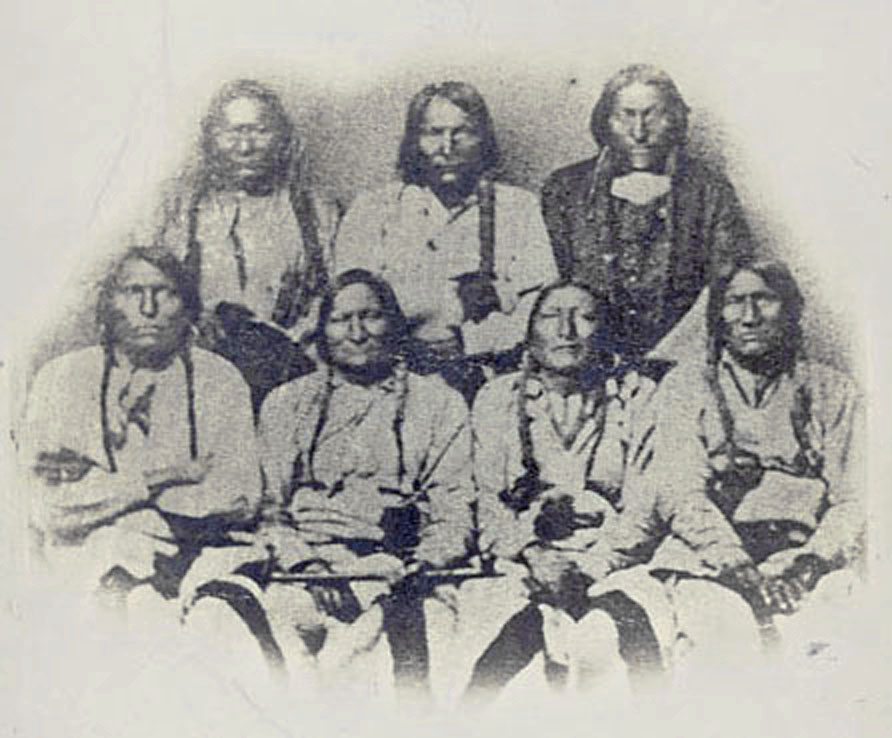
A delegation of Cheyenne, Kiowa, and Arapaho Chiefs in Denver, Colorado on September 28, 1864

Following the Hungate massacre in June 1864, tensions between settlers and Indians rose. War seemed likely, and Evans wrote to the War Department in Washington to request both more troops and the authority to raise more for a hundred days. The latter was granted, and Chivington formed the 3rd Colorado Cavalry Regiment from a group of volunteers who largely lacked combat experience, to protect Denver and the Platte road. For political reasons, Evans had stoked the fears of the populace regarding Indian attacks, and he and Chivington both hoped successful military engagements against the Indians would further their careers. But most of the Indian war parties and attacks were occurring hundreds of miles away.

In the fall of 1864, Major Edward Wynkoop received a letter from Black Kettle requesting a peace council and an exchange of prisoners, and Wynkoop succeeded in holding a conference with multiple Cheyenne and Arapaho chiefs, including Black Kettle and Left Hand, and securing the release of some prisoners who had been taken during earlier Dog Soldier raids. Wynkoop and Captain Silas Soule, after the peace conference, traveled to Denver with both the returned prisoners and some of the chiefs. Wynkoop convinced a reluctant Evans, along with Chivington, to meet with the chiefs. Known as the Camp Weld Conference, it resulted in Evans making an offer of protection to those Indians who would surrender to Wynkoop at Fort Lyon. The chiefs agreed, and, after gathering their peaceful tribes, camped about 40 mi (64 km) north of the fort, at Big Sandy Creek.

In October 1864, the 100-day enlistment of the 3rd was almost over, and Chivington's Civil War enlistment had expired, meaning he would soon lose his command position after the 3rd was disbanded. Tensions had eased even before the Camp Weld conference, meaning the battle Chivington had hoped for less likely. After learning of the agreement reached with the chiefs, Chivington complained to Curtis that Wynkoop, whom he resented for having dealt with the Indians without clearing most of those actions with him, was too conciliatory with the Indians. Curtis replaced him with Major Scott Anthony, who agreed with Chivington's goal of Indian eradication. But Anthony requested that Wynkoop stay and advise him for a short period, despite being under orders from Curtis to end the protection of the Arapaho and Cheyenne encamped near Fort Lyon, and end the promised distribution of provisions.

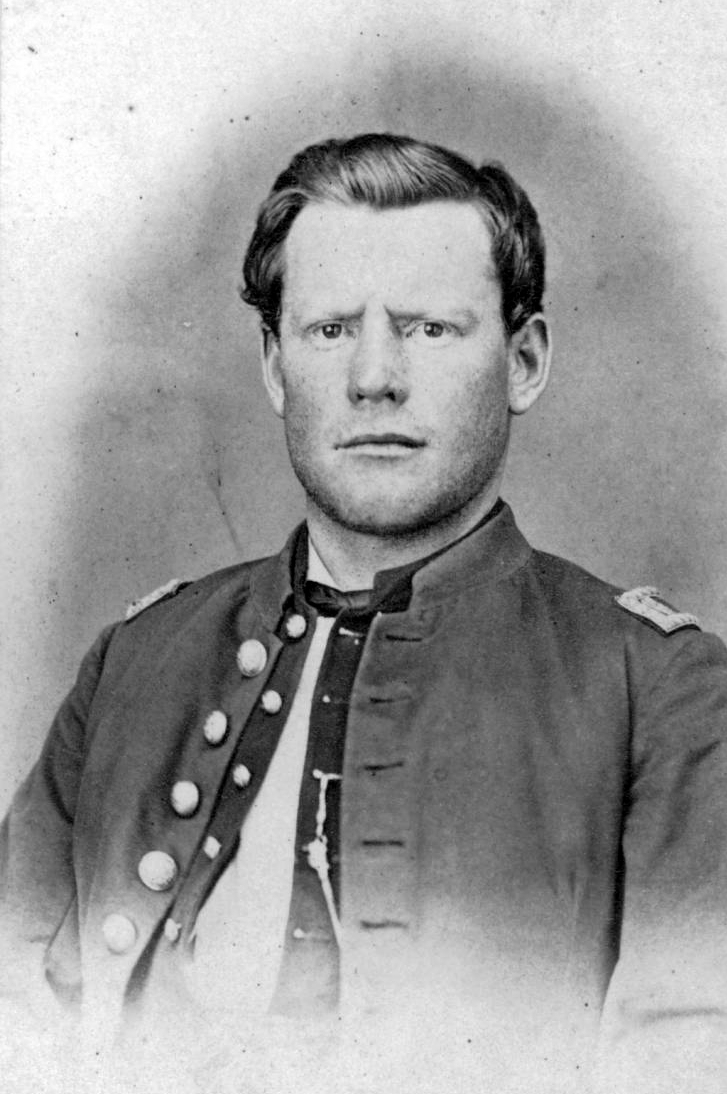
Captain Silas Soule (1838-1865), who refused to attack the Indians at Sand Creek, and later testified against Chivington shortly before being murdered, possibly in retaliation

After resettling his mostly Southern Cheyenne people, and hearing from Major Anthony that the distribution of provisions was ended, Black Kettle sent most of his warriors to hunt, leaving only 60 men in the village, most of them too old or too young to hunt. Dog soldiers and other Indian warriors were not part of the Sand Creek encampment.

In November, Chivington and his 800 troops of the 1st and 3rd Colorado cavalry regiments along with a company of 1st New Mexico Volunteer Infantry marched to Fort Lyon. On the way there, they learned from those going the other way how many Arapaho and Cheyenne were camped near the fort, that the Indians had not left and stated their peaceful intentions. Upon reaching the fort, with Wynkoop and Anthony still present, Chivington posted guards outside so no one could leave or enter and placed soldiers known to have helped the Indians under arrest.

Chivington then briefed the other troops on his plans to march on the Indians the next morning and slaughter as many of them as possible. Some junior officers demurred. "Any man that would take part in the murders, knowing the circumstances as we do", said Captain Silas Soule, "is a low-lived cowardly son of a bitch." Lt. Joe Cramer also said that with the Indians currently showing no signs of preparing for war, Chivington's plans amounted to mass murder. Chivington threatened to hang Soule for attempting to incite mutiny and told the others who had challenged his orders that they should leave the Army.

Afterwards the troops marched nearly to the reservation. On the night of November 28, after camping, Chivington's men drank heavily and celebrated the anticipated fight. The next morning Chivington ordered his troops to attack.

Soule, who had come along, refused to follow Chivington's order and told his men to hold fire. Other soldiers in Chivington's force, however, immediately attacked the village. Ignoring the U.S. flag, and a white flag they raised shortly after the soldiers began firing, Chivington's soldiers massacred the majority of the mostly unarmed Cheyenne, taking scalps and other body parts as battle trophies, including human fetuses and male and female genitalia. The attack became known as the Sand Creek Massacre.

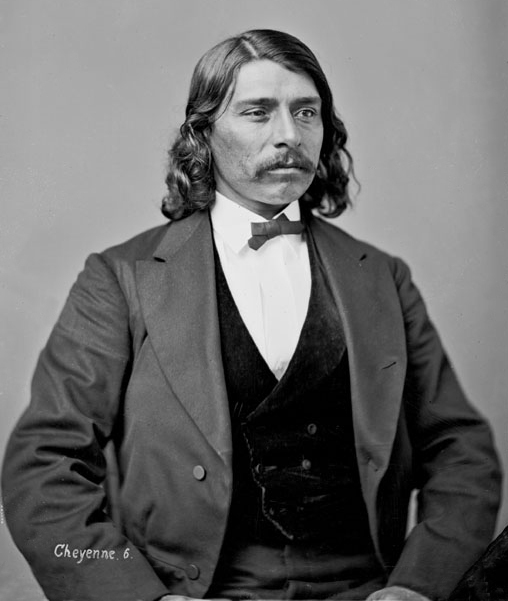
Edmund Guerrier (1840-1921) provided testimony to Congressional investigators at Fort Riley, Kansas in 1865 concerning the Sand Creek Massacre.

The Colorado forces lost 15 killed and more than 50 wounded, mostly due to friendly fire (likely caused by their heavy drinking). Between 150 and 200 Indians were estimated dead, nearly all women and children. Chivington testified before a Congressional committee that his forces had killed 500 to 600 Indians and that few of them were women or children. Others testified against him.

A prominent mixed-race Cheyenne witness named Edmund Guerrier, said that about 53 men and 110 women and children were killed.

With Chivington's declaring his forces had won a battle against hostile Cheyenne, the action was initially celebrated as a victory. On the way back from the site, he wrote an official account of a long march through snow to a battle against fierce and dedicated opposition won by troops who performed "nobly". Some soldiers displayed Indian body parts as trophies in Denver saloons. However, the testimony of Soule, Cramer and his men contradicted their commander and resulted in a U.S. Congressional investigation into the incident, which concluded that Chivington had acted wrongly.

Soule and some of the men whom he commanded testified against Chivington at his U.S. Army court martial. Chivington denounced Soule as a liar. Within three months, Soule was murdered by a soldier who had been under Chivington's command at Sand Creek. Some believed Chivington may have been involved.

Chivington was soon condemned for his part in the massacre, but he had already resigned from the Army in June or July 1865 . The general post-Civil War amnesty meant that criminal charges could not be filed against him. An Army judge publicly stated that the Sand Creek massacre was "a cowardly and cold-blooded slaughter, sufficient to cover its perpetrators with indelible infamy, and the face of every American with shame and indignation". Public outrage at the brutality of the massacre, particularly considering the mutilation of corpses, was intense. Even those who favored harsher action towards the Indians condemned Chivington as they knew it had cost them any trust the Indians might have had in them. It was believed to have contributed to public pressure to change Indian policy. The Congress later rejected the idea of a general war against the Indians of the Middle West.

The panel of the Joint Committee on the Conduct of the War declared:

As to Colonel Chivington, your committee can hardly find fitting terms to describe his conduct. Wearing the uniform of the United States, which should be the emblem of justice and humanity; holding the important position of commander of a military district, and therefore having the honor of the government to that extent in his keeping, he deliberately planned and executed a foul and dastardly massacre which would have disgraced the verist [sic] savage among those who were the victims of his cruelty. Having full knowledge of their friendly character, having himself been instrumental to some extent in placing them in their position of fancied security, he took advantage of their in-apprehension and defenceless [sic] condition to gratify the worst passions that ever cursed the heart of man. Whatever influence this may have had upon Colonel Chivington, the truth is that he surprised and murdered, in cold blood, the unsuspecting men, women, and children on Sand creek, who had every reason to believe they were under the protection of the United States authorities.

== Later life and death ==
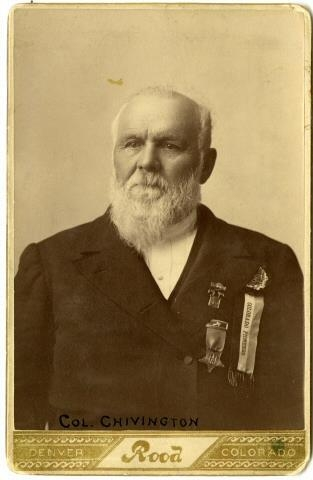
Chivington in his later years, by Edgar H. Rood

Chivington resigned from the army in February 1865. In 1865 his son, Thomas, drowned and Chivington returned to Nebraska to administer the estate. There he became an unsuccessful freight hauler. He seduced and then married his daughter-in-law, Sarah. In October 1871, she obtained a decree of divorce for non-support.

Public outrage forced Chivington to withdraw from politics and kept him out of Colorado's campaign for statehood. The editor of the Omaha Daily Herald tagged Chivington a "rotten, clerical hypocrite."

In July 1868, Chivington went to Washington, D.C. in an unsuccessful pursuit of a $37,000 (~$745,000 in 2025) claim for Indian depredations. He returned to Omaha, but journeyed to Troy, New York, during 1869 to stay with Sarah's relatives. He borrowed money from them but did not repay. Sarah recalled that they returned to Washington in the spring of 1870 and Chivington "spent his time trying to get money without labor. ...

The early spring of 1871 he skipped as I heard afterward to Canada ... Left me without means of support. I had no desire to live with a criminal.

After living briefly in California, Chivington returned to Ohio to farm. Later he became editor of a local newspaper. In 1883, he campaigned for a seat in the Ohio legislature, but withdrew when his opponents drew attention to the Sand Creek Massacre.

He returned to Denver where he worked as a deputy sheriff until shortly before his death from cancer in 1894. His funeral took place at the city's Trinity United Methodist Church before his remains were interred at Fairmount Cemetery.

To the end of his life, Chivington maintained that Sand Creek had been a successful operation. He argued that his expedition was a response to Cheyenne and Arapaho raids and torture inflicted on wagon trains and white settlements in Colorado.

Chivington violated official agreements for protection of Black Kettle's friendly band. He also overlooked how the massacre caused the Cheyenne, Arapaho, and Sioux to strengthen their alliance and to accelerate their raids on white settlers. Until he died, Chivington still claimed to have been justified in ordering the attack, consistently stating, "I stand by Sand Creek."

== Legacy ==
In 1887, the unincorporated settlement of Chivington, Colorado, was established and named after John Chivington. The railroad town on the Missouri Pacific Railroad line was fairly close to the site of the massacre. In the 1920s and 1930s, it was largely depopulated by the Dust Bowl, but some buildings still remain.

Because of Chivington's position as a lay preacher, in 1996 the General conference of the United Methodist Church expressed regret for the Sand Creek massacre. It issued an apology to the Southern Cheyenne for the "actions of a prominent Methodist".

In 2005, the City Council of Longmont, Colorado, agreed to change the name of Chivington Drive in the town following a two-decade campaign. Protesters had objected to Chivington being honored for the Sand Creek Massacre. The street was renamed Sunrise Drive.

== In popular culture ==
- In George Sherman's 1951 Western Tomahawk, set several years after the Sand Creek massacre, Army Lt. Rob Dancy brags to Julie Madden, whose wagon his patrol is escorting, about having ridden with Chivington years before. The movie's main character, frontiersman Jim Bridger, later tells Julie that his wife had been chief Black Kettle's daughter and that the teenage Cheyenne girl accompanying him, Monahseetah, is her sister and the only survivor of a massacre perpetrated by Chivington and his men. Bridger also erroneously tells Julie that Chivington is dead (the film is set in 1866, and Chivington lived until 1894). Bridger suspects Dancy to be his wife's murderer and pursues him after Dancy escapes from a battle with the Sioux he had provoked against orders. When confronted, Dancy confirms Bridger's suspicion by claiming to have acted on orders. While Bridger is still beating him up, Dancy is shot by a young Sioux whose friend Dancy had killed (thus initiating the conflict) early in the story.
- The American television series Playhouse 90 broadcast "Massacre at Sand Creek" on December 27, 1956. It recounted the massacre and the court-martial of Chivington, but changed the names of those involved. Chivington became John Templeton, played by Everett Sloane.
- Ainslie Pryor had an uncredited role as Chivington in the 1957 film, The Guns of Fort Petticoat, with Audie Murphy as Lt. Frank Hewitt, Hope Emerson as Hannah Lacey, Jeanette Nolan as Cora Melavan, and Sean McClory as Emmett Kettle.
- The episode "Handful of Fire" (December 5, 1961) of NBC's Laramie western series is loosely based on historical events. A Colonel John Barrington, played by George Macready, and presumably modeled on John Chivington, escapes while facing a court martial at Fort Laramie for his role in the Wounded Knee Massacre in South Dakota in 1890. The Laramie episode reveals that series character Slim Sherman (John Smith) had been present at Wounded Knee and hence testified against Barrington. Then Barrington's daughter, Madge, played by Karen Sharpe, takes Slim hostage. She has papers which she contends justify her father's harsh policies against the Indians. Slim escapes but is trapped by the Sioux and must negotiate with the Indians to save the party from massacre.
- Lewis B. Patten wrote several historical novels about the Cheyenne. In the first story in "Gun The Man Down, a Western Duo", The White Cheyenne is the story of Julien Tremeau, son of mountain man and rancher Charles Tremeau and his Indian wife Red Earth Woman. Charles Tremeau thought his son should know the white world as well as the Indian, and so sent Julien East to school, only for Julien to return to the West, marry Bird Woman, and live with the Cheyenne in Chief Black Kettle's village. The morning Colonel Chivington and his volunteer army encircled the village and began the slaughter that would result in more than two hundred dead, Bird Woman was killed, their two children taken prisoner to be put on exhibit in a tent show in Denver, and Julien left for dead. But he was not dead and he vowed vengeance on all whites, including the man who had stolen his children.
