= 1st Colorado Cavalry Regiment =

Former American military unit

- Flag of the United States, 1861-1863
- Active: November 1862 to November 1865
- Country: United States
- Allegiance: Union
- Branch: Cavalry

The 1st Colorado Cavalry Regiment was formed in November 1862 by Territorial Governor John Evans, composed mostly of members of the 1st Colorado Infantry Regiment and of C and D Companies of the 2nd Colorado Infantry Regiment. It was formed both to protect Colorado against incursions from the Confederate forces and to fight the Native Americans who already inhabited the area.

Command of this unit was given to Colonel John Chivington, who had distinguished himself at the Battle of Glorieta Pass in the New Mexico Territory early in 1862 against Confederate forces.

== Sand Creek Massacre ==
In early 1864, the 1st Colorado Veteran Volunteers (aka the Veterans Battalion) appears to have initiated the Colorado War by attacking Cheyenne Indians at Fremont's Orchard. The resulting hostilities and Indian retaliations brought traffic on the wagon trails into Denver to a standstill.

Peace negotiations were in progress, and encampments of Cheyenne and Arapaho Indians on Sand Creek had been assured by the US government that they would not be attacked.

Instead, in what is known as the Sand Creek massacre, Chivington and his troops struck in November 1864, a dawn attack that massacred an estimated one-quarter of the Indian encampments, mostly old men, women, and children. Body parts were taken as souvenirs. The event was the basis of the slaughter of an Indian village in the movies Soldier Blue and Little Big Man. Initial reports of the battle were taken as a victory among the American public, but as details came out, opinions changed. A subsequent Congressional investigation resulted in a scorching castigation of the event, Colonel John Chivington, and the 1st Colorado Cavalry Regiment.

== Statue controversy ==
In the night between June 24 and 25, 2020, a group of Black Lives Matter protestors tore down a statue depicting a Civil-War-era Colorado cavalryman located in front of the Colorado State Capitol. The statue was designed by Captain Jack Howland, a member of the 1st Colorado Cavalry regiment, and had been erected in July 1909. The base of the statue listed the Sand Creek massacre among the battles commemorated by the memorial.

== Flags ==
The regiment was given a flag while in Denver. During the Battle of Glorieta Pass the flag was ripped up by Confederate batteries. Later that year while in New Mexico the unit was presented with a new flag.

Company A carried their own flag that was made by the a group of women from Denver. After the war the flag was lost and wasn't until 1899 when the state's Adjutant General found it while cleaning out his vault. It was then sent to a local Historical society in Denver.

== See also ==
- Silas Soule, a captain in the Regiment who refused to participate in the Sand Creek Massacre
- List of Colorado Territory Civil War units
- Sand Creek Massacre
