= Sunrise Drive =

Street in Longmont, Colorado

Coordinates: 40°12′03″N 105°06′46″W

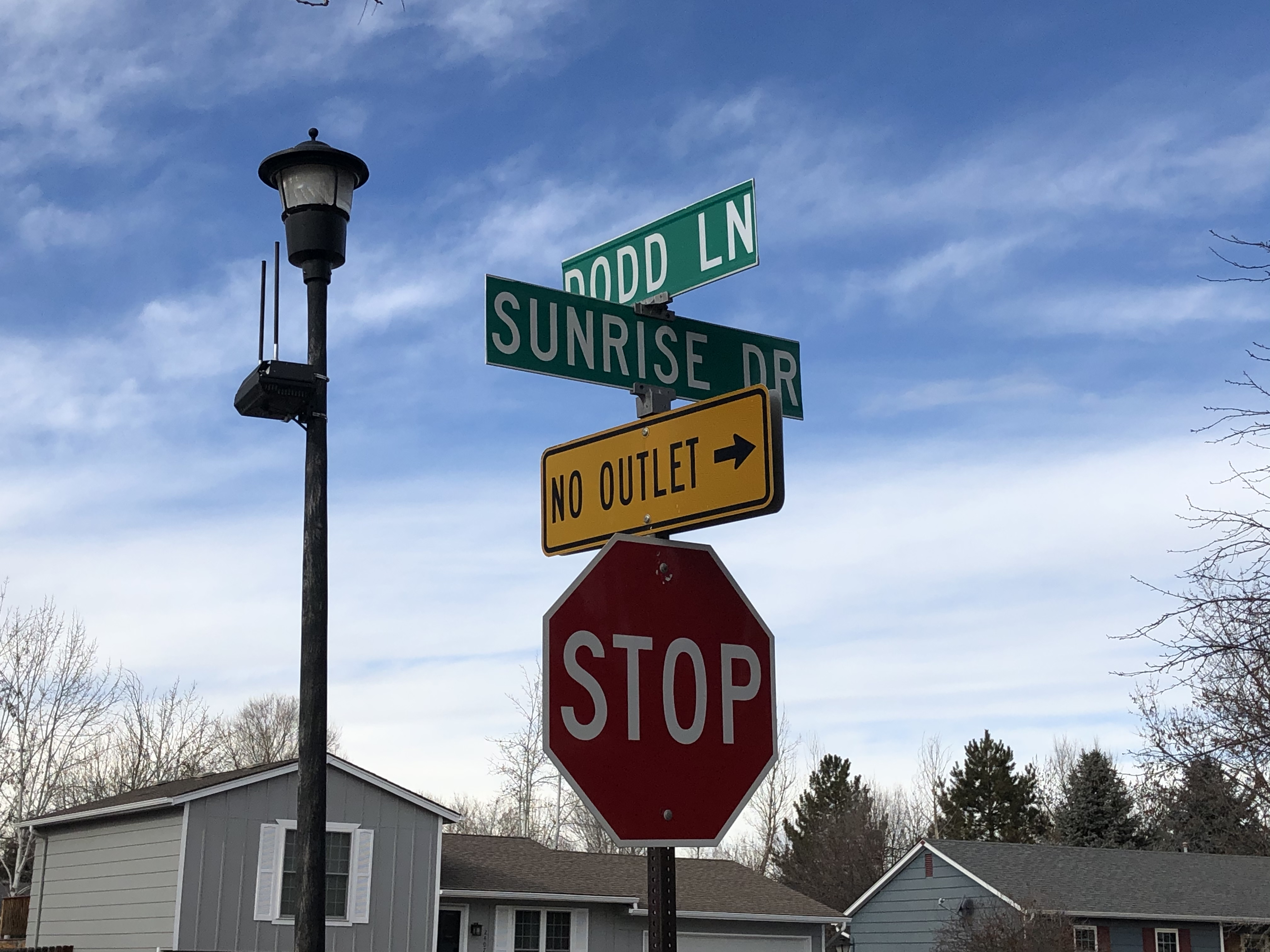
Intersection of Dodd Lane and Sunrise Drive in Longmont, Colorado

Chivington Drive was a street in Longmont, Colorado, United States which was named in 1977 after Colonel John Chivington, the person responsible for the Sand Creek Massacre of 1864. However, the name sparked controversy with proposals to change its title reaching the Longmont City Council three times over a period of more than two decades. Eventually a group called the "Longmont Citizens for Justice and Democracy" took up the campaign for the removal of Chivington's name. On December 28, 2004 the Longmont City Council voted to replace the name of the street. After almost 30 years of controversy, the street was officially renamed Sunrise Drive on March 28, 2005.
