= Black Kettle =

Leader of the Southern Cheyenne

- Mo'ȯhtávetoo'o
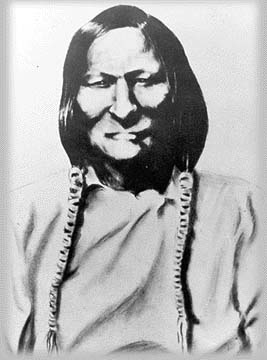
- Born: Mo'ohtavetoo'o c. 1803; Black Hills, French Louisiana
- Died: November 27, 1868 (aged 64–65); Washita River, near present-day Cheyenne, Oklahoma
- Cause of death: Gunshot wound
- Citizenship: Southern Cheyenne
- Known for: Colorado War; Sand Creek massacre Treaty of Medicine Lodge; Battle of Washita River †
- Title: Tribal chief

Black Kettle (Cheyenne: Mo'ȯhtávetoo'o; c. 1803 – November 27, 1868) was a leader of the Southern Cheyenne during the American Indian Wars. Born to the Northern Só'taeo'o / Só'taétaneo'o band of the Northern Cheyenne in the Black Hills of present-day South Dakota, he later married into the Wotápio / Wutapai band (one mixed Cheyenne-Kiowa band with Lakota Sioux origin) of the Southern Cheyenne.

Black Kettle is often remembered as a peacemaker who accepted treaties with the U.S. government to protect his people. On November 27, 1868, while attempting to escape the Battle of Washita River with his wife, he was shot and killed by soldiers of the U.S. 7th Cavalry.

== Early life ==
Black Kettle was born around 1803 in South Dakota into the Cheyenne Nation. Little is known of Black Kettle's life prior to 1854, when he was made a chief of the Council of Forty-four, the central government of the Cheyenne tribe. The Council met regularly at the Sun Dance gatherings, where they affirmed unity.

After 1851, relations between the Cheyenne and the U.S. government were nominally conducted under the Treaty of Fort Laramie. Still, the U.S. government remained unwilling to control white expansion into the Great Plains, particularly after the Pike's Peak Gold Rush began in 1859. European Americans displaced the Cheyenne from their lands in violation of the treaty, and consumed important resources of water and game. Increasing competition eventually led to armed conflict between the groups.

Chief Black Kettle was a pragmatist who believed that U.S. military power and the number of immigrants were overwhelming and unable to be resisted. In 1861, he and the Arapaho surrendered to the commander of Fort Lyon under the Treaty of Fort Wise, believing he could gain protection for his people. The treaty was highly unfavorable to the Southern Cheyenne. Black Kettle visited Washington, D.C., where President Abraham Lincoln gave him a large American flag.

The Cheyenne led their bands to the Sand Creek reservation, which occupied a small corner of southeastern Colorado Territory about 40 miles from Fort Lyon. The land was not arable and was located far away from buffalo, their major source of meat. Many Cheyenne warriors, including the Dog Soldiers, did not accept the treaty and began to attack white settlers. Whether Black Kettle opposed these actions, tolerated them, or encouraged them remains controversial among historians.

== Colorado War ==
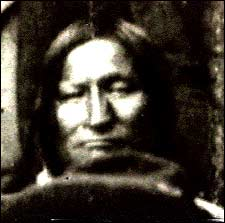
Black Kettle

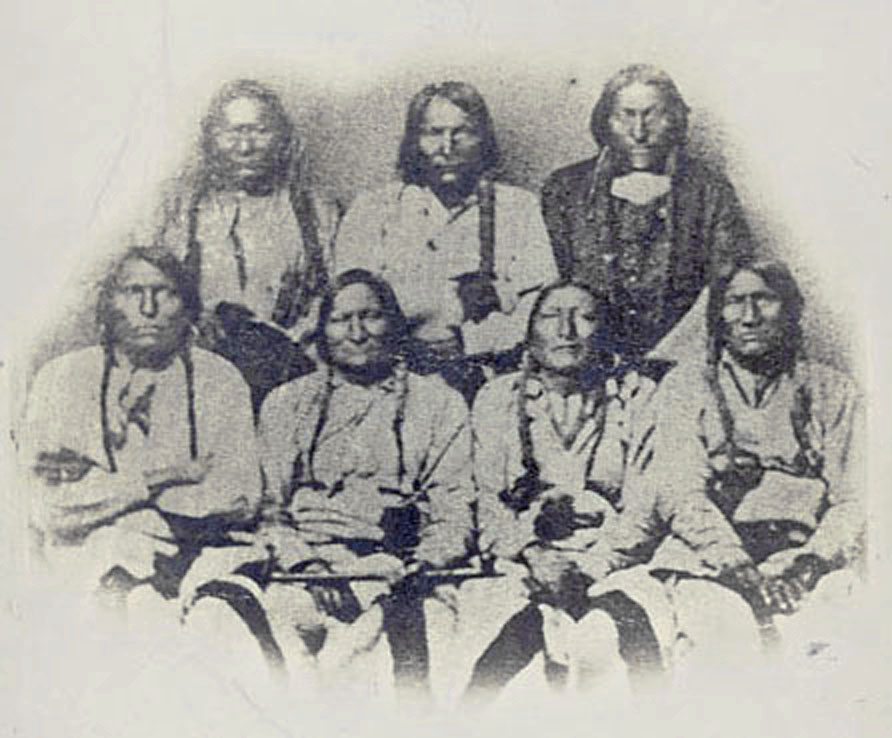
A delegation of Cheyenne, Kiowa, and Arapaho chiefs in Denver, Colorado on September 28, 1864. Black Kettle is in the front row, second from left.

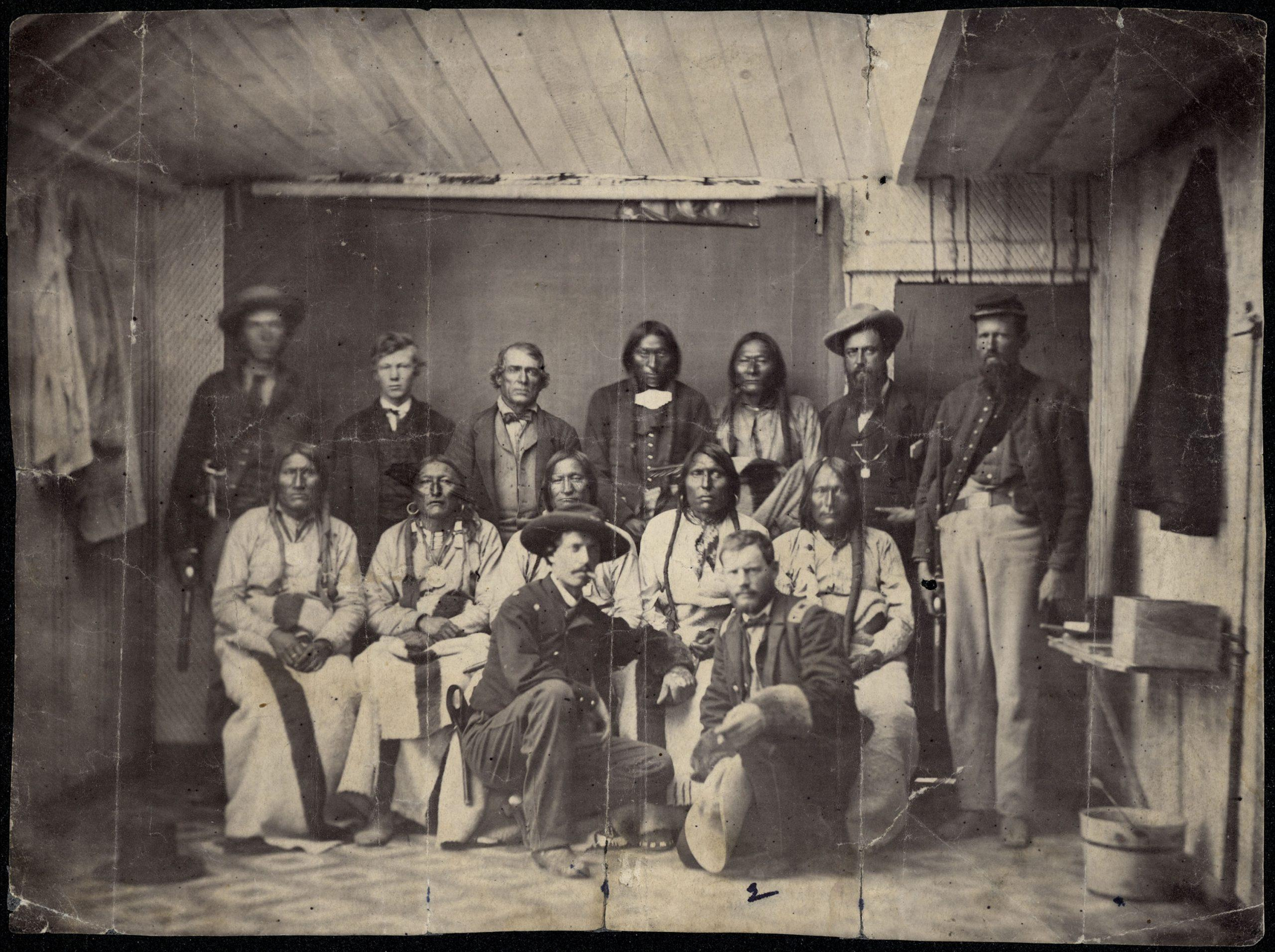
This rare photograph by an unknown photographer shows the ill-fated Cheyenne chief, Black Kettle, and a number of his associates at Camp Weld, on the outskirts of Denver. They had assembled there September 28, 1864.

By the summer of 1864, the situation had reached a boiling point. Southern Cheyenne hardliners, along with allied Kiowa and Arapaho bands, raided American settlements for livestock and supplies. Sometimes they took captives, generally only women and children, to adopt into their tribes as replacements for lost members. On June 11, 1864, indigenous people killed a family of settlers, an attack which the white people called the Hungate massacre after the family. Pro-war white people displayed the scalped bodies in Denver. Colorado governor John Evans believed tribal chiefs had ordered the attack and were intent on a full-scale war.

Evans issued a proclamation ordering all "Friendly Indians of the Plains" to report to military posts or be considered "hostile". He sought and gained from the War Department authorization to establish the Third Colorado Cavalry. Colonel John M. Chivington led the unit, composed predominantly of "100-daysers", who enlisted for limited 100-day terms specifically for fighting against the Cheyenne and Arapaho.

Black Kettle decided to accept Evans' offer and entered negotiations. On September 28, he concluded a peace settlement at Fort Weld outside Denver. The agreement assigned the Southern Cheyenne to the Sand Creek reservation and required them to report to Fort Lyon, formerly Fort Wise. Black Kettle believed the agreement would ensure the safety of his people. After he went to the reservation, the commanding officer at the fort was replaced by one who was an ally of Chivington.

=== Betrayal at Sand Creek ===
Ambitious, Chivington felt pressure from Governor Evans to make use of the Third Colorado Cavalry before their terms expired at the end of 1864. On November 28, Chivington arrived with 700 men at Fort Lyon. According to an eyewitness, John S. Smith:

[H]e stopped all persons from going on ahead of him. He stopped the mail, and would not allow any person to go on ahead of him at the time he was on his way from Denver city to Fort Lyon. He placed a guard around old Colonel Bent, the former agent there; he stopped a Mr. Hagues and many men who were on their way to Fort Lyon. He took the fort by surprise, and as soon as he got there he posted pickets all around the fort, and then left at 8 o'clock that night for this Indian camp.

At dawn on November 29, Chivington attacked the Sand Creek reservation; the event became known as the Sand Creek massacre. Most of the warriors were out hunting. Following Indian agent instructions, Black Kettle flew an American flag and a white flag from his tipi, but the signal was ignored. The 3rd Colorado Cavalry killed 163 Cheyenne by shooting or stabbing. They burned down the village encampment. Most of the victims were women and children. For months afterward, members of the militia displayed trophies in Denver of their battle, including body parts they had taken for souvenirs.

=== Aftermath ===
Black Kettle escaped the massacre and returned to rescue his severely injured wife, who suffered nine bullet and shrapnel wounds. He continued to counsel pacifism, believing that military resistance was doomed to fail. The majority of the Southern Cheyenne chiefs disagreed. Allied with the Comanche and Kiowa, they went to war against U.S. civilians and military forces.

Black Kettle said of that time:

Although wrongs have been done me, I live in hopes. I have not got two hearts.... I once thought that I was the only man that persevered to be the friend of the white man, but since they have come and cleaned out our lodges, horses, and everything else, it is hard for me to believe white men any more.

Black Kettle moved south and continued to negotiate with U.S. officials. He signed the Treaty of Little Arkansas River on October 14, 1865. By this document, the U.S. promised "perpetual peace" and lands in reparation for the Sand Creek massacre. However, its practical effect was to dispossess the Cheyenne yet again and require them to move to Indian Territory (present-day Oklahoma). Black Kettle's influence continued to wane. Roman Nose and his Dog Soldiers took a prevailing hard line and continued warfare.

== Medicine Lodge Treaty ==
Black Kettle's dwindling band proclaimed their desire to live peacefully alongside European Americans. Black Kettle signed yet another treaty, the Medicine Lodge Treaty, on October 28, 1867. The Dog Soldiers continued their raids and ambushes across Kansas, Texas, and Colorado.

The relationship between the two groups is a subject of historical dispute. According to Little Rock, second-in-command of Black Kettle's village, most of the warriors came back to Black Kettle's camp after their attacks. White prisoners, including children, were held within his encampment. By this time Black Kettle's influence was waning, and it is unclear whether he could have stopped the younger warriors' actions.

== Battle of Washita River ==
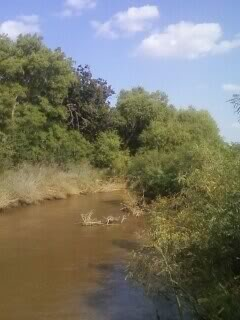
The approximate location on the Washita River where Chief Black Kettle was killed

In response to the continued raids and massacres, General Philip Sheridan devised a plan of punitive reprisals. He planned to attack Cheyenne winter encampments, destroying both supplies and livestock, and killing any people who resisted. At dawn on the morning of November 27, 1868, Lieutenant Colonel George Armstrong Custer led his 7th Cavalry Regiment to attack Chief Black Kettle and his village along the Washita River in what is now western Oklahoma. Custer's troops killed more than 100 Native Americans, mostly Southern Cheyenne.

== Death and legacy ==
While trying to cross the Washita River, Black Kettle and his wife were shot in the back and killed.

The Cheyenne have recognized Black Kettle as a peacemaker. Black Kettle National Grassland in Roger Mills County, Oklahoma and Hemphill County, Texas is named after him. Near the site of his death, in present-day Cheyenne, Oklahoma, the Black Kettle Museum commemorates his legacy.

== In popular culture ==
Black Kettle was a recurring character in the CBS family drama Dr. Quinn, Medicine Woman for its first three seasons, played by Nick Ramus. Black Kettle plays a key role for the series in the pilot episode. Dr. Quinn saves Black Kettle's life by performing a tracheotomy and removing a bullet lodged in his neck. She later receives a Cheyenne name from Black Kettle meaning "Medicine Woman".

Black Kettle and the fate of his village are featured in Episode 4 of TNT miniseries Into the West. Black Kettle is portrayed by Wes Studi.

On ska band Five Iron Frenzy's Our Newest Album Ever!, the song "Banner Year" is about Black Kettle, how he was betrayed, and his eventual murder at the hands of Custer.

Deathcab for Cutie's 2022 album Asphalt Meadows references Black Kettle during the Sand Creek Massacre in the song/spoken word piece "Foxglove Through The Clearcut."

In the 2021 documentary miniseries Exterminate All The Brutes, directed by Raoul Peck, Black Kettle and his wife Ar-no-ho-wok are both portrayed as walking alone to the regiment, harboring a white flag as a sign of peace, before getting shot without warning.
