= Hungate massacre =

Massacre in Colorado history

Coordinates: 39.5634°N 104.5264°W

The Hungate massacre involved the murder of the family of Nathan Hungate along Running Creek (Box Elder Creek near present-day Elizabeth, Colorado) on June 11, 1864. It was a precipitating factor leading to the Sand Creek massacre of November 29, 1864.

== Background ==
The Hungate family moved to the area, about 25 mi (40 km) southeast of Denver, around March 1864. The Hungates included Nathan, his wife Ellen, and daughters, Laura and Florence. They lived on the ranch of Issac Van Wormer, who employed Nathan as the ranch manager. The ranch was located just south of the County Line Road between Araphaoe-Elbert counties, east of Running Creek, and north of the town of Elizabeth.

Prior to that, in 1861, the Treaty of Fort Wise was made with American Indian tribes in Colorado Territory to restrict their access to their hunting grounds, relocate to a reservation, and grow crops in exchange for provisions. There were periods of crop failures, however, and the government did not honor its agreement to provide provisions. Tribes began stealing food and livestock. In April 1864, John Evans, the territorial governor, called for Colonel John Chivington, commander of the 1st Regiment of Colorado Volunteers to "kill Cheyenne wherever or whenever found," without determining whether or not they were guilty. The cavalry killed innocent women, children, and men, which resulted in retaliatory raids against settlers in Colorado and Kansas.

== Attack ==
On June 11, Nathan rode out with a hired hand, Mr. Miller, looking for stray heads of cattle. (Note: Michno states that he went to look for stray cattle after members of the herd had been taken by Indians.) Several miles from the ranch, they saw smoke coming from the area of Hungate's cabin and suspected an attack by American Indians. Miller said that he was riding for Denver and advised Hungate that his family was likely dead and if he went back to the cabin he would be killed, too. Hungate rode back to find that his cabin was on fire and his family had been killed and badly mutilated. He was captured and was similarly killed. The couple were in their twenties, Laura was 2 1/2 years of age, and Florence was a 6 month-old infant.

Miller made it to Denver and gave news of the attack to Van Wormer, who rode to the ranch to find the Hungate family dead. Nathan Hungate's body was badly mutilated with 80 bullets, and was found a distance from the house. The bodies of Ellen and the two girls were found mutilated, bound together, and thrown into a shallow well. All of the family's stock had been taken and the buildings were burned down.

The above story is the most common repeated account of the events, however archeological evidence and primary source research brings the story into serious question. Documents indicate that several messengers reported on the massacre after finding the scene. More importantly, weapons and items remained in the burnt home. If the fire occurred after the murders, these items would have first been stolen. The most logical conclusion is that the entire family was in the building at the time it was set on fire by a large party of Arapahoe warriors. This was most probably in retaliation for Mr. Hungate shooting and killing a member of the livestock raiding parties documented in the area at the time.

== Aftermath ==
This sad occurrence, together with the publicity which was given it, greatly aroused the temper of the people and aided materially in bringing on the Indian wars of 1864 to 1866 and the much-discussed Sand Creek battle.

— Elmer R. Burkey, The Colorado Magazine

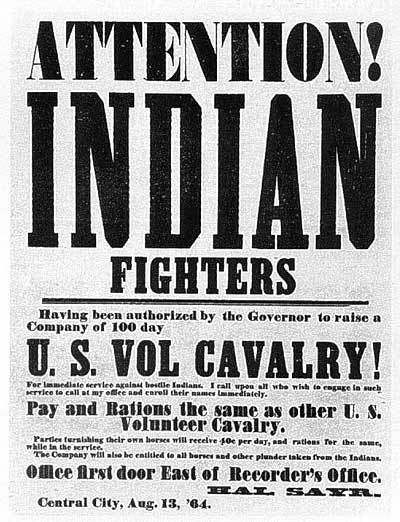
Recruiting poster for Chivington’s 100-day men

On June 13, the Hungate family's bodies were taken by Van Wormer to Denver and put on public display, creating anger and inciting revenge for the attacks presumed to be by American Indians. An inquest was held on June 14, which resulted in a decision that they were killed by unknown people, likely American Indians. It was speculated that they may have been members of the Arapaho or Cheyenne tribes. Jim Beckwourth, an experienced frontiersman, postulated that the manner of death was not consistent with either the Cheyenne or Arapaho, according to an article in Daily Commonwealth dated June 15. Others later believed that the attack was made by members of the Arapaho tribe.

Residents of Denver were frightened and wanted revenge. Citizens took it upon themselves to attack American Indians, which resulted in retaliatory reactions predominately from Cheyenne and Arapaho people. A 100-day volunteer cavalry was authorized by the U.S. War Department on August 11 and Colonel John Chivington was put in command. On November 29, Chivington led an attack on a Cheyenne and Arapaho encampment called the Sand Creek massacre.

Van Wormer gave up the ranch, and after it reverted to the government, it was purchased by Frank Girardot. After four burials, the family was finally buried at Fairmont Cemetery in Denver in June 1892. In 1939, the Pioneer Women of Colorado erected a monument in Elbert County to the Hungates and the Dietemann family, who was shot and scalped in 1868. The monument is located in front of the Elbert County Courthouse in Kiowa, Colorado.
