= William Gilpin (politician) =

American politician (1813–1894)

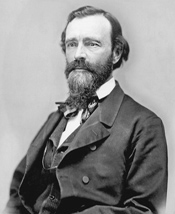

1st Governor of the Territory of Colorado
- In office March 25, 1861 – March 26, 1862
- Preceded by: Robert Williamson Steele (Territory of Jefferson)
- Succeeded by: John Evans

Personal details
- Born: October 4, 1813 Philadelphia, Pennsylvania
- Died: January 20, 1894 (aged 80) Denver, Colorado
- Party: Republican

Military service
- Branch/service: US Army
- Years of service: 1836–1838; 1846–1848
- Rank: Lieutenant Colonel
- Battles/wars: Second Seminole War; Mexican–American War

William Gilpin (October 4, 1813 – January 20, 1894) was an American explorer, politician, land speculator, and futurist writer about the American West. He served as military officer in the United States Army during several wars, accompanied John C. Frémont on his second expedition through the West, and was instrumental in the formation of the government of the Oregon Territory. As a politician and writer, he was an inveterate believer in Manifest Destiny and was a visionary booster of new settlement to the West, helping lay the groundwork in his writings for a modern theory of the succession of civilizations.

Gilpin served as the first governor of the Colorado Territory. His administration was consumed largely with the defense of the new territory in the early days of the American Civil War and was brought down after only one year by scandalous financial dealings. After the demise of his political career, he made a large fortune as a land speculator in New Mexico, although his dealings were questionable and possibly illegal.

== Early life ==
William Gilpin was born on October 4, 1813, the son of Joshua Gilpin and Mary (Dilworth) Gilpin. They were a Quaker family who resided in Brandywine, Pennsylvania. After a primary education in England, he attended the University of Pennsylvania, from which he graduated in 1833. He attended West Point from 1834 to 1835, but did not graduate.

He received a commission as second lieutenant with the 2nd Dragoon Regiment in June 1836 and served in the Seminole Wars. He also served as a recruiter in Missouri. While in Missouri, he became attracted to opportunities on the frontier and to the idea of westward expansion of the nation. After resigning in April 1838, he moved to St. Louis where he became a newspaper editor and opened a law practice. After three years in St. Louis, he moved across the state to Independence, where he interacted with emigrants about to embark on the Oregon Trail.

== Pacific Northwest ==
In 1843, he encountered John C. Frémont at Elm Grove, Missouri, and embarked westward with Frémont on his expedition to complete a survey and map of the Oregon Trail. While passing through the region of present-day Colorado, he encountered evidence of placer gold in the region, but the information would go unused for at least another decade. When the party reached the Dalles in the Oregon Country, Gilpin continued on his own to the Willamette Valley, while Frémont proceeded southward, and on to California. At the time, the Oregon Country was under joint administration by the United States and the United Kingdom, but in practical terms it was controlled by the Hudson's Bay Company at Fort Vancouver.

Gilpin settled among the growing community of U.S. settlers in the Willamette Valley and became active in the organization of a provisional government. At the landmark convention at Champoeg, he helped draft a petition requesting support for the provisional government from the United States Congress. Gilpin himself was charged with carrying the Willamette petition back east. On his way back through Missouri, he helped publicize the Pacific Northwest and stir up "Oregon fever". He delivered the petition to Congress in 1845, then wrote memoirs of his travels in the Pacific Northwest to emphasize its potential for trade and settlement.

== The Central Gold Region ==
In 1846, during the Mexican–American War, he was commissioned as Major of the 1st Missouri Mounted Infantry Regiment and marched to Chihuahua City in the successful bloodless campaign to capture New Mexico. He was considered to have served with distinction in the campaign and was later given command of a mounted infantry battalion to protect the Santa Fe Trail against attacks by Native Americans. Gilpin was also involved with the ill-fated Fort Mann, just west of what is now Dodge City, Kansas. The man Gilpin put in charge of the post created havoc and Gilpin attempted to rectify some of the problems caused there.

After the end of the war in 1848, he returned to Missouri and resumed his law practice. He made an unsuccessful attempt at a political career while in Missouri as well. In 1859, Gilpin's early intuition about gold in Colorado proved correct, and the region suddenly became the target for thousands of eager and hopeful prospectors in the ensuing Colorado Gold Rush.

That year, Gilpin published a futurist history of the region, called The Central Gold Region, in which he wrote, "the destiny of the American people is to subdue the continent". In the book he predicted that the Mississippi River valley would become the center of western civilization with the new settlement of Denver as its capital, based partly on its location near the 40th parallel north. In the book, Gilpin envisioned that all the great cities of the world along that latitude would eventually be linked by railroad lines and proposed a rail line over the Bering Strait connecting North America and Asia.

Throughout his career in politics, Gilpin was a strong believer that the American West would not only be settled but also eventually hold an enormous population. He was a particularly strong advocate of the now-debunked climatological theory of "Rain follows the plow". This theory held that settlement in the arid lands of the West would actually increase rainfall in the region, making it as fertile and green as the Eastern United States.

== Governor of Colorado ==
In the early 1860s the crisis in Kansas prompted Gilpin to join the Republican Party, putting him at odds with many citizens of Missouri. His political alignment with the new administration of U.S. President Abraham Lincoln was rewarded in 1861 when Lincoln appointed him governor of the newly formed Territory of Colorado. His selection over the local favorite William Larimer came as a surprise to many, and was motivated in part by the fact that Gilpin was backed by the Governor of Missouri, a slave state that Lincoln was eager to keep in the Union.

The US Government's Official Register for 1861 lists Gilpin as both Governor of Colorado (at a salary of $1,500 a year) and as governor and ex officio superintendent of the Indian Office's Colorado Superintendency ($2,500 a year).

=== American Civil War ===
Governor Gilpin left Missouri and arrived in Denver City on May 29, 1861, to cheering crowds. Despite his warm reception, his administration was plagued with difficulties from the outset. The territory had been organized at the start of the Civil War and faced a complex set of threats, including Confederate sympathizers within the territory, the possibility of a Confederate invasion from outside, and looming tensions with Native Americans (in particular the Arapaho and Cheyenne) in the wake of the withdrawal of U.S. Army troops in the region for other duties.

The imminent threats facing the territory prompted Gilpin to act quickly without receiving authorization from the federal government. He appointed a territorial military staff and, despite having no funds for military purposes, he began to solicit volunteers for a military regiment. Without funds, he took the daring step of issuing $375,000 in drafts on the federal treasury, with the expectation that the federal government would honor them later. He later claimed that he had received verbal authorization from Lincoln for issuing the drafts before leaving for Colorado.

At first, most of the merchants and citizens of the territory were willing to support Gilpin's fundraising campaign, but doubt began to spread through the territory after rumors from Washington, DC confirmed that the federal government did not intend to validate the drafts. By the summer of 1861, many of the citizens of the territory were in an uproar, and petitions were circulated calling for Gilpin's removal from office. The movement against him was fostered by the anger of William N. Byers, the powerful editor of the Rocky Mountain News, whose newspaper had been bypassed in favor of a rival in the awarding of the territorial printing contract. Under attack in his own state, Gilpin went to Washington to plead his case for the validation of the drafts. Despite the controversy, the funds already raised from the drafts allowed the creation of the 1st Colorado Volunteers, widely derided as "Gilpin's Pet Lambs". The regiment trained in the summer and fall of 1861 at Camp Weld near Denver.

The mustering and training of the regiment proved highly useful when the Confederates launched an invasion northward through the New Mexico Territory in the spring of 1862. The invasion, today called the New Mexico Campaign, aimed to seize the mineral-rich Colorado Territory and eventually California. The 1st Colorado Volunteers played a critical role in repelling the Confederates, routing the Texans at the Battle of Glorieta Pass, which became known as the "Gettysburg of the West".

Despite the enormous success of the regiment, the territory was mired in financial problems caused by Gilpin's drafts, which had tied up most of the circulating currency without any resolution regarding their validation. Eventually the federal treasury settled the drafts after being presented with itemized statements by their holders. The resolution came too late for Gilpin, on May 21, 1862 Lincoln removed him from the governorship of the territory and replaced him with John Evans.

== The Sangre de Cristo Land Grant ==
In 1863, Gilpin and a syndicate of foreign investors bought the 1,038,196-acre (4,201.43 km^{2}) Charles H. Beaubien land grant (often referred to as the Sangre de Cristo Land Grant on the west slopes of the Sangre de Cristo Mountains) in southern Colorado for about 4 cents an acre ($41,000). Gilpin and his investors then tried to evict residents on the property. Litigation over the property continues to this day. He was also one of the early owners of the Luis Maria Baca Grant No. 4.

== Personal life and death ==
Gilpin was married to Julia Pratte Dickerson, a widow from St Louis. Together, they were longtime employers of Julia Greeley, also from Missouri, who later became one of the world's few venerated African-American Catholics.

He died on January 20, 1894, aged 80, in Denver, after being run over by a horse and buggy. He was buried in Mount Olivet Cemetery, in Wheat Ridge.

== See also ==
- History of Colorado
- Law and government of Colorado
- List of governors of Colorado
- Territory of Colorado
