= 1st Colorado Infantry Regiment =

Former American military unit

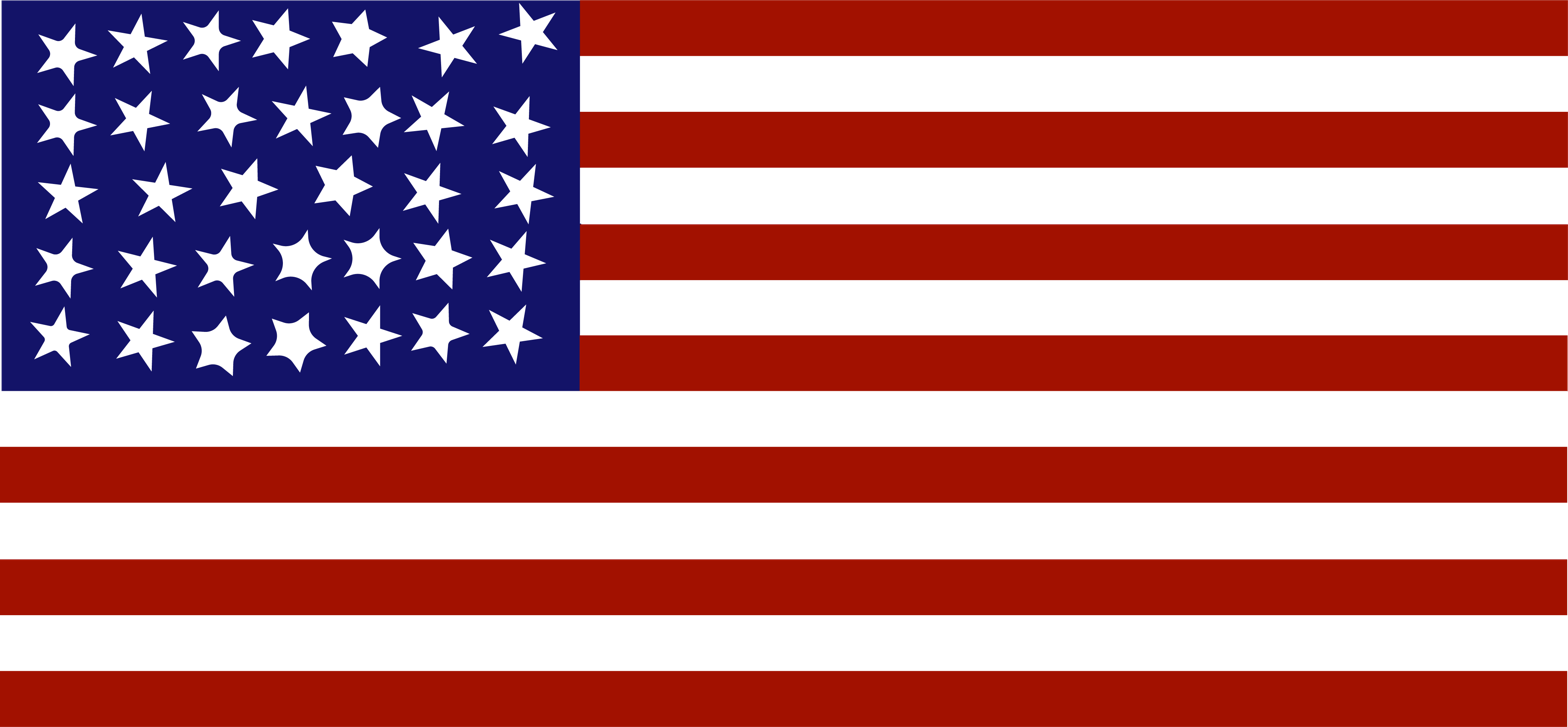
- National color of the regiment
- Active: August 1861 to November 1862
- Country: United States
- Allegiance: Union
- Branch: Infantry
- Engagements: American Civil War: Battle of Glorieta Pass; Battle of Peralta

The 1st Colorado Infantry Regiment (officially the 1st Regiment of Colorado Volunteers) was a volunteer infantry regiment of the United States Army formed in the Colorado Territory in 1861 and active in the American West in the late 19th century.

== History ==
The regiment was formed shortly after the outbreak of the American Civil War by order of William Gilpin, the first governor of the territory. Recruiters began enlisting men in August 1861, just six months after the organization of the territory. Known as "Gilpin's Pet Lambs" for the involvement of the governor in its formation, the regiment served in the Western Theater, at first serving in various detachments throughout the territory.

The regiment's most notable service came in the New Mexico Campaign in the spring of 1862, in which they helped repulse the advance of the Army of New Mexico under Henry Hopkins Sibley at the battles of Glorieta Pass and Peralta.

In November 1862, the unit was reorganized along with Companies C and D of the 2nd Colorado Infantry into the 1st Colorado Cavalry. (This was done since the US War Department believed cavalry would be better in protecting the Western trails and for fighting the various Indian tribes.)

The first colonel of the regiment was John P. Slough, replaced in April 1862 by Major John Chivington, later chastised for his role as commander of the 3rd Colorado Cavalry in the November 1864 Sand Creek Massacre.

There is a group of reenactors who portray the First Colorado (Company D) in Denver. The unit celebrated 50 years in 2024.

== Flags ==
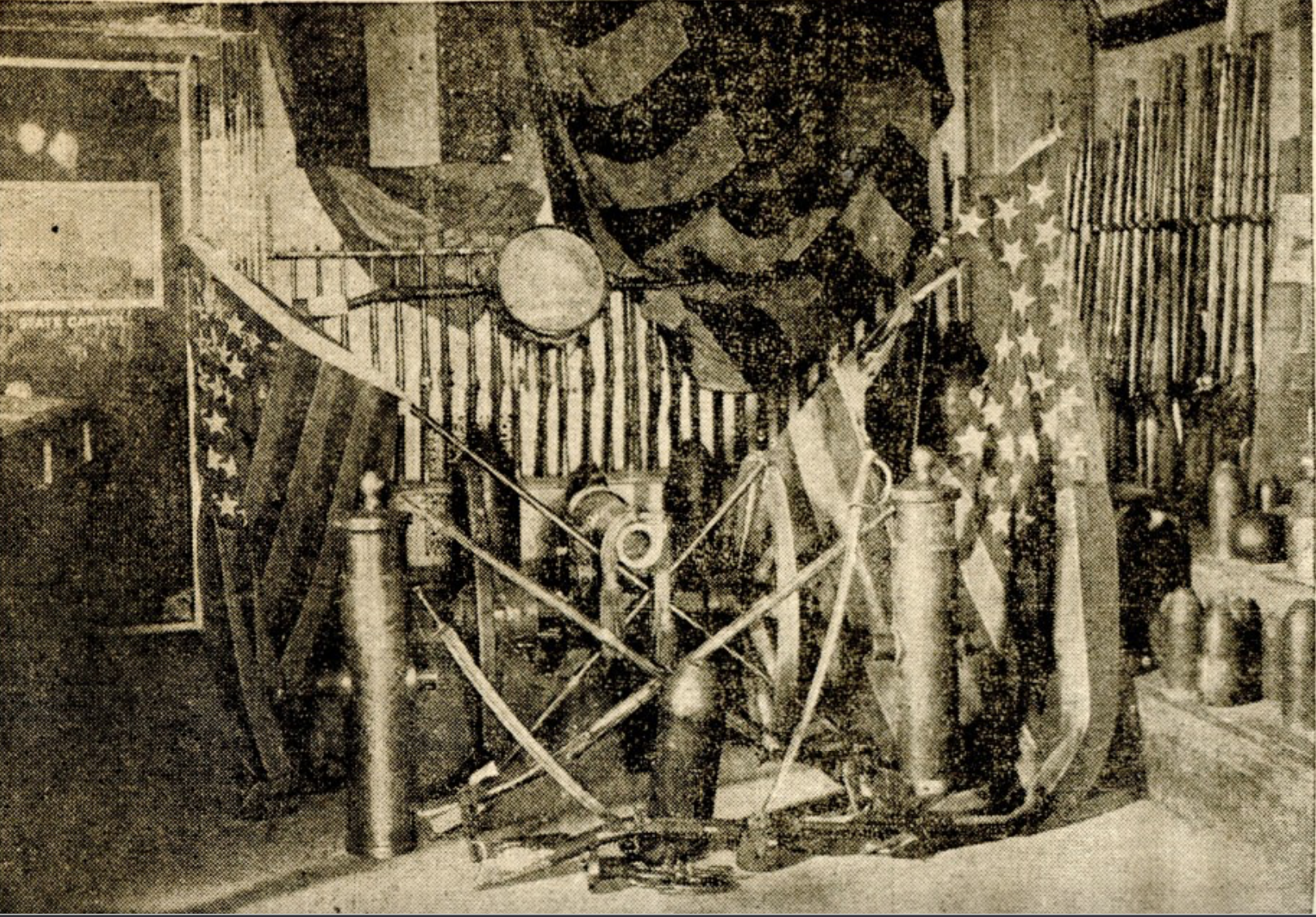
Regimental flag on the right, 1903

The regiment carried an 34 star American flag that measured 48 by 105.5 inches. The flag was given to the regiment on November 10, 1861 by secretary Weld at Fort Weld. It was carried thought-out New Mexico Territory during the war. During the Battle of Glorieta Pass the flag was hit by enemy fire which left a hole near the canton. After the battle the regiment was given a new flag. The old flag was later presented to the state by a veteran of company D in 1897.

The flag carried by Company A, 1861

Company A had their own flag it was given to them in August of 1861. The flag’s design was based off the national standard with 34 golden stars in the canton. The banner was made by Mrs. Sam Cashman and Mrs. J. S. Brown, daughters of Captain Richard Sopris, and Miss Taylor. After the war it was given to Captain Sopris. When he died, his widow presented it to the adjutant generate office in 1904.

== See also ==
- List of Colorado Territory Civil War units
- 157th Field Artillery Regiment (United States)
