= Confiscation Act of 1862 =

Act of US Congress

- Long title: An Act to suppress Insurrection, to punish Treason and Rebellion, to seize and confiscate the Property of Rebels, and for other Purposes.
- Nicknames: Second Confiscation Act
- Announced in: the 37th United States Congress

Citations
- Public law: Pub. L. 37–195
- Statutes at Large: 12 Stat. 589

Legislative history
- Introduced in the House as H.R. 471 & H.Res. 110 by Thomas D. Eliot (R–MA) & Horace Maynard (R–TN) on May 14, 1862 & July 15, 1862; Committee consideration by Senate Judiciary Committee; Passed the Senate on July 17, 1862; Passed the House on; Signed into law by President Abraham Lincoln on July 17, 1862

The Confiscation Act of 1862, or Second Confiscation Act, was a law passed by the United States Congress during the American Civil War. This statute was followed by the Emancipation Proclamation, which President Abraham Lincoln issued "in his joint capacity as President and Commander-in-Chief".

== History ==
The Confiscation Act was enacted on July 17, 1862. The defining characteristic of the act was that it called for court proceedings for seizure of land and property from disloyal citizens (supporters of the Confederacy) in the South as well as the emancipation of their slaves that came under Union control. Under this act, conviction of treason against the U.S. could be punishable by death or carry a minimum prison sentence of five years and a minimum fine of $10,000. This law also stated that any citizen convicted of aiding and abetting any person known to have committed treason against the United States could be imprisoned for up to 10 years and face a maximum fine of $200,000, if convicted. This law specifically targeted the seizure of property of any Confederate military officer, Confederate public office holder, persons who have taken an oath of allegiance to the Confederacy or any citizen of a loyal Union state who has given aid or support to any of the aforementioned traitors to the United States of America. This act helped the Union military because freed slaves could supply the forces with information to gain a strategic advantage over the Confederates.

Section 1 of the Act targeted treason, Section 2 more broadly targeted insurrection and rebellion, and Section 3 disqualified anyone who commits these offenses from serving in any federal office. These provisions regarding insurrection, rebellion, and disqualification remain substantially the same in the United States Code today. Neither the Act nor the federal Constitution define "insurrection" or "rebellion," but Supreme Court precedent understands the former term to mean any uprising against the lawful authority of the government, and the latter to mean such an uprising that has organized itself within a particular territory.

The most significant change over the first confiscation act was the final status of escaped slaves. While the first act did not make any determination on the final status of slaves after the war was over, the Second Act explicitly said that all slaves covered under it would be permanently freed.

One man, March Haynes, began smuggling people to the freedom of the Union lines with the help of Union General Quincy Adams Gilmore. In return for his help, Haynes provided Gilmore with "exact and valuable information" on the location of Confederate defenses and the strength of their forces.

== Insurrection or rebellion ==
Section 2 of the Second Confiscation Act says the following:

And be it further enacted, That if any person shall hereafter incite, set on foot, assist, or engage in any rebellion or insurrection against the authority of the United States, or the laws thereof, or shall give aid or comfort thereto, or shall engage in, or give aid and comfort to, any such existing rebellion or insurrection, and be convicted thereof, such person shall be punished by imprisonment for a period not exceeding ten years, or by a fine not exceeding ten thousand dollars, and by the liberation of all his slaves, if any he have; or by both of said punishments, at the discretion of the court.

Thus, specific penalties were added to the Insurrection Act of 1807. Section 2 has been lightly amended since 1862, and its current version is at 18 U.S. Code § 2383. Before 1862, insurrection was punishable under the law of treason, and Section 2 was enacted in part because "no one wanted all participants in the Civil War to be executed for treason", as law professor Mark Graber has put it.

== See also ==
- Confiscation Act of 1861
- Crimes Act of 1790
