= March Haynes =

African American abolitionist

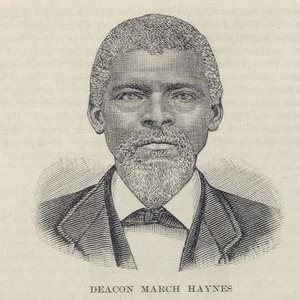
Deacon March Haynes

March Haynes (March 4, 1825 Pocotaligo, Jasper, South Carolina – July 16, 1899 Savannah, Chatham County, Georgia) was an African American abolitionist. He freed over three hundred enslaved people using his knowledge of the waterways of Savannah, Georgia, after his enslaver, John C. Rowland became a prisoner during the American Civil War.

Though little is known of Haynes's early life, he became a member of Wilmington Baptist Church in 1838.

== Fall of Fort Pulaski ==
During 1858 Haynes relocated to Savannah, Georgia where he became the property of John C. Rowland. He hired Haynes out as a boat pilot and stevedore involved in the transportation of goods. Traveling the waterways and marshes of the Savannah watershed provided him with knowledge of the area that would later prove valuable. After Rowland enlisted in the Confederate Army in 1861 and was sent to Fort Pulaski, Haynes joined him working in the fort as a carpenter.

After a 30-hour bombardment by the Union Army, Fort Pulaski was taken by the Union Army on April 11, 1862.

May 9, 1862 General David Hunter issued his General Order No.11, in which he stated martial law had commenced April 25, 1862. Furthermore, he announced:

Slavery and martial law in a free country are altogether incompatible; the persons in these three States, Georgia, Florida, and South Carolina, heretofore held as slaves are therefore declared forever free.

After the fall of Fort Pulaski, Haynes made the acquaintance of Union Chaplain Frederic Denison. Denison described Haynes as being one of "two remarkable negroes of large native ability" along with Robert Smalls. Denison makes note of Haynes's "character and worth" noting he had been severely wounded, learned to read as a slave, and acted as a stevedore in Savannah. A year later, in April 1863, Haynes was reported to have been jailed for "harboring and running off to the Yankees several Negroes from" Savannah.

Haynes formally joined the United States Colored Troops on August 20, 1864

== Underground Railroad ==
Haynes was accomplished in assisting people to reach freedom from Savannah to Fort Pulaski by boat. Making reconnaissances at night, he would secretly enter the city to gather information and bring away enslaved people by the boatload. He spent days gathering information on rebel forts, batteries, and camps. One of his expeditions had been delayed until after dawn resulting in an encounter with a group of six Confederate soldiers. During an exchange of fire three of the opposing men were felled by March. He himself escaped capture though wounded in the thigh.

== Later life ==
In 1849 he became a deacon of Savannah's First African Baptist Church.
