= Council of Forty-four =

Institution of traditional Cheyenne tribal governance

The Council of Forty-four is one of the two central institutions of traditional Cheyenne Native American tribal governance, the other being the military societies such as the Dog Soldiers.

The Council of Forty-four is the council of chiefs, comprising four chiefs from each of the ten Cheyenne bands plus four principal or "Old Man" chiefs who had previously served on the council with distinction. Early in Cheyenne history, three related tribes known as the Heviqs-nipahis, the Sutaio and the Masikota, unified themselves to form the Tsé-tsêhéstâhese or the "Like Hearted People" who are known today as the "Cheyenne." The unified tribe then divided themselves into ten bands:

- Heviqs-nipahis
- Hévhaitanio (Heévâhetaneo'o)
- Masikota
- Omísis (Ôhmésêheseo'o)
- Sutáio (Só'taeo'o)
- Wotápio
- Oivimána (Oévemana)
- Hisíometanio (Hesé'omeétaneo'o)
- Oqtóguna
- Hónowa (Háovôhnóva)

Council chiefs are generally older men who command wide respect.

Historically, they were responsible for day-to-day matters affecting the tribe as well as the maintenance of peace both within and without the tribe by force of their moral authority. While chiefs of individual bands held primary responsibility for decisions affecting their own bands, matters which involved the entire tribe such as treaties and alliances required discussions by the entire Council of Forty-four. Chiefs were not chosen by vote, but rather by the Council of Forty-four, whose members named their own successors, with chiefs generally chosen for periods of ten years at councils held every four years. Many chiefs were chosen from among the ranks of the military societies, but were required to give up their society memberships upon selection.

== Military societies ==
While chiefs were responsible for overall governance of individual bands and the tribe as a whole, the headmen of military societies were in charge of maintaining discipline within the tribe, overseeing tribal hunts and ceremonies, and providing military leadership. Council chiefs selected which of the six military societies would assume these duties; after a period of time on-duty, the chiefs would select a different society to take up the duties.

== Changes to tribal government ==
Beginning in the 1830s, the Dog Soldiers had evolved from the Cheyenne military society of the same name into a separate, composite band of Cheyenne and Lakota warriors that took as its territory the headwaters country of the Republican and Smoky Hill rivers in southern Nebraska, northern Kansas, and the northeast of Colorado Territory. By the 1860s, as conflict between Indians and encroaching whites intensified, the influence wielded by the militaristic Dog Soldiers, together with that of the military societies within other Cheyenne bands, had become a significant counter to the influence of the traditional Council of Forty-four chiefs, who were more likely to favor peace with the whites.

The Sand Creek Massacre of November 29, 1864, besides causing a heavy loss of life and material possessions by the Cheyenne and Arapaho bands present at Sand Creek, also devastated the Cheyenne's traditional government, due to the deaths at Sand Creek of eight of 44 members of the Council of Forty-four, including White Antelope, One Eye, Yellow Wolf, Big Man, Bear Man, War Bonnet, Spotted Crow, and Bear Robe, as well as headmen of some of the Cheyenne's military societies. Among the chiefs killed were most of those who had advocated peace with white settlers and the U.S. government. The effect of this on Cheyenne society was to exacerbate the social and political rift between the traditional council chiefs and their followers on the one hand and the Dog Soldiers on the other. To the Dog Soldiers, the Sand Creek Massacre illustrated the folly of the peace chiefs' policy of accommodating the whites through the signing of treaties such as the first Treaty of Fort Laramie and the Treaty of Fort Wise and vindicated the Dog Soldiers' own militant posture towards the whites. The traditional Cheyenne clan system, upon which the system of choosing chiefs for the Council of Forty-four depended, was seriously undermined by the events at Sand Creek. The moral authority of traditional Council chiefs to moderate the behavior of the tribe's young men and to treat with whites was severely hampered by these events as well as the ascendancy of the Dog Soldiers' militant policies.

== Today ==
The Cheyenne Tribe maintains the Council of Forty-Four today, and some of current Peace Chiefs that are active in the Native American community include Gordon Yellowman, Sr.; Harvey Pratt; W. Richard West Jr.; and Lawrence Hart. Ben Nighthorse Campbell was a member of the North Cheyenne Council of Forty-Four before his death in December 2025.

== See also ==
- Lean Bear (1813–1864)

== Bibliography ==
- Greene, Jerome A. (2004). Washita, The Southern Cheyenne and the U.S. Army. Campaigns and Commanders Series, vol. 3. Norman, OK: University of Oklahoma Press. ISBN 0-8061-3551-4.
- Hoig, Stan. (1980). The Peace Chiefs of the Cheyennes. Norman, OK: University of Oklahoma Press. ISBN 0-8061-1573-4.
- Hyde, George E. (1968). Life of George Bent Written from His Letters. Ed. by Savoie Lottinville. Norman, OK: University of Oklahoma Press. ISBN 0-8061-1577-7.
