= Yellow Wolf =

Yellow Wolf may refer to:

- Yellow Wolf (Cheyenne) (died 1864), a chief of the Southern Cheyenne
- Yellow Wolf (Comanche) (died 1854), a chief of the Penateka Comanche
- Yellow Wolf (Nez Perce) (died 1935), a member of the Nez Perce, warrior who fought on the Nez Perce's flight to Canada
