= White antelope =

White antelope may refer to:

- Addax, an antelope
- Robin Pecknold, a musician associated with the indie folk band Fleet Foxes
- White Antelope (Cheyenne chief), c. 1789 - 1864, killed in the Sand Creek massacre
