= Lean Bear =

Cheyenne peace chief

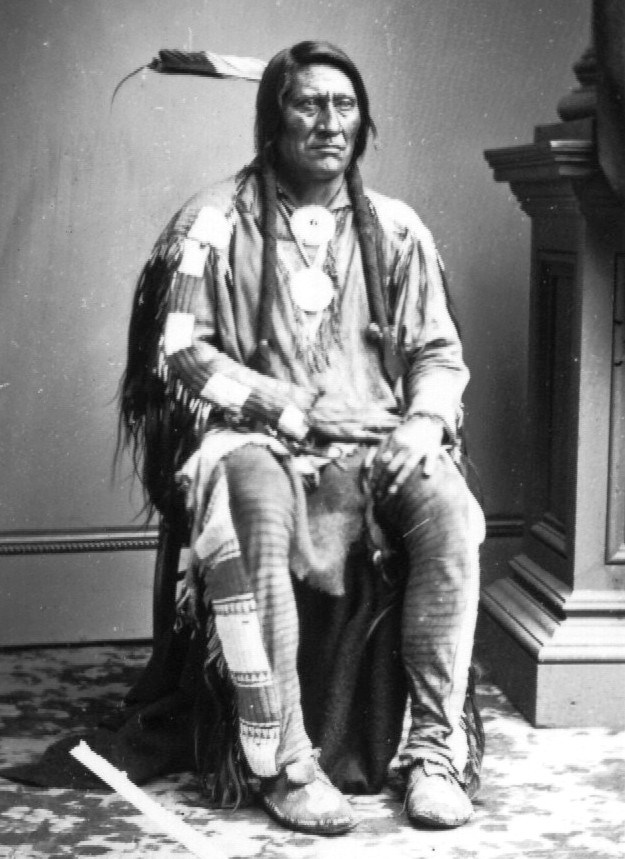
Cheyenne Peace Chief believed to be Lean Bear. Taken 1863, in Washington, D.C.

Lean Bear (Cheyenne: Ávoonenáhkohe; (Note: alternately transcribed as Awoninahku) c. 1813–1864), alternatively translated as Starving Bear, was a Cheyenne peace chief. He was a member of the Council of Forty-four, a tribal governance devoted to maintaining peace with encroaching United States settlers. Lean Bear's most notable peace deals include the Treaty of Fort Wise and a meeting with US President Abraham Lincoln. His work towards peace between his people and the American settlers in the Southern Plains was cut short when he was killed by the 1st Colorado Cavalry Regiment and violent retaliations ensued.

== Personal life ==
Lean Bear suffered from vertigo, which commonly ran in the family. During a meeting with President Abraham Lincoln in 1863, he suffered an attack and spoke while seated in a chair. Lean Bear brushed it off as a result of him simply being too nervous to stand.

=== Relations ===
Lean Bear had a brother called Bull Bear. In 1864, Bull Bear was the leader of the Dog Soldiers, a position he would hold for many years.

Lean Bear also worked closely and served on the Council of Forty-four with fellow peace chief Black Kettle, especially in the last decade of his life.

== Political life ==
The first known historical account of Lean Bear is from 1851. He was roughly 35 at this time. Agent Thomas Fitzpatrick was hosting a council in Fort Atkinson to convince plains tribes to attend a larger peace council at Fort Laramie later on. The Comanche, Kiowa, Apache, Arapaho, and Cheyenne people went out to meet the soldiers and each other. They feasted and traded goods. Fitzpatrick spoke with each group, and eventually convinced the Arapaho and Cheyenne tribes to attend the next peace council. The other tribes refused, wary about bringing their horses up north near tribes that were notorious for stealing horses.

The troops were beginning to leave as the council ended when Colonel Sumner arrived at Fort Atkinson on his way to New Mexico. He stayed for a few days to trade and obtain some horses from the tribes in attendance. After some time, the tribes began to freely explore both the fort and his camp, and Fitzpatrick grew nervous at the opportunities for conflict. Lean Bear, who was in attendance at the peace council, was fascinated by the rings and bracelets on the hand of Sumner's wife and grabbed to get a better look. She reacted by pulling her hand back and screaming, provoking Sumner to rush forward to beat Lean Bear. Because Cheyenne culture considers striking even a male child to be an insult, Lean Bear was incredibly indignant about the assault. He painted his face and rode around his camp announcing his plans to attack the whites, inviting his brothers to join him. Fitzpatrick initially refused to make reparations until some Kiowas and Comanches told him that the Cheyennes were getting ready to attack. A meeting was later arranged for Colonel Sumner to present Lean Bear with a blanket in apology, which he accepted.

=== Council of Forty-Four ===
Lean Bear was chosen to join the Council of Forty-four by past chiefs, as the council chose its own successors. The council worked to sway their people towards a preference for peace with the Americans. Once named a chief of the council, one would have to give up membership in the war societies that new chiefs often came from. These efforts contrasted with the increasingly vocal Dog Soldiers, bands of Cheyennes who held a longstanding opposition to white settlement and did not wait to cooperate and make peace. They stole livestock and fought with troops and settlers. The Dog Soldiers were exiled for their behavior and deemed renegades, operating independently of the tribe. Nonetheless, their provocative nature caused a lot of trouble for the peace-seeking Cheyennes.

=== Treaty of Fort Wise ===
In October 1857, Chief Lean Bear and three other Cheyenne chiefs approached William Bent with concern about attacks on his people by Sumner's troops along the Republican River. Bent then sent a letter to Washington, D.C., on their behalf, stating that the Cheyenne chiefs would like to speak with someone from the government. The response came in 1860, when Commissioner A.B. Greenwood met the chiefs at Fort Wise. Chief Lean Bear was one of the principal signers in the Treaty of Fort Wise in 1861. This treaty was made with Cheyenne and Arapaho chiefs, cutting roughly 40 million acres of land from their territory.

There were mixed responses to the deal, including scorn from the Dog Soldiers, because only six Cheyenne chiefs were present to sign the treaty, when all forty-four are typically needed when treaties and alliances are being made. The deal was made in an attempt to keep peace as pioneers spread near Indian territory, but the land reduction and the continued encroachment by white settlers only heightened tensions. The Cheyennes were not ready to forced into the confines of the small reserve, where there were not many buffalo, allocated for them in the treaty.

=== Meeting in Washington, D.C. ===
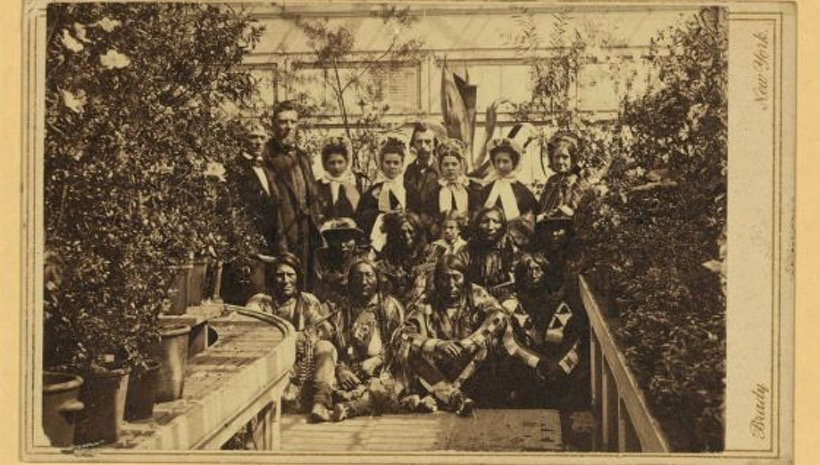
The delegation of chiefs meeting with Lincoln on March 27, 1863. Lean Bear is believed to be one of the people in the lower left of the image.

On March 27, 1863, a delegation of fourteen chiefs of Plains tribes, including Lean Bear, War Bonnet and Standing-in-Water of the Cheyennes, and two Kiowa women met with President Abraham Lincoln in the East room of the White House. The meeting was called after skirmishes with Native tribes and white settlers created fear that Southern Plains tribes would side with the Confederacy. Lincoln was hoping to persuade Native Nations to either ally with the Union, or pledge neutrality.

Lincoln welcomed the chiefs, explaining that white Americans had conquered an expansive population, territory, and wealth that white Americans had gained. Lean Bear implored the president to stop his white Americans from being violent so that Indians and whites alike could travel across the plains without risk. Lincoln told the chiefs that their Native people were naturally more tempted to violence. He further explained that in order to survive and be prosperous, the Native Americans would have to adopt methods of cultivating the land that were more similar to the way of the whites. Lincoln also requested that the southern Plains Indians remain neutral in the American Civil War, ready to provide peace medals to those that he could reach an agreement with. The chiefs complied, promising to uphold peace treaties and not align with the Confederacy. Lean Bear then made a request to the president to expedite his and the other chiefs' journey home.

== Murder of Lean Bear ==
On May 16, 1864, less than 15 months after meeting Lincoln in Washington, Lean Bear, Black Kettle, and others in the tribe were camping on their buffalo hunting grounds near Ash Creek. The 1st Colorado Regiment, under the command of Lieutenant George Eayre, approached the group. Although there had been a fight around a month previous involving Cheyenne Dog Soldiers at Fremont's Orchard, Lean Bear was confident that the violence wouldn't be associated with his peaceful tribe and was not concerned as the soldiers got closer. Positive that this would be a peaceful encounter, Lean Bear went alone to meet the militia to show his peaceful intentions. On his chest, Lean Bear proudly wore his peace medal that he had received on his trip to Washington D.C. in 1863. In his hand, he held an official document signed by President Lincoln stating that he was peaceful and friendly with whites. What Lean Bear did not realize was that Eayre's troops were operating under orders from Colonel John M. Chivington to "kill Cheyennes whenever and wherever found." Eayre ordered his men to shoot Lean Bear, who was wounded and fell off his horse. He was then shot repeatedly by the soldiers as they rode past his body on the ground.

The troops rode on to attack other Cheyennes at the camp, killing at least one more warrior and wounding many others at the camp. Cheyenne warriors armed themselves and mounted their horses, ready to retaliate. Black Kettle rode out to de-escalate the situation, stopping any further violence, and the American troops retreated to Fort Larned.

=== Aftermath of the killing ===
Rising tensions caused by the death of Lean Bear, along with Eayre's other Indian camp raids, is heavily attributed to the Sand Creek Massacre that occurred six months later. Lean Bear's brother, Bull Bear, was livid after the killing and felt compelled to violence against the white men, a desire he had never felt before. Bull Bear remarked that his brother had died while trying to keep peace with the settlers, and he expected to die in the same way. He called for war but was shot down at a meeting with Wynkoop, the Fort Lyon Commander, on September 10, 1864. Despite Black Kettle's best efforts to keep the peace, attacks by Native warriors in the Southern Plains skyrocketed as the vengeful tribes burned ranches and trails, kidnapping settlers and their livestock. Over time, the Dog Soldiers' popularity rose, and they overrode Black Kettle's efforts to resist war. The Governor of Colorado issued a proclamation giving each citizen permission and encouragement to retaliate by killing any Indians and seek compensation for stolen property.

== Legacy ==
There are no confirmed images of Lean Bear. There are only images and paintings of the full room in 1863 when the delegation went to meet president Lincoln. There are many differing accounts on the identities of each chief in the image. In common usage by sources about Lean Bear is an image of a Cheyenne peace chief who is typically believed to be Lean Bear.

Parts of Lean Bear's life are described in the book of folklore, By Cheyenne Campfires, compiled by George Bird Grinnell.

== Bibliography ==
- Ricky, Donald B. Indians of Nebraska. Somerset Publishers, 2007. ISBN 978-0403099290.
