= White Antelope (Cheyenne chief) =

North American Indian leader (c. 1789 – 1864)

- Vó'kaa'e Ȯhvó'komaestse
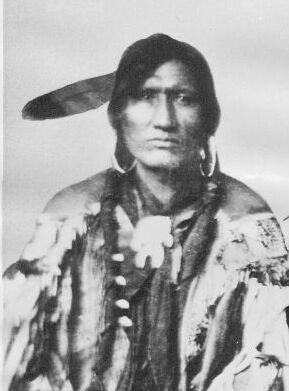
- White Antelope in 1851
- Born: c. 1789
- Died: November 29, 1864 (aged 75)
- Cause of death: Killed in the Sand Creek massacre
- Known for: Chief of the Southern Cheyenne

White Antelope (Cheyenne: Vó'kaa'e Ȯhvó'komaestse; (Note: Also given as Wōkaī hwō'kō mǎs and Wō' kaī hwō'kō mǎ ǐs) c. 1789 – November 29, 1864) was a chief of the Southern Cheyenne. He was known for his advocacy of peace between white Americans living in the Great Plains until his killing at the Sand Creek massacre. Accounts of the massacre conflict as to whether White Antelope led his people in resistance to the attack or continued to advocate for peace until his death. White Antelope's body was desecrated after the massacre, and the blanket he was wearing stolen.

In his early years he became known as a great warrior, and was later involved in several treaties regarding the land of the Cheyenne. During the 1860s, despite worsening relations between the Cheyenne and white people living in Colorado, White Antelope remained optimistic that peace could be achieved. Led by John Chivington to believe that his people would be safe there, White Antelope and other Cheyenne chiefs led their people in peace to Fort Lyon. They settled with Arapaho on Sand Creek. On November 29, 1864, Chivington brought a force of hundreds of soldiers and began firing on the town unprovoked. After his killing, the song that White Antelope supposedly sang as he died became well-known, and has been used at events commemorating the massacre: "nothing lives long ... only the earth and mountains ..."

== Biography ==
=== Early years ===
White Antelope was born c. 1789 into the Southern Cheyenne tribe in the Great Plains. What is known of his early years is recorded in oral histories, which describe him as having been a "great warrior." These histories record him having been part of at least two conflicts: an 1826 raid led by Yellow Wolf of a horse herd along the North Fork Red River held by the Kiowa, and the 1838 Battle of Wolf Creek between the Cheyenne and the Kiowa. During that battle, he fought in the Crooked Lance Society, and was reported to have been one of "the bravest" there. He made the final decision to end the battle with fellow Cheyenne warrior Little Old Man. George Bird Grinnell, in his 1956 The Fighting Cheyennes, described White Antelope as having been one of the main figures involved in peace negotiations that took place in 1840 between the Kiowa, Cheyenne, and Comanche tribes.

After Wolf Creek and the peace negotiations, White Antelope seems to have become an important chief among the Cheyenne. He appears at least three times in accounts written by white Americans traveling through their territory. The first, in 1842, was written by Bill Hamilton, who reported that he stopped at a town led by White Antelope on the banks of Cherry Creek. William Boggs described a raid two years later undertaken by White Antelope on a Pawnee village. Boggs wrote that the raid saw White Antelope leave on his own during the winter, only returning after about six weeks and with eleven human scalps. By this point, his tribe had thought him dead. Finally, in 1848 Hamilton met with 75 Cheyennes led by White Antelope. At their second meeting, Hamilton later described his impression of White Antelope as "a noted chief and a proud and fine looking warrior."

At some point he had a son, also known as White Antelope.

=== Involvement in treaties ===
While White Antelope did not sign the 1851 Treaty of Fort Laramie, he was selected to visit Washington, D.C., in the aftermath of the treaty's signing, traveling with Alights-on-the-Cloud and Little Chief. White Antelope signed a revised version of the treaty two years later. He was with his people during a July 1857 punitive expedition by the American army under Edwin Vose Sumner. He protested the attack as unjustified in an October trip to Bent's Fort. Two years later, White Antelope and other Cheyenne chiefs received gifts brought by William A. Phillips, which they distributed among their people.

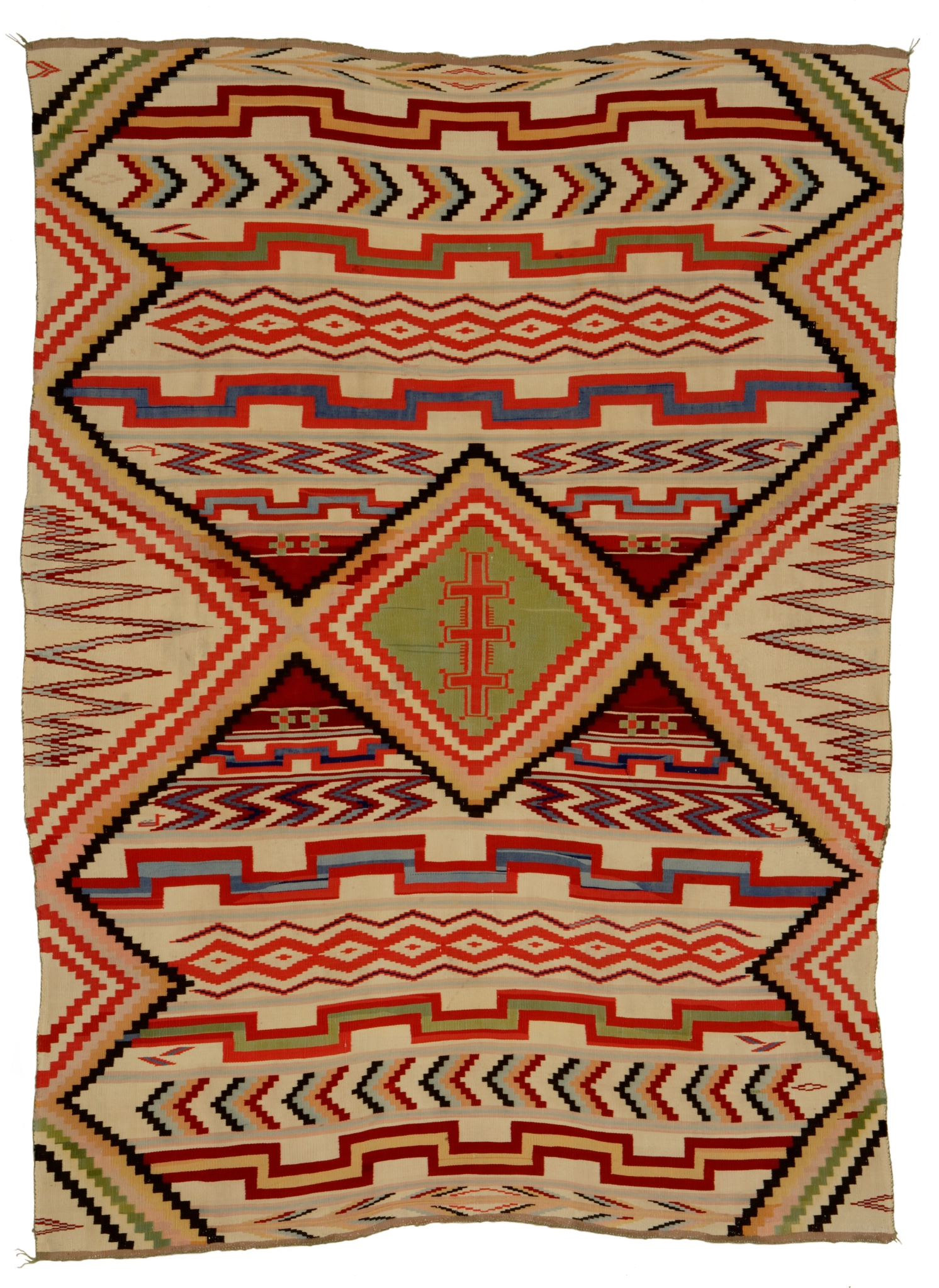
Chief White Antelope blanket

After returning from Washington, White Antelope became known not as a warrior, but as an advocate of peace between white Americans and the native tribes living on the Great Plains. By the late 1850s, many white Americans were no longer willing to follow past treaties that had been signed with the Cheyenne about their land, as gold had been found there, and they resolved to renegotiate the terms. White Antelope was reportedly involved in the ensuing negotiations, and his name is signed to the 1861 Treaty of Fort Wise that emerged, relegating the Cheyenne to a small reservation. White Antelope later condemned the treaty as a "swindle", saying that his name had been added to the Treaty without his consent. In the 1860s he again visited Washington, meeting with Abraham Lincoln.

=== Sand Creek massacre ===
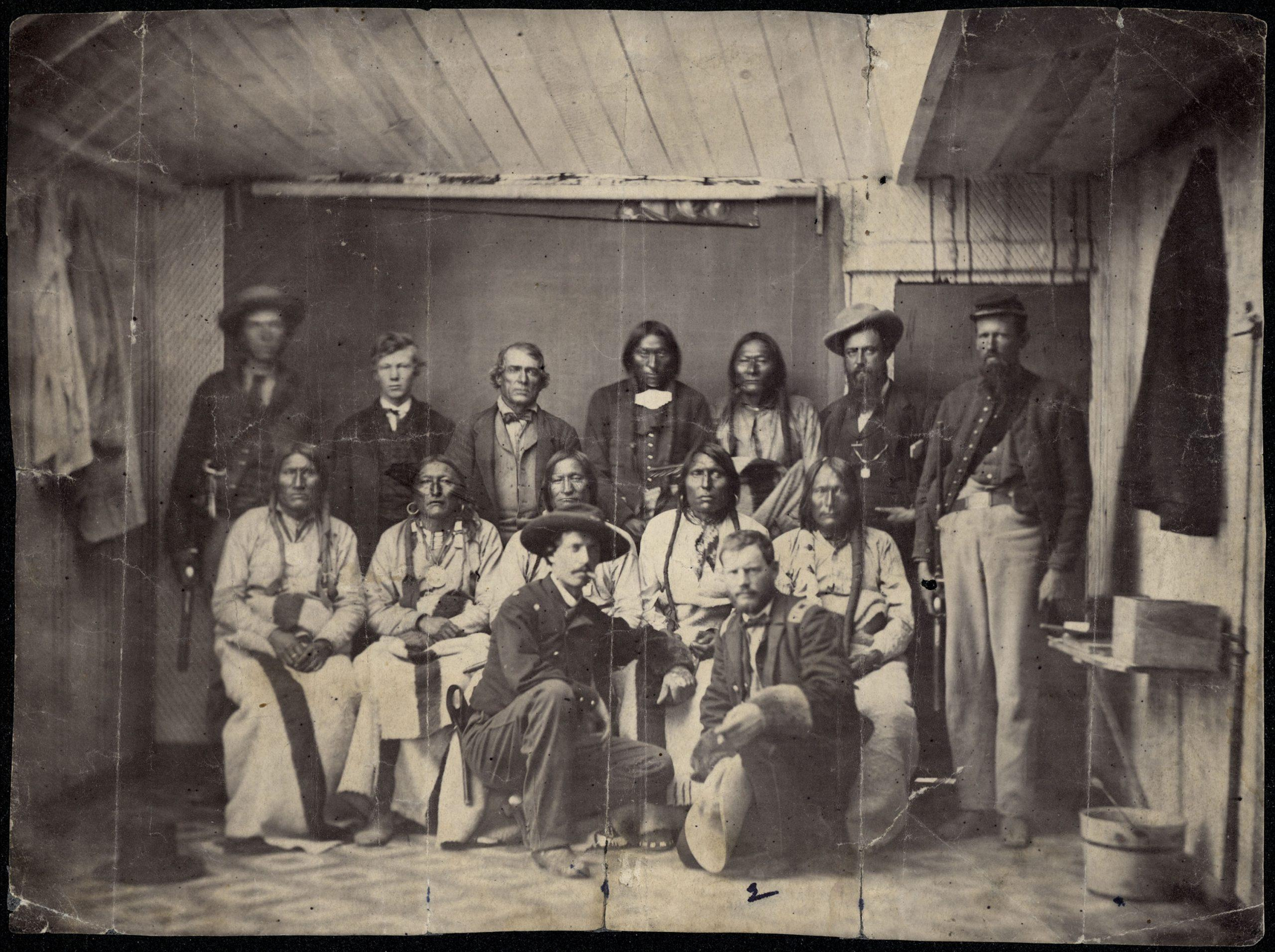
Conference at Camp Weld on September 28, 1864. Some of the identifications of Natives are uncertain. White Antelope may be the figure on the far left of the middle row.

Relations between the Cheyenne and white Americans living on the Great Plains declined during the 1860s, as many Cheyenne refused to move to the reservation and instead attempted to remain on their traditional buffalo hunting lands. With the outbreak of the American Civil War in 1861, more soldiers were stationed in Colorado. In 1864, John Chivington led the First Regiment of Colorado Volunteers. That summer, they began killing, according to historian Stan Hoig, any and all Cheyenne they came upon, ostensibly as a form of retaliation for reported theft of livestock. Several Cheyenne settlements were completely destroyed.

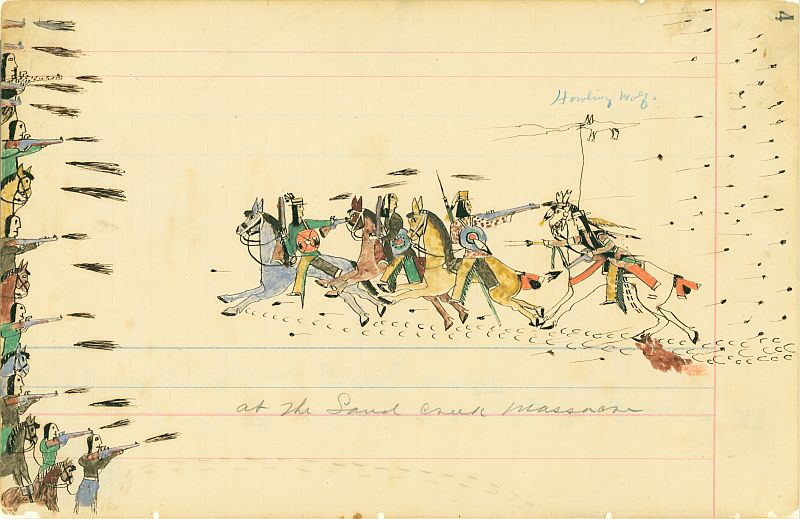
A depiction of one scene at Sand Creek by witness Howling Wolf

At the end of the summer of violence, in August 1864, Cheyenne and Arapaho including White Antelope and Black Kettle attempted to negotiate for peace, writing to Fort Lyon. White Antelope and Black Kettle were involved in further negotiations in the weeks that followed: they were in groups that met with Major Edward W. Wynkoop and, in late September, Governor of Colorado John Evans. Though many in his tribe warned him against trusting what he was told, White Antelope remained optimistic about the possibility for peace. He was the oldest of the chiefs who attended the meeting with Evans, later known as the "Camp Weld Council". There, White Antelope denied that his people had stolen livestock, and emphasized his desire to insure the safety of his people. At the September meeting, Chivington made a statement that was interpreted by the Cheyenne and Arapaho as promising that his men would protect those who went in peace to Fort Lyon. Hoig writes that Chivington's meaning (a promise of safety) was "crystal clear". White Antelope also believed this promise, encouraging Cheyenne to travel with him to Fort Lyon.

In response, White Antelope and Black Kettle resolved that they would move their people near the fort. Major Scott Anthony, then in command of the fort, told the Cheyenne and Arapaho that they should settle nearby, on Sand Creek. They did so. Holg describes the settlement at this point as holding "most of the peace chiefs of the Southern Cheyennes". On November 29, ignoring efforts at peace, Chivington brought a force of hundreds of soldiers to the town. Hoig writes that upon seeing soldiers, White Antelope and Black Kettle told their people that they would be safe and raised a flag, which was either an American flag or a white flag. Unprovoked by the Cheyenne, Chivington's forces began to fire on the settlement, commencing the Sand Creek massacre.

=== Death ===
There are conflicting accounts of what happened next. Several accounts of the massacre describe White Antelope as leading resistance to the soldiers. Lieutenant Andrew J. Templeton, Private David H. Louderback, and Private Safely, all in the forces under Chivington, later described White Antelope as running forward with a gun in hand and opening fire on the troops. Louderback wrote that he was killed in Sand Creek, while Safely wrote that he advanced as close as 50 yards (46 m) before Safely shot White Antelope and another gunshot to the head killed him. Templeton attributed White Antelope's killing to another private. John Smith, also with Chivington, wrote that White Antelope was the first to be killed in the massacre.

Other accounts, including that of George Bent, offer different accounts of White Antelope's death, establishing him as having been an advocate of peace. Bent writes that White Antelope remained in his lodge, where sang his death song and was killed. This account originated with Black Kettle.

In another account, written by James Beckwourth, who was present with Chivington, White Antelope ran forward, shouting at the soldiers to stop. Beckwourth recorded White Antelope as speaking in "as plain English as I can". He soon realized these efforts were in vain and stopped moving forward. Cheyenne survivors later reported that he began to sing a death song:

nothing lives long ... only the earth and mountains ...

As he did so, Beckwourth wrote that he "folded his arms until shot down." Historian Gregory Michno concludes that while it is not clear which of these accounts are correct, all accounts agree that White Antelope was killed by soldiers during the massacre.

== Legacy ==
His body was found in the riverbed of Sand Creek, and desecrated by soldiers who cut off his nose, ears, and scrotum; his scrotum was reportedly made into a tobacco pouch. A blanket that he was wearing when killed was stolen by an American soldier. In the later half of the 20th century, descendants of White Antelope attempted to receive reparations for his killing, as promised in the Little Arkansas Treaty following the massacre.

Historian Ari Kelman writes that the death of many chiefs in the massacre, including White Antelope, was a loss at a "critical moment" for the tribe, and the impact "reverberated across generations."

County Road 54, also known as Chief White Antelope Way, near the site of the Sand Creek massacre.

White Antelope's blanket became known as the "Chief White Antelope blanket". It was placed on display at the Laboratory of Anthropology in 1937. The blanket was later dated to around 1864. As of 2021, the blanket is still held by the Laboratory of Anthropology, now known as the School for Advanced Research. The museum views its role as functioning as a steward "of the blanket for the Cheyenne and Arapaho community and Chief White Antelope and Sand Creek descendants," and brings it to gatherings of the Cheyenne every two years.

County Road 54, near the site of the massacre, is named "Chief White Antelope Way".

White Antelope's death song has become associated with the Sand Creek massacre. Versions have been sung in a number of remembrances of the massacre, including a performance by Northern Cheyenne singers on November 29, 2002, at the state capitol in Denver, at a 2008 interment of remains from the massacre repatriated to the Cheyenne, and in 2020 at the Sand Creek massacre commemoration.

== Bibliography ==
- Brown, Dee (2009). Bury My Heart at Wounded Knee: An Indian History of the American West. Sterling Publishing Company, Inc. ISBN 978-1-4027-6066-2.
- Grinnell, George Bird (1915). The Fighting Cheyennes. Charles Scribner's Sons.
- Hoig, Stan (1990). The Peace Chiefs of the Cheyennes. University of Oklahoma Press. ISBN 978-0-8061-2262-5.
- Thrapp, Dan L. (1991). Encyclopedia of Frontier Biography: P-Z. U of Nebraska Press. ISBN 978-0-8032-9420-2.
- Michno, Gregory (2017). The Three Battles of Sand Creek: The Cheyenne Massacre in Blood, in Court, and as the End of History. Savas Beatie. ISBN 978-1-61121-312-6.
- Kelman, Ari (2013). A Misplaced Massacre: Struggling over the Memory of Sand Creek. Harvard University Press. ISBN 978-0-674-06717-2.
