= Ari Kelman =

American academic

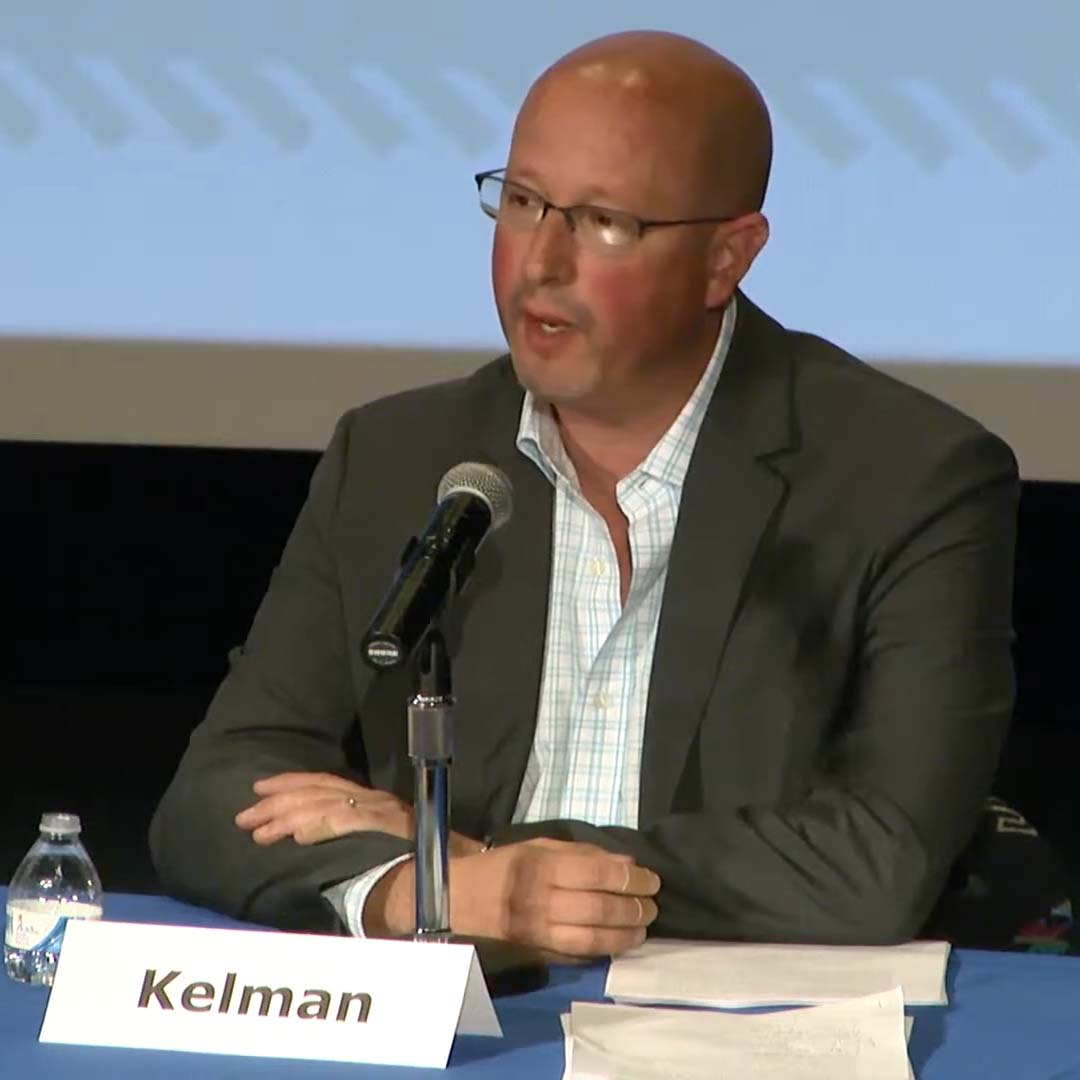
- Title: Chancellor’s Leadership Professor of History
- Awards: Bancroft Prize (2014)

Academic background
- Education: University of Wisconsin-Madison; Brown University

Ari Kelman (born 1968) is Chancellor’s Leadership Professor of History at University of California, Davis. Until 2016, he was the McCabe Greer Professor of History at Penn State University. His fields of specialization are the U.S. Civil War, Western, Native American, and environmental history. Kelman's book, A Misplaced Massacre, won the 2014 Bancroft Prize, Avery O. Craven Award, Tom Watson Brown Book Award, and Robert M. Utley Prize.

== Education ==
Kelman received his Bachelor of Arts in history from the University of Wisconsin-Madison in 1991. He completed his graduate and doctoral work in history at Brown University, receiving a Master of Arts in 1993 and a Ph.D. in 1998.

== Books ==
Kelman's first book, A River and Its City (University of California Press, 2003; paperback 2006), is an environmental history of the city of New Orleans, especially focusing on the city's uneasy relationship with the Mississippi River. A River and Its City won the 2004 Abbott Lowell Cummings Prize, awarded annually "to the publication that has made the most significant contribution to the study of vernacular architecture and cultural landscapes of North America."

His second book, A Misplaced Massacre (Harvard University Press, 2013), explores the struggles over how the notorious Sand Creek massacre of 1864 should be remembered, beginning in the immediate aftermath of the violence and continuing through the opening of the Sand Creek Massacre National Historic Site. Through archival research and oral history interviews, Kelman documents how National Park Service employees, local landowners, and descendants of victims of the Sand Creek massacre worked together to develop an appropriate memorial for the historic site. A Misplaced Massacre has been reviewed extensively. The title of the work was derived from Kelman's own realization that the descendants' claim for the location of the massacre, rather than himself, were correct. This was the result of a river having moved over the course of roughly 150 years.

His most recent book, with artist Jonathan Fetter-Vorm, is a non-fiction graphic novel entitled Battle Lines: A Graphic History of the Civil War (Hill & Wang, 2015).

== Other work ==
During and after Hurricane Katrina, Kelman wrote articles describing New Orleans' environmental history for such popular media outlets as The Nation, Slate, and The Christian Science Monitor. From 2005-2007, Kelman was senior creative consultant for the PBS series, American Experience: New Orleans. He is a regular contributor to The Times Literary Supplement. Kelman also co-founded the award-winning blog The Edge of the American West.
