= Yellow Wolf (Cheyenne) =

Cheyenne leader

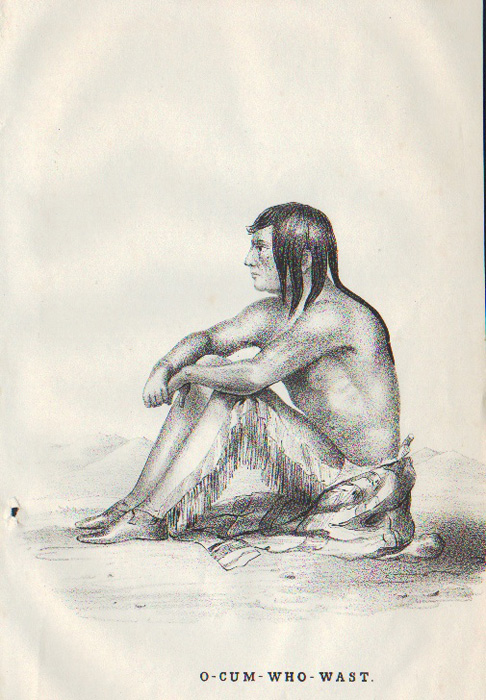
Yellow Wolf (O-Cum-Who-Wast) of the Cheyenne, from an 1848 engraving of a painting by James W. Albert.

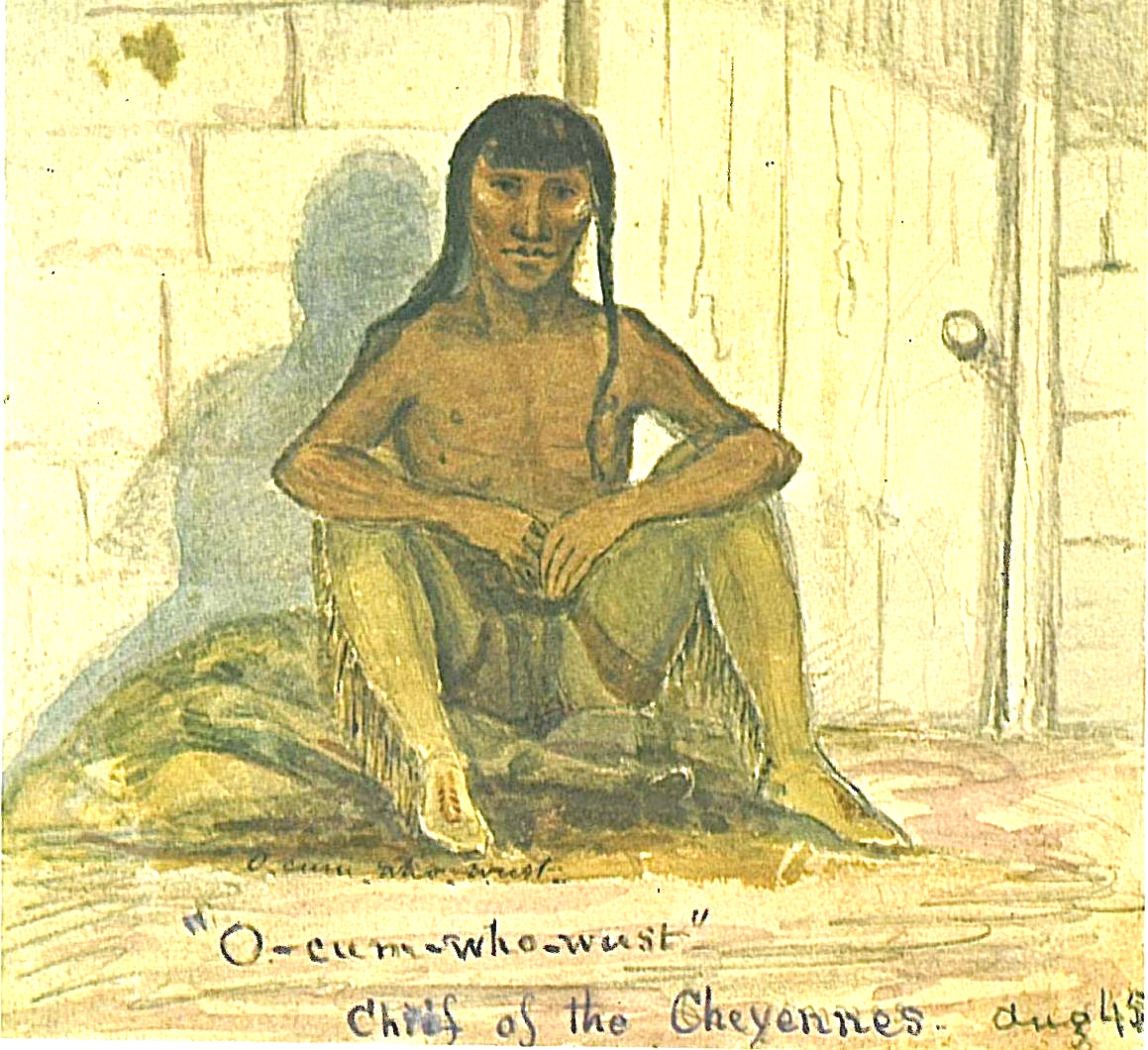
O-Cum-Who-Wust, from an August 1845 painting by James W. Albert.

Yellow Wolf or Ho'néoxheóvaestse (died 1864) was a Cheyenne Chief who led the Rope Hair group of the Southern Cheyenne. He lived to be 85 years old, and died in 1864 along with his brother at Sand Creek, Colorado, at the Sand Creek Massacre, which disrupted the traditional Cheyenne power structure, because of the deaths of eight members of the Council of Forty-Four. The massacre took place when two militia units, the 1st and 3rd Colorado Regiments, attacked the tribe when they were camping. More than 150 died in the attack; women and children and the elderly were not spared.

Yellow Wolf was held up by George Grinnell, in 1915, as a leader who worked for peace. He said that he was a "constant worker" on behalf of peace. He said it was patriotic work, done out of love for the tribe and its future that he worked in this direction.

Yellow Wolf had a son, Red Moon, who lived through the battle and went on to become another prominent chief.
