= Big Sandy Creek (Colorado) =

Big Sandy Creek Heséovó'eo'hé'ke (chy)
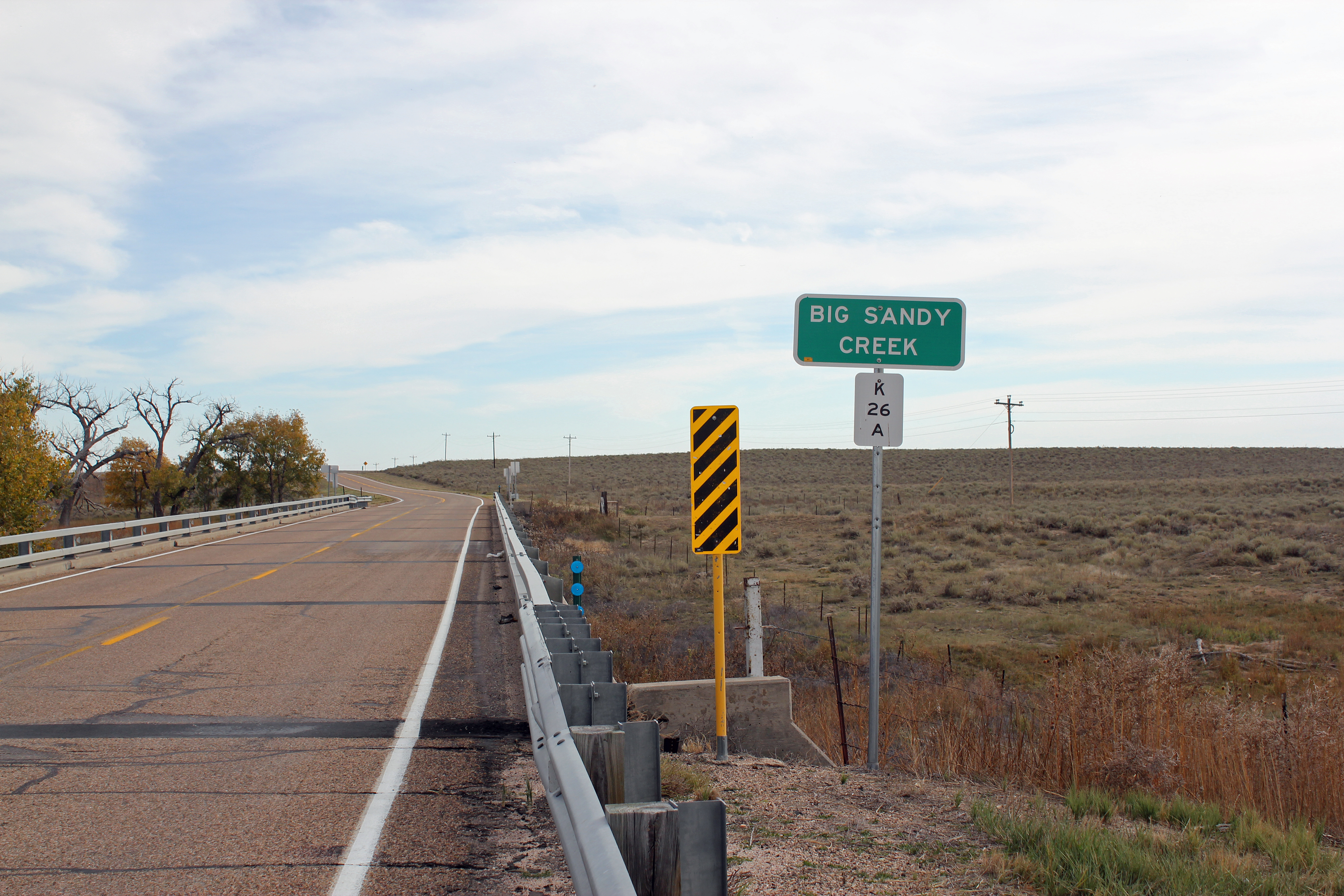
- The creek at Colorado State Highway 96 in Kiowa County.

Physical characteristics
- Source
  - location: El Paso County, Colorado
  - coordinates: 39°04′38″N 104°27′20″W
- Mouth
  - location: Confluence with the Arkansas
  - coordinates: 38°06′43″N 102°29′03″W
  - elevation: 3,547 ft (1,081 m)
- Basin size: 1,863 mi^{2} (4,830 km^{2})

Basin features
- Progression: Arkansas—Mississippi

Big Sandy Creek (Cheyenne: Heséovó'eo'hé'ke) is a 211-mile-long (340 km) tributary of the Arkansas River noted for being the location of the Sand Creek Massacre in Kiowa County. Long stretches are dry most of the time on the surface, although water still flows underground. Big Sandy Creek starts near Peyton in El Paso County, Colorado and flows through Elbert, Lincoln, Cheyenne and Kiowa counties before it joins with the Arkansas River in Prowers county east of Lamar.

== See also ==
- List of rivers of Colorado
