= Treaty of Fort Wise =

1861 treaty between the United States and representatives of the Cheyenne and Arapaho

The Treaty of Fort Wise of 1861 was a treaty entered into between the United States and six chiefs of the Southern Cheyenne and four of the Southern Arapaho Indian tribes. A significant proportion of Cheyennes opposed this treaty on the grounds that only a minority of Cheyenne chiefs had signed, and without the consent or approval of the rest of the tribe. Different responses to the treaty became a source of conflict between whites and Indians, leading to the Colorado War of 1864, including the Sand Creek Massacre.

== Treaty of Fort Laramie (1851) ==
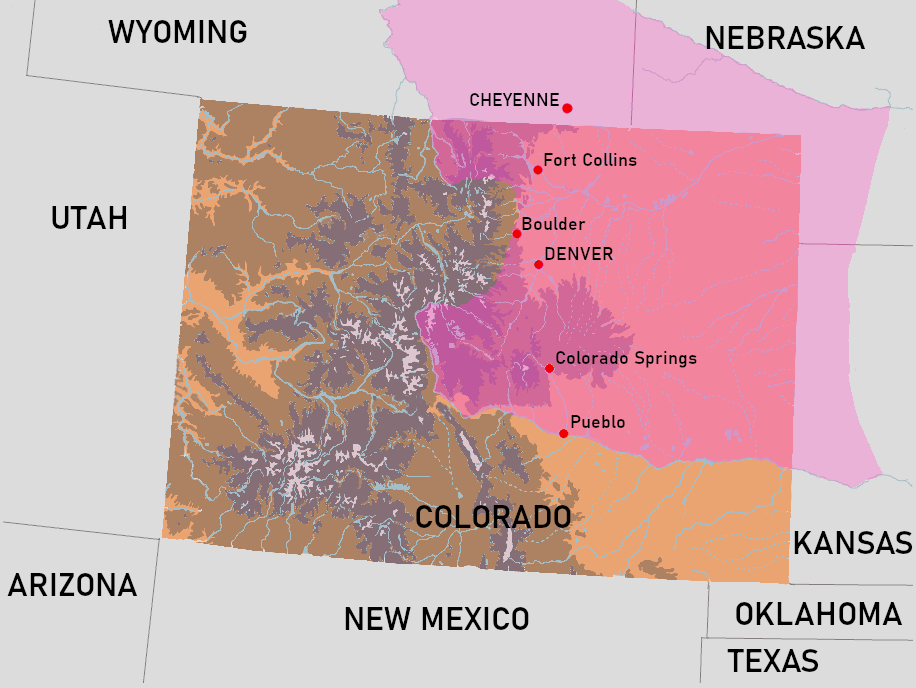
Approximate territory of the Arapaho and Cheyenne Indian tribes in 1851

By the terms of the 1851 Treaty of Fort Laramie between the United States and the Cheyenne, the Arapaho, and other tribes, The treaty allocated a vast territory to the Cheyenne and Arapaho encompassing lands between the North Platte River and Arkansas River and eastward from the Rocky Mountains to western Kansas. This area included present-day southeastern Wyoming, southwestern Nebraska, most of eastern Colorado, and the westernmost portions of Kansas. However, the discovery in November 1858 of gold in the Rocky Mountains in Colorado (then part of the western Kansas Territory) brought on a gold rush and a consequent flood of white emigration across Cheyenne and Arapaho lands. Colorado territorial officials pressured federal authorities to redefine and further restrict the lands where Indians could live, according to the earlier treaties. In the fall of 1860, A.B. Greenwood, Commissioner of Indian Affairs, arrived at Bent's New Fort along the Arkansas River to negotiate a new treaty.

== Treaty of Fort Wise (1861) ==
On February 18, 1861, six chiefs of the Southern Cheyenne and four of the Arapaho signed the Treaty of Fort Wise with the United States, at Bent's New Fort at Big Timbers near what is now Lamar, Colorado, recently leased by the U.S. Government and renamed Fort Wise, in which they ceded to the United States most of the lands designated to them by the Fort Laramie treaty. The Cheyenne chiefs were Black Kettle, White Antelope, Lean Bear, Little Wolf, Tall Bear, and Left Hand; the Arapaho chiefs were Little Raven, Storm, Shave-Head, and Big Mouth.

The new reserve, less than one-thirteenth the size of the 1851 reserve, was located in eastern Colorado along the Arkansas River between the northern boundary of New Mexico and Sand Creek. Some bands of Cheyenne including the Dog Soldiers, a militaristic band of Cheyennes and Lakotas that had evolved beginning in the 1830s, were angry at those chiefs who had signed the treaty, disavowing the treaty and refusing to abide by its constraints. They continued to live and hunt in the bison-rich lands of eastern Colorado and western Kansas, becoming increasingly belligerent over the tide of white immigration across their lands, particularly in the Smoky Hill River country of Kansas, along which whites had opened a new trail to the gold fields. Cheyennes opposed to the treaty said that it had been signed by a small minority of the chiefs without the consent or approval of the rest of the tribe, that the signatories had not understood what they signed, and that they had been bribed to sign by a large distribution of gifts. The whites, however, claimed the treaty was a "solemn obligation" and considered that those Indians who refused to abide by it were hostile and planning a war.

== Colorado War and Sand Creek Massacre ==
The beginning of the American Civil War in 1861 led to the organization of military forces in Colorado Territory. In March 1862, the Coloradans defeated the Texas Confederate Army in the Battle of Glorieta Pass in New Mexico. Following the battle, the First Regiment of Colorado Volunteers returned to Colorado Territory and were mounted as a home guard under the command of Colonel John Chivington. Chivington and Colorado territorial governor John Evans adopted a hard line against Indians. Continuing escalation led to the Colorado War of 1864–1865. On November 29, 1864, troops under Chivington attacked a peaceful Cheyenne and Arapaho camp at Sand Creek on the reserve established for them under the Treaty of Fort Wise. This event became known as the Sand Creek Massacre.
