= Sand Creek massacre =

1864 US troop murders of Native Americans

- Part of the Colorado War, the American Indian Wars, and the American Civil War
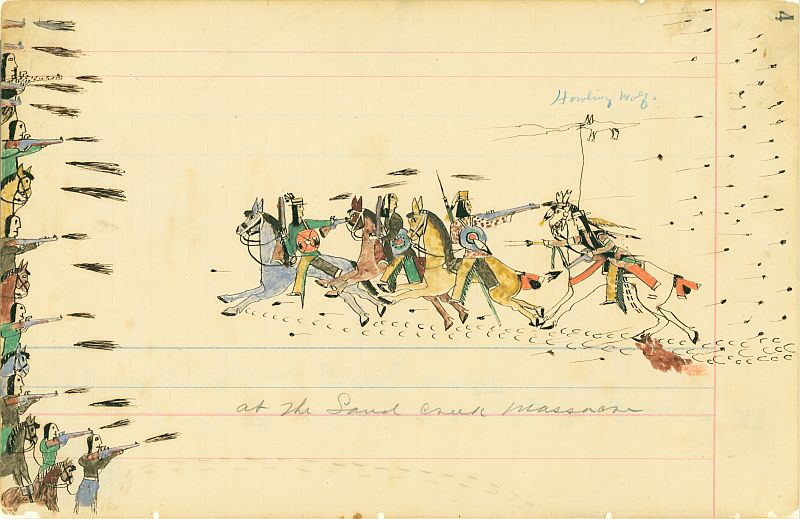
- A depiction of one scene at Sand Creek by witness Howling Wolf
Date	November 29, 1864
Location	Colorado Territory; Present-day Kiowa County, Colorado 38°32′58″N 102°30′41″W
Result	See § Aftermath

Belligerents
United States (Union)	Cheyenne; Arapaho

Commanders and leaders
John Chivington	Black Kettle

Strength
700	70–200

Casualties and losses
24 killed 52 wounded	70–600 killed

The Sand Creek massacre (also known as the Chivington massacre, the battle of Sand Creek or the massacre of Cheyenne Indians) was a massacre of Cheyenne and Arapaho people by the U.S. Army in the American Indian Wars that occurred on November 29, 1864, when a 675-man force of the Third Colorado Cavalry under the command of U.S. Volunteers Colonel John Chivington attacked a village of Cheyenne and Arapaho people in southeastern Colorado Territory, killing and mutilating an estimated 70 to over 600 Native American people. Chivington claimed 500 to 600 warriors were killed. However, most sources estimate around 150 people were killed, about two-thirds of whom were women and children. The location has been designated the Sand Creek Massacre National Historic Site and is administered by the National Park Service. The massacre is considered part of a series of events known as the Colorado Wars.

== Background ==
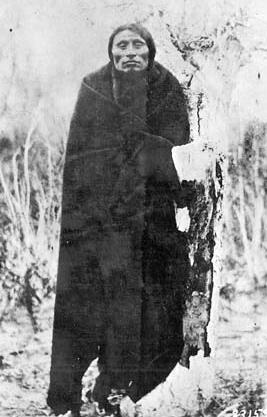
Treaty of Fort Wise signatory Ó'kôhómôxháahketa of the Cheyenne, known as Little Wolf (more correctly translated as Little Coyote), photographed May 1868 at Ft Laramie

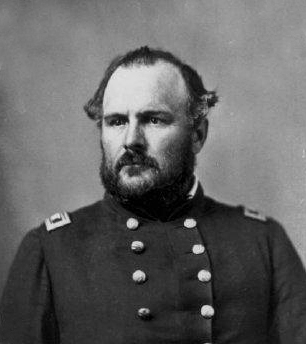
U.S. Volunteers Colonel John Chivington.

=== Treaty of Fort Laramie ===
By the terms of the Fort Laramie Treaty of 1851 between the United States and seven Native American nations, including the Cheyenne and Arapaho, the United States recognized that the Cheyenne and Arapaho held a vast territory encompassing the lands between the North Platte River and the Arkansas River, and eastward from the Rocky Mountains to western Kansas. This area included present-day southeastern Wyoming, southwestern Nebraska, most of eastern Colorado, and the westernmost portions of Kansas.

In November 1858, however, the discovery of gold in the Rocky Mountains in Colorado, then part of the Kansas Territory, brought on the Pikes Peak Gold Rush. European immigrants flooded across Cheyenne and Arapaho lands. They competed for resources, and some settlers tried to stay. Colorado territorial officials pressured federal authorities to redefine the extent of Native American lands in the territory, and in the fall of 1860, A.B. Greenwood, Commissioner of Indian Affairs, arrived at Bent's New Fort, along the Arkansas River, to negotiate a new treaty.

=== Native lands restricted ===
On February 18, 1861, six chiefs of the Southern Cheyenne and four of the Arapaho signed the Treaty of Fort Wise with the United States, in which they ceded most of the lands designated to them by the Fort Laramie treaty. The Cheyenne chiefs included Black Kettle, White Antelope (Vó'kaa'e Ohvó'komaestse), Lean Bear, Little Wolf, and Lean Bear; the Arapaho chiefs included Little Raven, Storm, Shave-Head, Big Mouth, and Niwot, or Left Hand. The Cheyenne warriors denounced the chiefs who signed the treaty and even threatened them with death if they attempted to carry out the treaty's provisions.

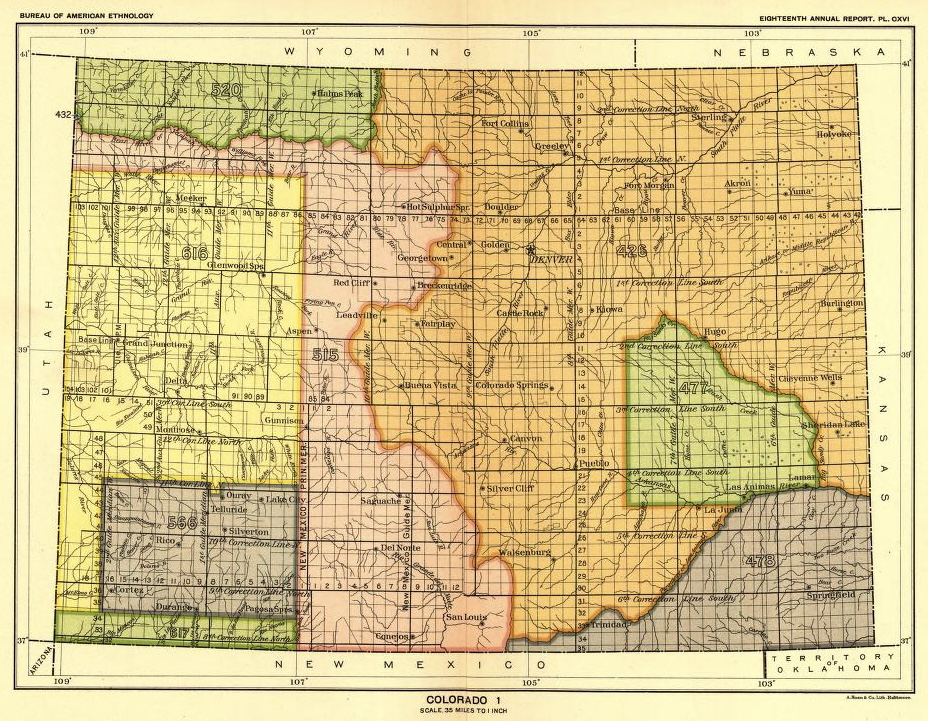
"Colorado 1" map, Indian Land Cessions in the United States (1899): Big Sandy Creek marks the eastern boundary of area 477, colored in green

The new reserve, less than 1/13 the size of the territory recognized in the 1851 treaty, was located in eastern Colorado, between the Arkansas River and Sand Creek. Most bands of the Cheyenne, including the Dog Soldiers, a militaristic band of Cheyenne and Lakota that had originated in the late 1830s, were angry at the chiefs who had signed the treaty. They disavowed the treaty—which never received the blessing of the Council of 44, the supreme tribal authority—and refused to abide by its constraints. They continued to live and hunt in the bison-rich lands of what's now eastern Colorado and western Kansas, and became increasingly belligerent over the tide of white migration across their lands. Tensions were high, particularly in the Smoky Hill River country of Kansas, along which whites had opened a new trail to the gold fields. Cheyenne who opposed the treaty said it had been signed by a small minority of the chiefs without the consent or approval of the rest of the tribe, that the signatories had not understood what they signed, and that they had been bribed to sign by a large distribution of gifts. Officials took the position that Indians who refused to abide by it were hostile and planning a war. The Cheyenne started committing minor offenses in 1861. These offenses went unpunished and, subsequently, became more significant. The desire for war was so strong with the Cheyenne that Agent Lorey urged Governor John Evans to treat the Cheyenne anew in 1863. As agreed, Governor Evans went out to meet with the chiefs, but they did not show up to the appointed place. The governor sent his guide, Elbridge Gerry, out to try to find the chiefs. Gerry returned two weeks later saying that a council had been held wherein the chiefs decided not to meet with Governor Evans. Bull Bear offered to meet with the governor, but his warriors would not allow it.

=== Escalation of hostilities ===
At the end of 1863 and in the beginning of 1864, word was received that a coalition was to be formed among the plains tribes to "drive the whites out of the country." In the spring and summer of 1864, the Sioux, Comanches, Kiowas, Cheyennes, and Arapahos were engaged in active hostilities which led to the murder of numerous civilians, the destruction of livestock and crops, supplies to the region being cut off, and the Colorado settlers in danger of starvation or murder at the hands of the plains tribes.

On April 12, men of the 1st Colorado Cavalry Regiment attacked Cheyenne men near Frémont's Orchard without any first attempt at parley or peace.

On April 13, a herdsman working for Irving, Jackmann & Company reported that Cheyennes and Arapahos had driven off 60 oxen and 12 horses and mules from their camp south of Denver. George Bent (a half-Cheyenne, half-white man who survived the ensuing Sand Creek Massacre along with other members of his family and tribe) disputes this version of the story. According to Bent, "One day in April some Cheyennes from one of these camps were out hunting and found a number of oxen straying about among the sand hills. As they did not know to whom the animals belonged they drove them to camp, intending to keep them until someone could lay claim to them.... The Indians had no use for the oxen; there were plenty of buffalo on that range that winter, and the Indians never would eat "tame meat" when they could get buffalo."

A small contingent of soldiers, led by Lieutenant Clark Dunn, was sent to repossess the livestock. The ensuing confrontation resulted in the death of four of the soldiers, and the tribes maintained possession of the livestock.

Lieutenant George Eayre was also sent to find and demand return of the oxen. If the request to return the animals was refused, Eayre was to attack the camp. Without following the order to first parley, Eayre and his men burned and plundered Crow Chief's camp of seventy lodges, which they abandoned once they were alerted to the approach of Eayre's forces. Eayre's men then found, plundered, and burned Chief Coon's camp (which Coon's band had likewise fled after being alerted of Eayre's approach by their scouts).

On May 16, less than 15 months after meeting President Lincoln in Washington, Lean Bear, Black Kettle, and others in the tribe were camping on their buffalo hunting grounds near Ash Creek. The 1st Colorado Regiment, under the command of Lieutenant George Eayre, approached the group. Positive that this would be a peaceful encounter, Lean Bear went alone to meet the militia to show his peaceful intentions. On his chest, Lean Bear proudly wore his peace medal that he had received on his trip to Washington D.C. in 1863. In his hand, he held an official document signed by Lincoln stating that he was peaceful and friendly with whites. What Lean Bear did not realize was that Eayre's troops were operating under orders from Colonel John Chivington to "kill Cheyennes whenever and wherever found." Eayre ordered his men to shoot Lean Bear, who was wounded and fell off his horse. He was then shot repeatedly by the soldiers as they rode past his body on the ground. Newspaper reports and books from the era report that Cheyenne warriors attacked settlers and committed a number of atrocities in the summer of 1864 including the June 11 Hungate massacre.

The beginning of the American Civil War in 1861 led to the organization of military forces in Colorado Territory. However, the attention of the federal government was firmly fixed on defeating the Confederates. As a result, there was no significant military protection of wagon trains, settlers, settlements, communication lines, and supply wagons in the region. By the summer of 1864, nearly every stage was being attacked, emigrants were being cut off, and settlements were being raided continually. The settlers abandoned their farms and ranches and began seeking refuge in the major settlements such as Denver. A coordinated attack was carried out on August 8, 1864, where all the existing stage lines in the region were attacked. Between August 11 and September 7, Governor Evans sent multiple letters to Secretary of War Edward Stanton in an attempt to furnish military aid, but Stanton was unable to pull the Second Colorado Volunteers, led by Colonel Ford, off of the eastern Civil War front. As a result of the repeated calls for aid, authorization was granted to call up "one-hundred-days' men" to form the Third Colorado Volunteers.

In 1864, before the events of the Massacre of Sand Creek, there were 32 Indian attacks on record. These resulted in the death of 96 settlers, 21 being wounded, and eight being captured. Between 250 and 300 head of livestock were stolen, 12 wagon trains and stagecoaches were attacked, robbed, or destroyed, and nine ranches and settlements were raided. An exact number is unknown. It is likely higher. George Bent, a Dog Soldier in Black Kettle’s camp, wrote about going on wagon train raids. “Cheyennes made good many raids towards Denver” (Bent to Hyde 5-3-1905).

George Bent, a half-Cheyenne, who was a Dog Soldier (Warrior) in Black Kettle’s camp at Sand Creek, wrote letters to historians about the Cheyenne way of life and his experience at Sand Creek. He called Sand Creek a battle. “I went to different lodges to shake hands with Black Kettle, Little Robe, Bear Tongue, Red Moon and lot of my friends that I was with at battle of Sand Creek that were going back with Black Kettle (George Bent to George Hyde, 1/12/1906).

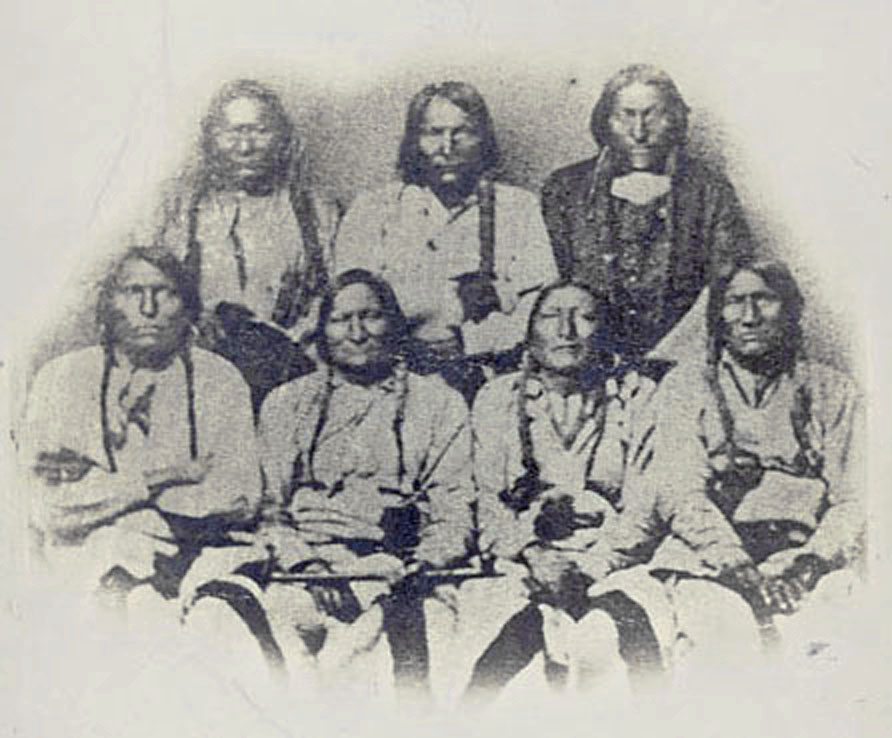
A delegation of Cheyenne, Kiowa, and Arapaho chiefs in Denver, Colorado at Fort Weld on September 28, 1864. Black Kettle is second from left in the front row.

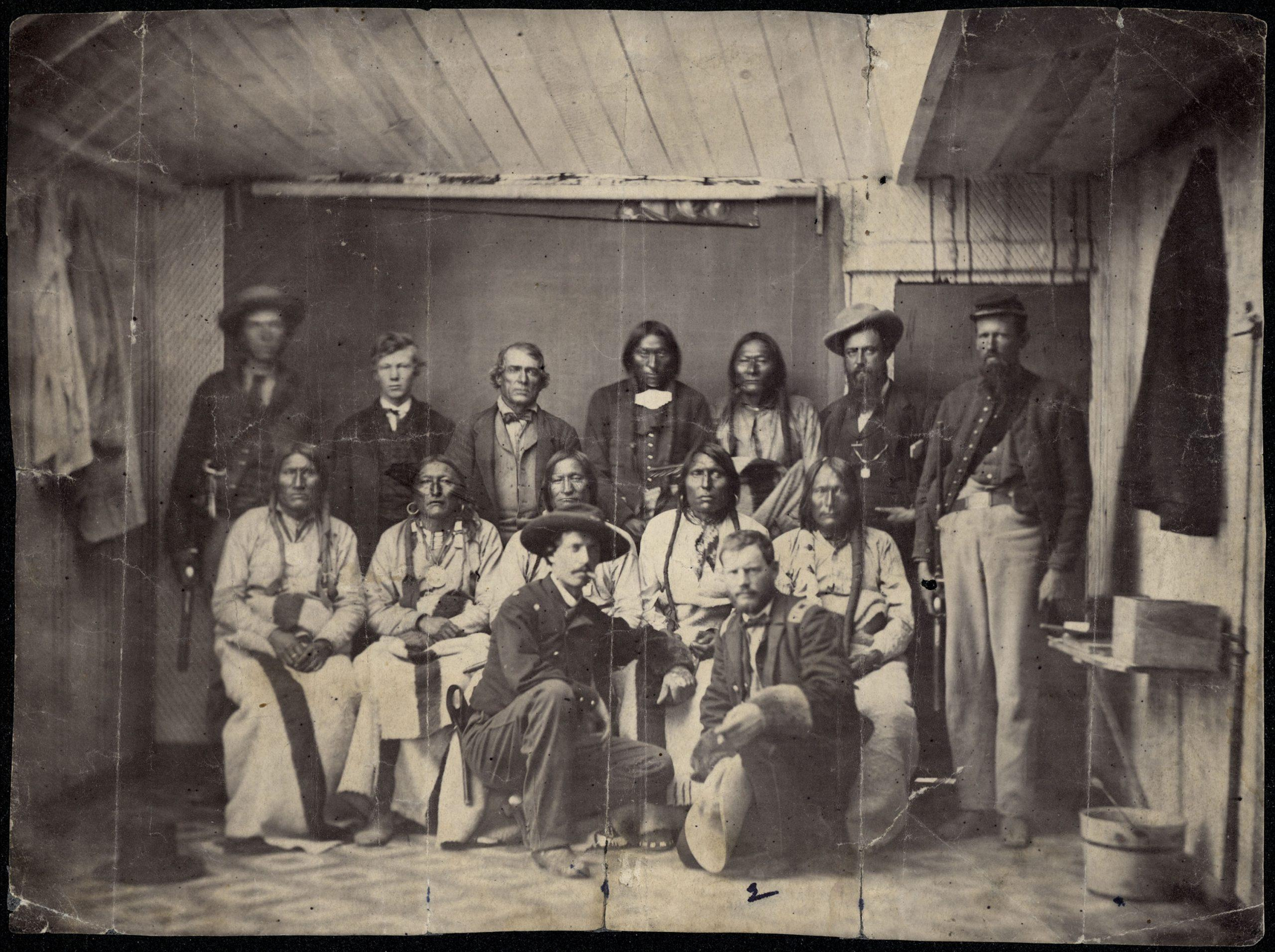
Conference at Fort Weld on September 28, 1864. Some of the identifications of Natives are uncertain. Front row, kneeling, left to right: Major Edward W. Wynkoop, commander at Fort Lyon and later agent for the Cheyennes and Arapahoes; Captain Silas S. Soule, provost marshal, later murdered in Denver. Middle row, seated, left to right: White Antelope (or perhaps White Wolf), Bull Bear, Black Kettle, One Eye, Natame (Arapaho). Back row, standing, left to right: Colorado militiaman, unknown civilian, John H. Smith (interpreter), Heap of Buffalo (Arapaho), Neva (Arapaho), unknown civilian, sentry. Another identification states that Neva is seated on the left and the man next to Smith is White Wolf (Cheyenne). Another Identification for back row starring 3rd from left: John Simpson Smith, Heap of Buffalo, Bosse, Dexter Colley, unidentified.

I am not a big war chief, but all the soldiers in this country are at my command. My rule of fighting white men or Indians is to fight them until they lay down their arms and submit to military authority. They are nearer to Major Wynkoop than any one else, and they can go to him when they get ready to do that.

— Col. John Milton Chivington, September 28, 1864 peace council in Denver

=== Warning of reckless violence by the U.S. volunteers ===
On June 15, 1864, Major T.I. McKenny, Assistant Adjutant-General of the Department of Kansas warned his superior, General Samuel Ryan Curtis that a few more reckless murders of Native Americans by the Volunteers risked uniting the various tribes into a general war against the US Army:

I think if great caution is not exercised on our part there will be a bloody war. It should be our policy to try and conciliate them, guard our mails and trains well to prevent theft, and stop these scouting parties that are roaming over the country who do not know one tribe from another, and who will kill anything in the shape of an Native American. It will require but few murders on the part of our troops to unite all these warlike tribes of the plains, who have been at peace for years and intermarried amongst one another. I do wish that some prudent, good man could be placed in command of the troops along the roads from Smoky Fork, on the Leavenworth road, to Walnut Creek, and from Cow Creek thorough to Fort Lyon, on the Kansas City or old Santa Fe road.

— Major T.I. McKenny

=== Governor Evans promises war ===
As the conflict between the Indians and settlers and soldiers in Colorado continued, the tribes would make war during the spring and summer months until subsistence became difficult to obtain. The tribes would then earnestly seek to make peace during the winter months, when they would stock up on supplies, arms, and munitions, until fairer weather would return and the war could be commenced anew. In July 1864, Colorado Governor John Evans sent a circular to the Plains Indians, inviting those who were friendly to go to a place of safety at Fort Lyon on the eastern plains, where their people would be given provisions and protection by the United States troops. The circular itself was dated June 27, 1864. It was not until three months later, September 28, that the Cheyenne came to Denver to have peace talks with Governor Evans. At this conference, the chiefs were told by Governor Evans that peace was not possible at that point and that "whatever peace they make must be with the soldiers, and not with me." At this council, White Antelope said that he feared the soldiers might kill some of his people while he was there. Governor Evans told him that there was great danger of it, and then he told White Antelope that one of the military chiefs (Colonel Chivington) was present and could tell the tribes what was necessary to secure peace. Governor Evans made clear that the purpose of the circular was not to extend peace, but rather it was an attempt to bring in the Indians who were friendly and were exposed to repudiation by the other tribes as a result. The messages given by the white negotiators at the September 28th meeting were highly contradictory. On the one hand, Governor Evans told the chiefs, "The time when you can make war best is in the summer; when I can make war best is in the winter. You, so far, have had the advantage. My time is just coming." On the other hand, Colonel Chivington told the assembled Chiefs that if they sought peace, they should come to Fort Lyon and be under the protection of Major Wynkoop. 652 Arapahos led by Chief Little Raven appeared at Fort Lyon beginning around November 6, 1864, and were subsisted there by Major Anthony who had replaced Wynkoop. Later, when 600 Cheyenne appeared at the fort in a similar manner they were turned away and denied subsistence by Major Anthony.

== Attack ==
=== Cheyenne camp near Fort Lyon ===
Damn any man who sympathizes with Indians! ... I have come to kill Indians, and believe it is right and honorable to use any means under God's heaven to kill Indians. ... Kill and scalp all, big and little; nits make lice.

— Colonel John Chivington

Black Kettle, leading chief of around 163 mostly Southern Cheyenne, had led his band, joined by some Arapahos under Chief Niwot, to Fort Lyon in compliance with provisions of a peace parley held in Denver in September 1864. After a while, the American Indians were asked to relocate to Big Sandy Creek, less than 40 miles northeast of Fort Lyon, under the threat of their safety. The Dog Soldiers, who had been responsible for many of the attacks and raids on whites, were not part of this encampment.

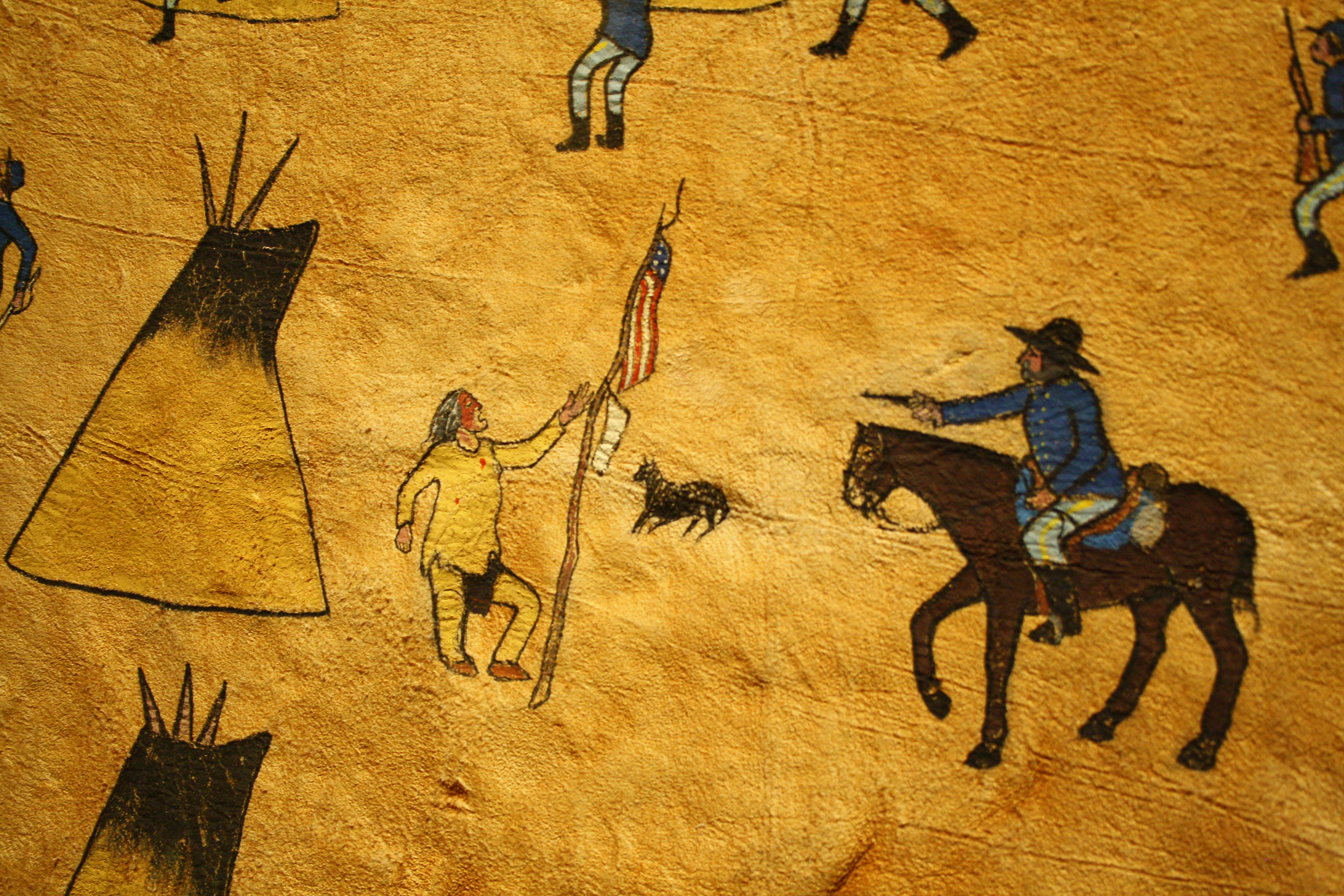
Portion of heraldic painting depicting Black Kettle at Sand Creek. (Buffalo Bill Center of the West)

Most tribal warriors stood their ground, refusing to leave their home under the guise of a threat, leaving only about 75 men, plus all the women and children in the village. The men who remained were mostly too old or too young to hunt. Black Kettle flew a U.S. flag, with a white flag tied beneath it, over his lodge, as the Fort Lyon commander had advised him. This was to show he was friendly and forestall any attack by the Colorado soldiers. Peace chief Ochinee, who tried to broker peace for the Cheyenne, was among those who were killed. Ochinee and 160 other people, most of whom were children and women, were killed.

Grandfather Ochinee (One-Eye) escaped from the camp, but seeing all that his people were to be slaughtered, he deliberately chose to go back into the one-sided battle and die with them.

— Mary Prowers Hudnal, daughter of Amache Prowers

=== Chivington attacks the camp ===
Meanwhile, Chivington and 425 men of the 3rd Colorado Cavalry rode to Fort Lyon arriving on November 28, 1864. Once at the fort, Chivington took command of 250 men of the 1st Colorado Cavalry and maybe as many as 12 men of the 1st Regiment New Mexico Volunteer Infantry, then set out for Black Kettle's encampment. James Beckwourth, a noted frontiersman who had lived with the Indians for half a century, acted as guide for Chivington. Prior to the massacre, several of Anthony's officers were not eager to join in the attack. Captain Silas Soule, Lieutenant Joseph Cramer and Lieutenant James Connor protested that attacking a peaceful camp would violate the pledge of safety provided to the Indians and would dishonor the uniform of the Army.

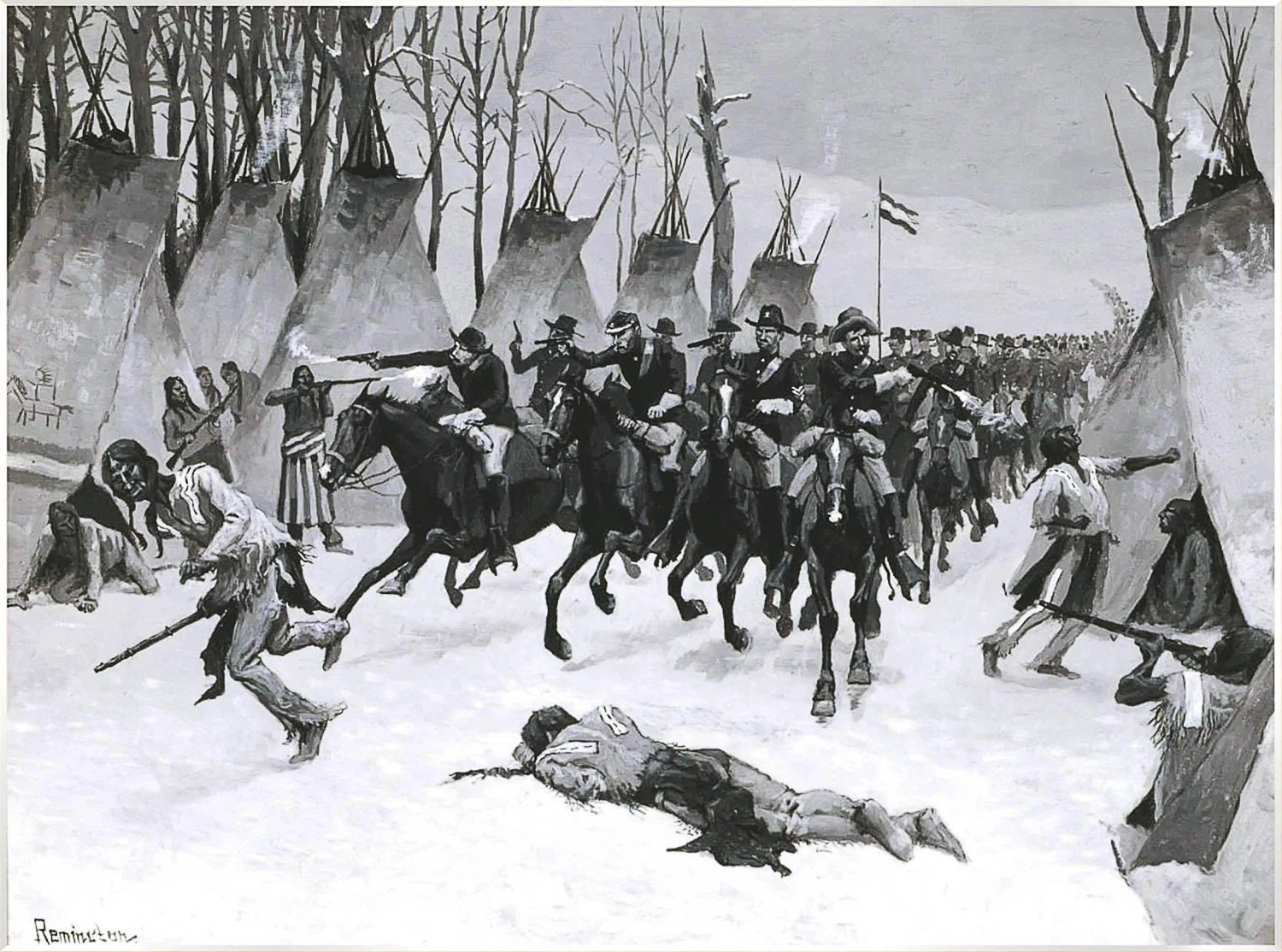
Sand Creek Massacre by Frederic Remington

The following morning, Chivington gave the order to attack. Two officers, Captain Silas Soule and Lieutenant Joseph Cramer, commanding Company D and Company K of the First Colorado Cavalry, refused to obey and told their men to hold fire. However, the rest of Chivington's men immediately attacked the village. Ignoring the U.S. flag and a white flag that was run up shortly after the attack began, they murdered as many of the Indians as they could.

I saw the bodies of those lying there cut all to pieces, worse mutilated than any I ever saw before; the women cut all to pieces ... With knives; scalped; their brains knocked out; children two or three months old; all ages lying there, from sucking infants up to warriors ... By whom were they mutilated? By the United States troops ...

— John S. Smith, Congressional Testimony of Mr. John S. Smith, 1865

I saw one squaw lying on the bank, whose leg had been broken. A soldier came up to her with a drawn sabre. She raised her arm to protect herself; he struck, breaking her arm. She rolled over, and raised her other arm; he struck, breaking that, and then left her with out killing her. I saw one squaw cut open, with an unborn child lying by her side.

— Robert Bent, New York Tribune, 1879

There was one little child, probably three years old, just big enough to walk through the sand. The Indians had gone ahead, and this little child was behind, following after them. The little fellow was perfectly naked, travelling in the sand. I saw one man get off his horse at a distance of about seventy-five yards [70 m] and draw up his rifle and fire. He missed the child. Another man came up and said, 'let me try the son of a b-. I can hit him.' He got down off his horse, kneeled down, and fired at the little child, but he missed him. A third man came up, and made a similar remark, and fired, and the little fellow dropped.

— Major Anthony, New York Tribune, 1879

Fingers and ears were cut off the bodies for the jewelry they carried. The body of White Antelope, lying solitarily in the creek bed, was a prime target. Besides scalping him the soldiers cut off his nose, ears, and testicles-the last for a tobacco pouch ...

— Stan Hoig

Jis' to think of that dog Chivington and his dirty hounds, up thar at Sand Creek. His men shot down squaws, and blew the brains out of little innocent children. You call sich soldiers Christians, do ye? And Indians savages? What der yer s'pose our Heavenly Father, who made both them and us, thinks of these things? I tell you what, I don't like a hostile red skin any more than you do. And when they are hostile, I've fought 'em, hard as any man. But I never yet drew a bead on a squaw or papoose, and I despise the man who would.

— Kit Carson to Col. James Rusling

The natives, lacking artillery, could not make much resistance. Some of the natives cut horses from the camp's herd and fled up Sand Creek or to a nearby Cheyenne camp on the headwaters of the Smoky Hill River. Others, including the half-Cheyenne, half-white trader George Bent, fled upstream and dug holes in the sand beneath the banks of the stream. They were pursued by the troops and fired on, but many survived. Cheyenne warrior Morning Star said that most of the Indian dead were killed by cannon fire, especially those firing from the south bank of the river at the people retreating up the creek.

In testimony before a Congressional committee investigating the massacre, Chivington claimed that as many as 500 to 600 Indian warriors were killed. Historian Alan Brinkley wrote that 133 Indians were killed, 105 of whom were women and children. White eyewitness John S. Smith reported that 70 to 80 Indians were killed, including 20 to 30 warriors, which agrees with Brinkley's figure as to the number of men killed. George Bent, the son of the American William Bent and a Cheyenne mother, who was in the village when the attack came and was wounded by the soldiers, gave two different accounts of the natives' loss. On March 15, 1889, he wrote to Samuel F. Tappan that 137 people were killed: 28 men and 109 women and children. However, on April 30, 1913, when he was very old, he wrote that "about 53 men" and "110 women and children" were killed and many people wounded.

Although initial reports indicated 10 soldiers killed and 38 wounded, the final tally was 4 killed and 21 wounded in the 1st Colorado Cavalry and 20 killed or mortally wounded and 31 other wounded in the 3rd Colorado Cavalry; adding up to 24 killed and 52 wounded. Dee Brown wrote that some of Chivington's men were drunk and that many of the soldiers' casualties were due to friendly fire, but neither of these claims is supported by Gregory F. Michno or Stan Hoig in their books devoted to the massacre.

Before Chivington and his men left the area, they plundered the teepees and took the horses. After the smoke cleared, Chivington's men came back and killed many of the wounded. They also scalped many of the dead, regardless of whether they were women, children, or infants. Chivington and his men dressed their weapons, hats, and gear with scalps and other body parts, including human fetuses and male and female genitalia. They also publicly displayed these battle trophies in Denver's Apollo Theater and area saloons. Three Indians who remained in the village are known to have survived the massacre: George Bent's brother Charlie Bent, and two Cheyenne women who were later turned over to William Bent.

According to western author and historian Larry McMurtry, the son of Chivington's scout John Smith (by an Indian mother) was in the camp, survived the attack and was "executed" afterward.

== Aftermath ==
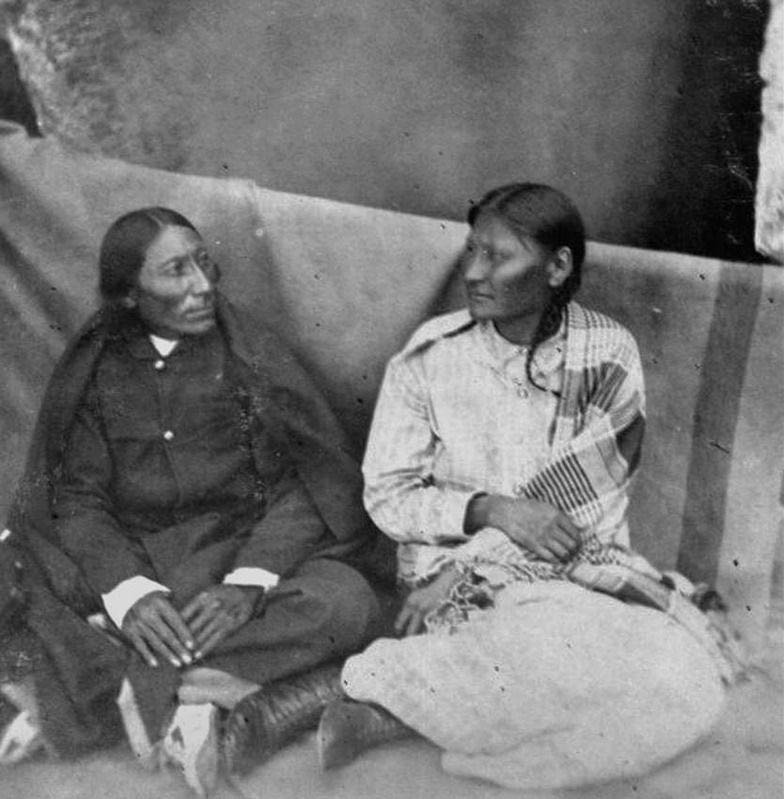
Mochi (right), a Southern Cheyenne in Black Kettle's camp, became a warrior after her experiences at the Sand Creek massacre; photographed circa 1875.

The Sand Creek Massacre resulted in a heavy loss of life, mostly among Cheyenne and Arapaho women and children. The hardest hit by the massacre were the Wutapiu, Black Kettle's band. Perhaps half of the Hevhaitaniu were lost, including the chiefs Yellow Wolf and Big Man. The Oivimana, led by War Bonnet, lost about half their number. There were heavy losses to the Hisiometanio (Ridge Men) under White Antelope. It is claimed that White Antelope was scalped in the attack. Chief One Eye was also killed, along with many of his band. The Suhtai clan and the Heviqxnipahis clan under chief Sand Hill experienced relatively few losses. The Dog Soldiers and the Masikota, who by that time had allied, were not present at Sand Creek. Of about 10 lodges of Arapaho under Chief Left Hand, representing about 50 or 60 people, only a handful escaped with their lives.

After hiding all day above the camp in holes dug beneath the bank of Sand Creek, the survivors there, many of whom were wounded, moved up the stream and spent the night on the prairie. Trips were made to the site of the camp but very few survivors were found there. After a cold night without shelter, the survivors set out toward the Cheyenne camp on the headwaters of the Smoky Hill River. They soon met up with other survivors who had escaped with part of the horse herd, some returning from the Smoky Hill camp where they had fled during the attack. They then proceeded to the camp, where they received assistance.

The massacre disrupted the traditional Cheyenne power structure, because of the deaths of eight members of the Council of Forty-Four. White Antelope, One Eye, Yellow Wolf, Big Man, Bear Man, War Bonnet, Spotted Crow, and Bear Robe were all killed, as were the headmen of some of the Cheyenne military societies. Among the chiefs killed were most of those who had advocated peace with white settlers and the U.S. government. The net effect of the murders and ensuing weakening of the peace faction exacerbated the developing social and political rift. Traditional council chiefs, mature men who sought consensus and looked to the future of their people, and their followers, were opposed by the younger and more militaristic Dog Soldiers.

Beginning in the 1830s, the Dog Soldiers had evolved from a Cheyenne military society of that name into a separate band of Cheyenne and Lakota warriors. They took as their territory the area around the headwaters of the Republican and Smoky Hill rivers in southern Nebraska, northern Kansas, and the northeastern Colorado Territory. By the 1860s, as the conflict between natives and encroaching whites intensified, the Dog Soldiers and military societies within other Cheyenne bands countered the influence of the traditional Council of Forty-Four chiefs who, as more mature men, took a larger view and were more likely to favor peace with the whites. To the Dog Soldiers, the Sand Creek massacre illustrated the folly of the peace chiefs' policy of accommodating the whites through treaties such as the first Treaty of Fort Laramie and the Treaty of Fort Wise. They believed their militant position toward the whites was justified by the massacre.

The events at Sand Creek dealt a fatal blow to the traditional Cheyenne clan system and the authority of its Council of Chiefs. It had already been weakened by the numerous deaths due to the 1849 cholera epidemic, which killed perhaps half the Southern Cheyenne population, especially the Masikota and Oktoguna bands. It was further weakened by the emergence of the separate Dog Soldiers band.

=== Retaliation ===
After the brutal slaughter of those who supported peace, many of the Cheyenne, including the great warrior Roman Nose, and many Arapaho joined the Dog Soldiers. They sought revenge on settlers throughout the Platte valley, including an 1865 attack on what became Fort Caspar, Wyoming.

Following the massacre, the survivors reached the camps of the Cheyenne on the Smokey Hill and Republican rivers. The war pipe was smoked and passed from camp to camp among the Sioux, Cheyenne, and Arapaho warriors in the area. In January 1865, they planned and carried out an attack with 1,000 warriors on the stage station and fort, then called Camp Rankin, at present-day Julesburg, Colorado. This was followed by numerous raids along the South Platte both east and west of Julesburg, and a second raid on the town of Julesburg in early February. The bulk of the Indians then moved north into Nebraska on their way to the Black Hills and the Powder River Country.

Black Kettle continued to speak for peace and did not join in the second raid or in the journey to the Powder River country. He left the camp and returned with 80 lodges to the Arkansas River to seek peace with the Coloradans.

=== Official investigations ===
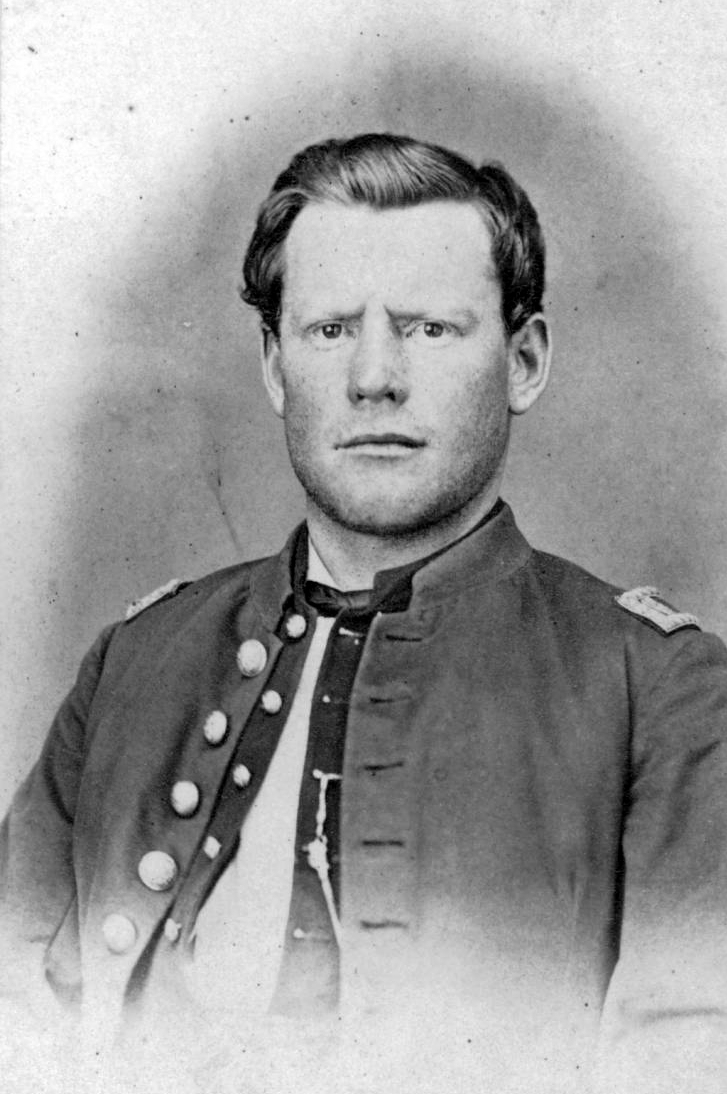
Despite threats against his life, Captain Silas Soule testified against Chivington; he was murdered soon afterwards, possibly in revenge.

Initially, the Sand Creek engagement was reported as a victory against a brave and numerous foe. Within weeks, however, witnesses and survivors began telling stories of a possible massacre. Several investigations were conducted—two by the military, and one by the Joint Committee on the Conduct of the War. The panel declared:

As to Colonel Chivington, your committee can hardly find fitting terms to describe his conduct. Wearing the uniform of the United States, which should be the emblem of justice and humanity; holding the important position of commander of a military district, and therefore having the honor of the government to that extent in his keeping, he deliberately planned and executed a foul and dastardly massacre which would have disgraced the veriest savage among those who were the victims of his cruelty. Having full knowledge of their friendly character, having himself been instrumental to some extent in placing them in their position of fancied security, he took advantage of their in-apprehension and defenceless condition to gratify the worst passions that ever cursed the heart of man. In conclusion, your committee are of the opinion that for the purpose of vindicating the cause of justice and upholding the honor of the nation, prompt and energetic measures should be at once taken to remove from office those who have thus disgraced the government by whom they are employed, and to punish, as their crimes deserve, those who have been guilty of these brutal and cowardly acts.

Statements taken by Major Edward W. Wynkoop and his adjutant substantiated the later accounts of survivors. These statements were filed with his reports and can be found in the Official Records of the War of the Rebellion, copies of which were submitted as evidence in the Joint Committee of the Conduct of the War and in separate hearings conducted by the military in Denver. Lieutenant James D. Cannon describes the mutilation of human genitalia by the soldiers, "men, women, and children's privates cut out. I heard one man say that he had cut a woman's private parts out and had them for exhibition on a stick. I heard of one instance of a child, a few months old, being thrown into the feed-box of a wagon, and after being carried some distance, left on the ground to perish; I also heard of numerous instances in which men had cut out the private parts of females and stretched them over their saddle-bows, and some of them over their hats."

During these investigations, numerous witnesses came forward with damning testimony, almost all of which was corroborated by other witnesses. Captain Silas Soule, who had ordered the men under his command not to fire their weapons, was murdered in Denver by a man under Chivington's command, just weeks after offering his testimony. Most of the questions put to Soule were about events before or after the massacre; he was not asked to testify that he refused to fight, although it is clear from his statements elsewhere that he and the men under his command chose not to participate in the massacre.

However, despite the Joint Committee on the Conduct of the Wars' recommendation, no charges were brought against those who committed the massacre. Chivington was beyond the reach of army justice because he had already resigned his commission. The closest thing to a punishment he suffered was the effective end of his political aspirations.

A monument installed on the Colorado State Capitol grounds in 1909 lists Sand Creek as one of the "battles and engagements" fought by Colorado troops in the American Civil War. In 2002, the Colorado Historical Society (now History Colorado), authorized by the Colorado General Assembly, added an additional plaque to the monument, which states that the original designers of the monument "mischaracterized" Sand Creek by calling it a battle.

=== Little Arkansas Treaty ===
After the actual details of the massacre became widely known, the United States federal government sent a blue ribbon commission whose members were respected by the Indians, and the Treaty of the Little Arkansas was signed in 1865. It promised the Indians free access to the lands south of the Arkansas River, excluded them from the Arkansas River north to the Platte River, and promised land and cash reparations to the surviving descendants of Sand Creek victims.

However, the treaty was abrogated by Washington less than two years later, all major provisions were ignored, and instead, the Medicine Lodge Treaty reduced the reservation lands by 90 percent, located in much less desirable sites in Oklahoma. Later government actions further reduced the size of the reservations.

== Remembrance ==
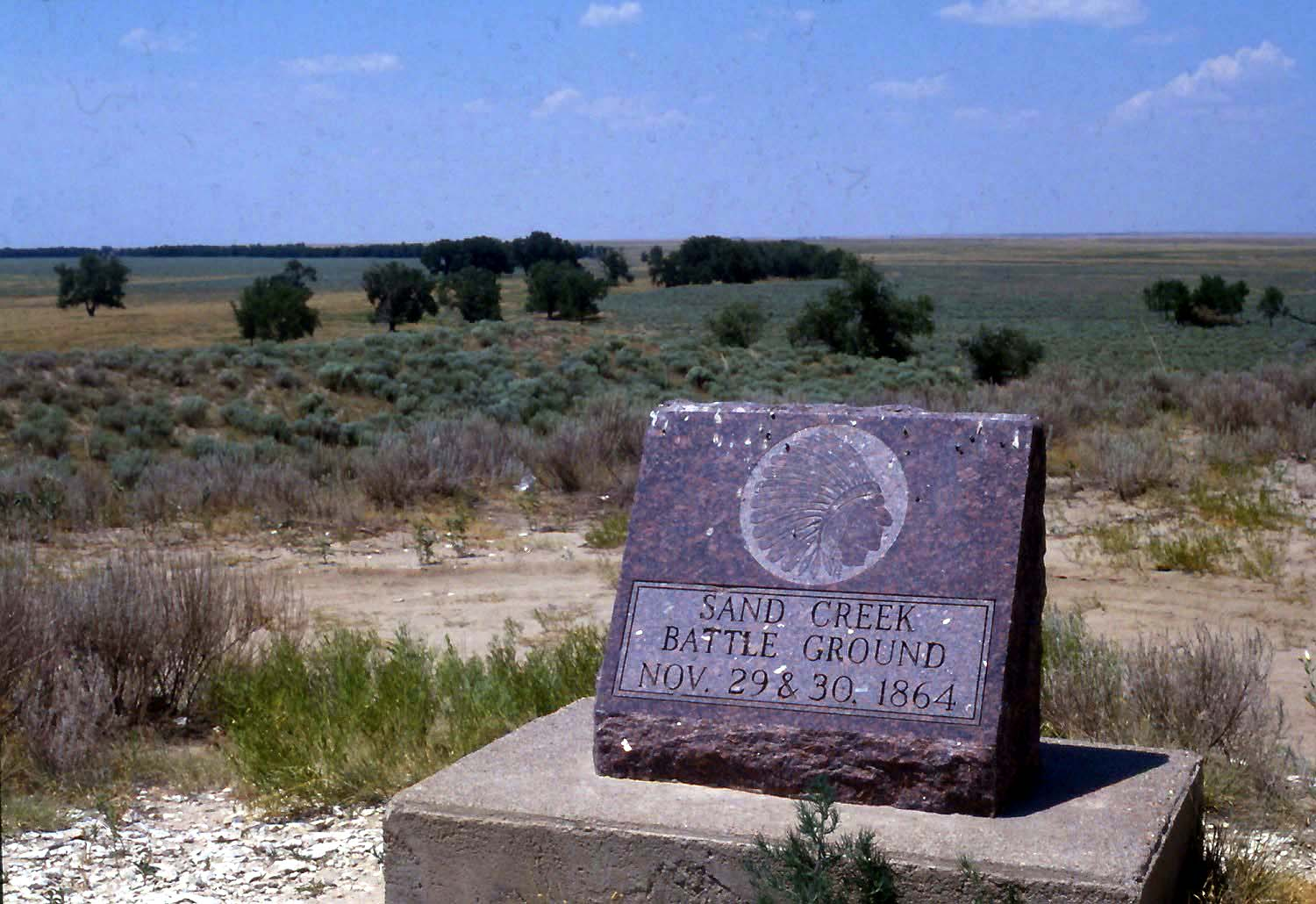
Sand Creek Battle Ground marker in 1985

Several Native families worked with museum professionals to repatriate and rebury the remains of Sand Creek Massacre victims across tribal homelands. In 1967, Anthropologists and the Nez Perce Tribe came to an agreement. The University of Idaho would rebury any remains after analyzing any graves disturbed. These remains, many of which had been taken by soldiers as war trophies or collected later by institutions, were eventually brought to a burial site in Concho, Oklahoma, where eighteen victims were reburied in a circular formation representing the shape of a tipi. As Chip Coldwell observed; "The promise of these efforts was largely eclipsed by the seeming majority of anthropologists who condemned repatriation as "scientifically indefensible." The graves were intended to become a place of remembrance and ongoing visitation for descendants, but over time the site has deteriorated due to limited resources for maintenance. Tribal representatives have noted that the condition of the graves reflects more challenges in Native communities' efforts to protect, honor, and tell the history of Sand Creek.

A site, on Big Sandy Creek in Kiowa County, is now preserved by the National Park Service. The Sand Creek Massacre National Historic Site was dedicated on April 28, 2007, almost 142 years after the massacre. The American Battlefield Trust and its partners preserved 640 acres (260 ha) of Sand Creek and deeded it to the national historic site.

The precise location of the National Park Service historic site is disputed by Chuck and Mike Bowen in their self-published book. According to National Park Service, the Indians were camped below the bluff of today's historic site and they did not see the soldiers coming. Yet no period artifacts have been found below that bluff, whereas over 4,000 artifacts have been found starting about two miles up the creek from the NPS site on private property belonging to the Bowen family. It is there where Black Kettle and the Indians were camped. According to George Bent, the Indians saw the soldiers coming from miles away. Little Bear got up early in the morning and crossed the dry creek bed to get his horse. From a high hill, he looked south toward the Fort Lyon Trail and saw approaching soldiers that looked like a long black line on the horizon, (Bent to Hyde 4-14-1906).

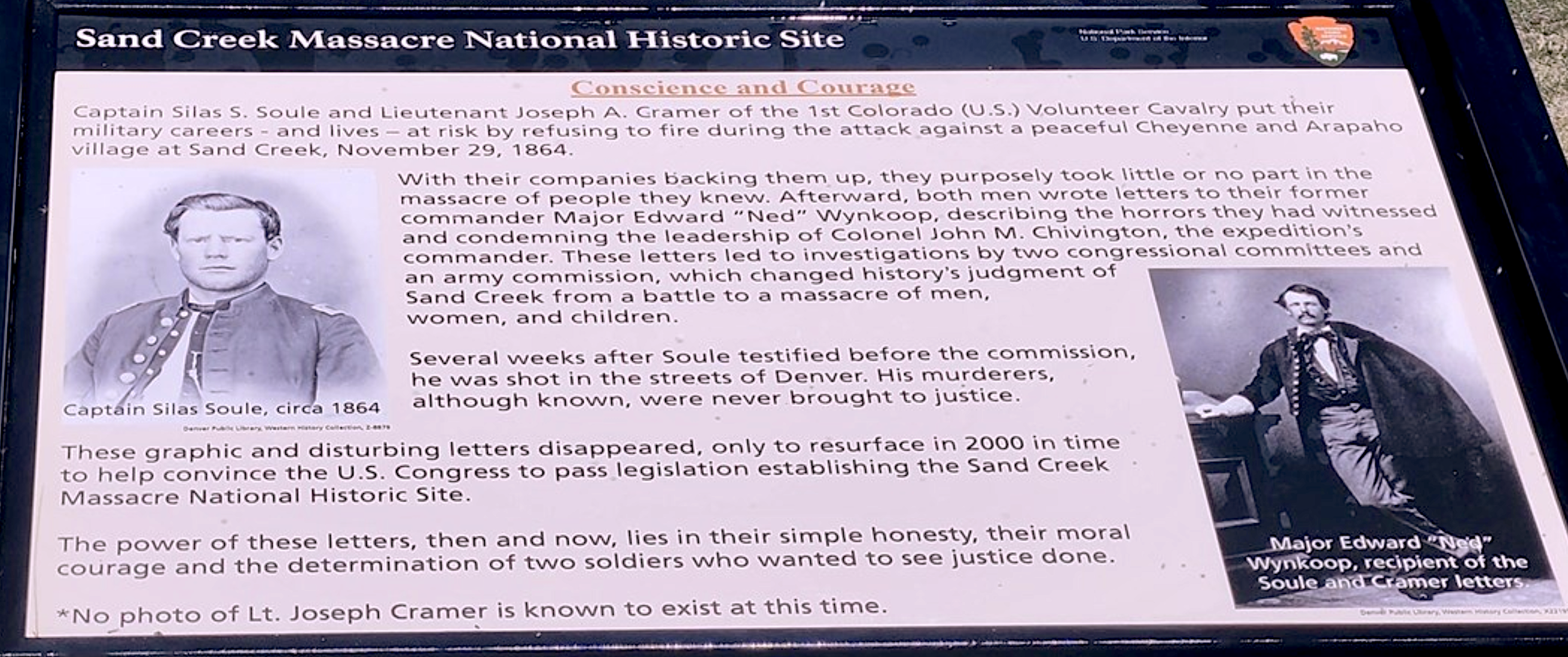
Interpretive marker at the Sand Creek Massacre National Historic site in Colorado, USA

An exhibit about Sand Creek, titled Collision: The Sand Creek Massacre 1860s–Today, opened in 2012 with the new History Colorado Center in Denver. The exhibit immediately drew criticism from members of the Northern Cheyenne tribe. In April 2013, History Colorado agreed to close the exhibit to public view while consultations were made with the Northern Cheyenne.

On December 3, 2014, Colorado Governor John Hickenlooper formally apologized to descendants of Sand Creek massacre victims gathered in Denver to commemorate the 150th anniversary of the event. Hickenlooper stated, "We should not be afraid to criticize and condemn that which is inexcusable. ... On behalf of the State of Colorado, I want to apologize. We will not run from this history."

In 2015, construction of a memorial to the Sand Creek Massacre victims began on the Colorado Capitol grounds.

In October 2022, it was announced that almost 3,500 acres (14 km^{2}) would be added to the National Historic Site to preserve for the tribes. "The Cheyenne and Arapaho Tribes are excited to see the additional 3,478 acres to the Sand Creek Massacre National Historic Site which is providing security for the protection of our Sacred site," said Cheyenne and Arapaho Tribes Governor Reggie Wassana in a statement. President Biden's Secretary of the Interior Deb Haaland announced of the preservation, "It is our solemn responsibility at the Department of the Interior, as caretakers of America's national treasures, to tell the story of our nation. The events that took place here forever changed the course of the Northern Cheyenne, Northern Arapaho, and Cheyenne and Arapaho Tribes."

== In popular culture ==
The Sand Creek massacre has been depicted or referenced in multiple works, spanning a variety of media:

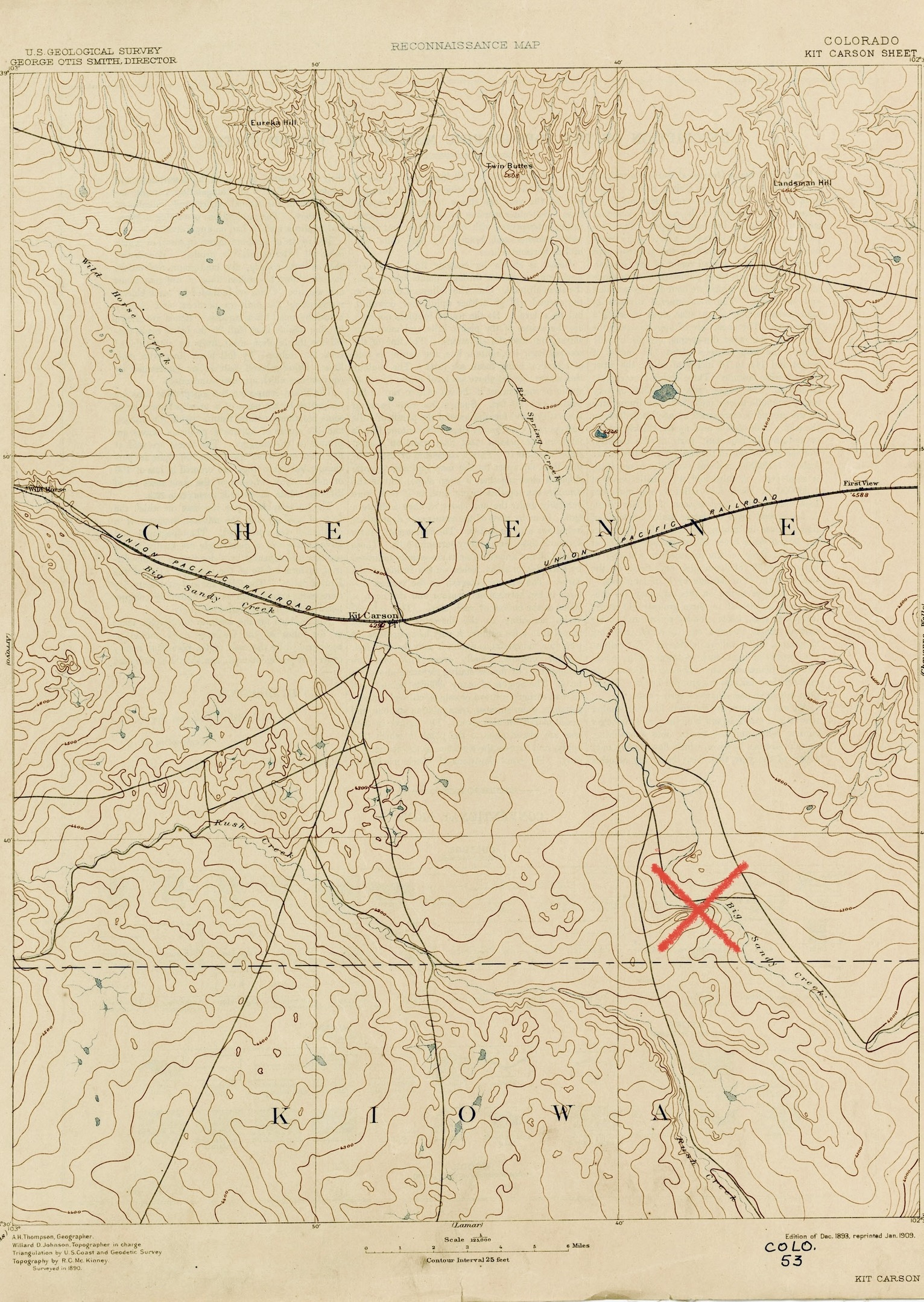
Approximate location of the 1864 Sand Creek Massacre marked on the 1890 USGS Kit Carson quadrangle topographical map; the Kit Carson station of the Kansas Pacific Railroad (later Union Pacific) opened in 1870

=== Comics ===
- Nemesis the Warlock in 2000 AD #504 (1986), depicts the massacre.
- The 30th chapter of Italian comic book saga Storia del West written by Gino D'Antonio, depicts themes of the massacre.

=== Films ===
The massacre has been portrayed in several western movies, including Tomahawk (1951), Massacre at Sand Creek (Playhouse 90) (1956), The Guns of Fort Petticoat (1957), Soldier Blue (1970), The Last Warrior (1970), Young Guns (1988), and Last of the Dogmen (1995). Little Big Man (1970), a much more famous and successful movie has an early scene of the Sand Creek Massacre. The Dustin Hoffman character saves a Cheyenne woman giving birth after watching her husband killed by the white soldiers. He then returns to his old tribe with her and takes her as his wife.

The massacre is referenced by Trevor Slattery in Iron Man 3 (2013).

=== Literature ===
- Sulle frontiere del Far-West (1909) by Emilio Salgari
- Cheyenne Autumn (1953) by Mari Sandoz
- A Very Small Remnant (1963) by Michael Straight
- Centennial (1974) by James Michener
- From Sand Creek (1981) by Simon Ortiz
- Bury My Heart at Wounded Knee (1971) by Dee Brown
- The Massacre at Sand Creek (1995) by Bruce Cutler
- Oh What a Slaughter! (2005) by Larry McMurtry
- Flight (2007) by Sherman Alexie
- Choke Creek (2009) by Lauren Small
- Young Sherlock Holmes: Fire Storm (2011) by Andrew Lane
- Piavinnia (2014) by Jo Ann Kessel
- Remembering the Sand Creek Massacre: A Historical Review of Methodist Involvement, Influence, and Response (2016), by Gary L. Roberts
- There There (2018) by Tommy Orange depicts a fictionalized version of the event
- The Minutes by Tracy Letts has a fictionalized version of the event as a key plot point
- Wandering Stars (2024) by Tommy Orange is a novel tracing intergenerational trauma and resilience that begins with the massacre.

=== Music ===
Songs about Sand Creek include Dreadzone's "Scalplock", Gila's "Black Kettle's Ballad", Five Iron Frenzy's "Banner Year", Peter La Farge's song "The Crimson Parson", Fabrizio De André's "Fiume Sand Creek", and J.D. Blackfoot's ballad "The Song of Crazy Horse" on that same-titled LP. "Psalm of Sand Creek" was another song about the massacre by the country gothic band Sons of Perdition.

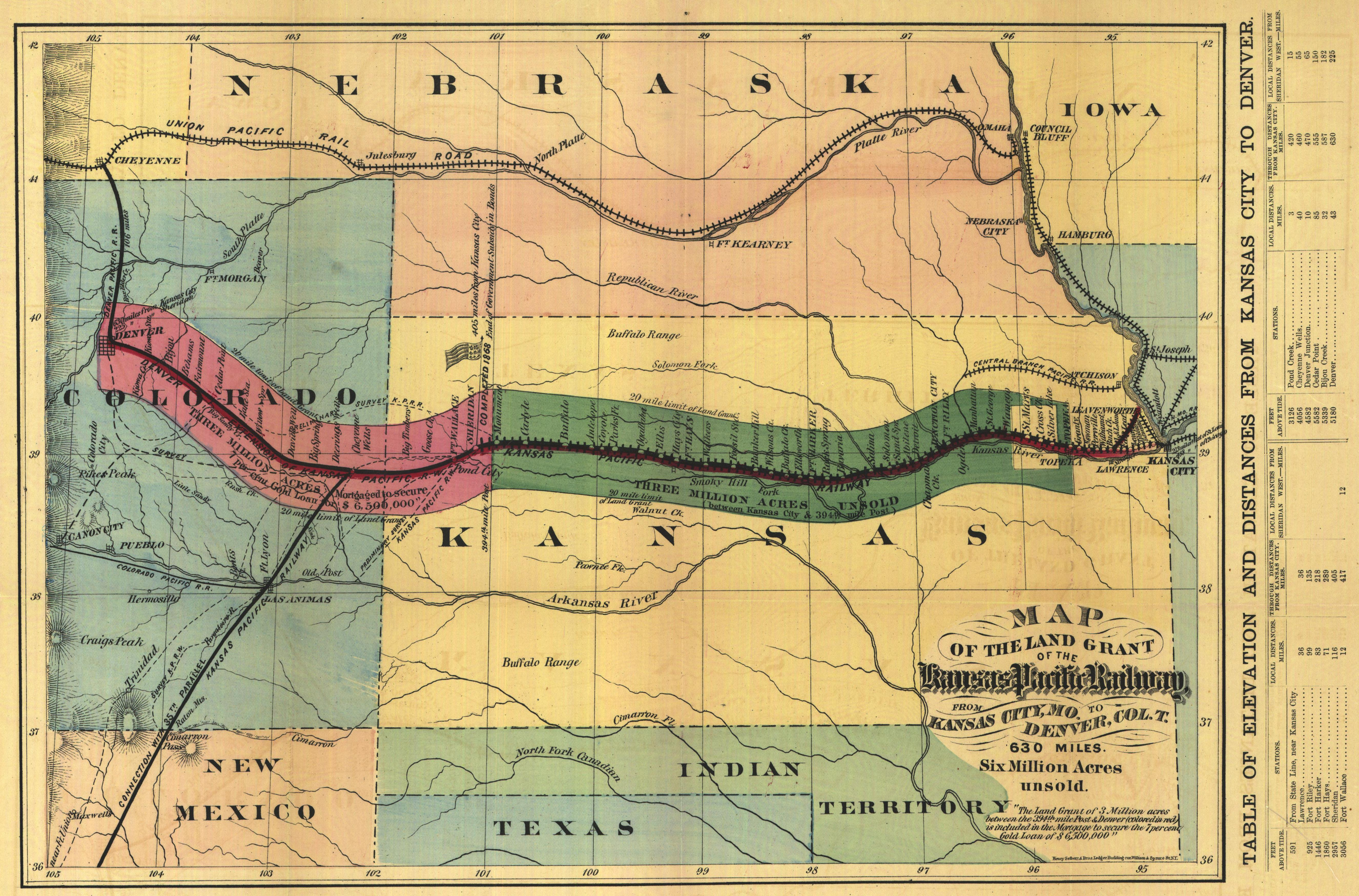
The Kansas Pacific main line shown on an 1869 map. The thickened portion along the line indicates the extent of the land grants available to settlers. At the time of the map, the line extended only as far as western Kansas (section in green). The extension to the Colorado Territory (section in red) was completed the following year; Big Sandy Creek parallels the Kansas Pacific line beginning around Kit Carson station

=== Television ===
- The Sand Creek Massacre is referenced in the "Old Jake" episode of The Life and Legend of Wyatt Earp; 1957, Season 2, Episode 31.
- The Gunsmoke episode "The Drummer", broadcast on October 9, 1972, includes descriptions and depictions of a similar incident, labeled the Rock Creek Massacre.
- The 1978 miniseries Centennial includes the Sand Creek Massacre as part of Episode 5, "The Massacre".
- The Dr. Quinn, Medicine Woman episode "A Cowboy's Lullaby", broadcast on 20 February 1993, references the Sand Creek Massacre as a reason why the local Cheyenne tribe won't adopt an infant that is half-white.
- The West (1996) (Season 1, Episode 4), depicts the Sand Creek massacre.
- The 2005 miniseries Into the West includes the Sand Creek massacre as part of Episode 4, "Hell on Wheels".

== See also ==
- List of battles fought in Colorado
- Sand Creek Massacre National Historic Site

== Bibliography ==
- Berthrong, Donald J. (1963). The Southern Cheyennes. Civilization of the American Indian. Norman, OK: University of Oklahoma Press. ISBN 978-0-8061-1199-5.
- Bowen, Chuck; Bowen, Mike (2022). We Found the Lost Sand Creek Site: Lost by an Historian's Map Found by a Soldier's Clue. Bloomington, Indiana: AuthorHouse. ISBN 978-1-6655-6155-6.
- Brown, Dee (2007) [1970]. "Chapter 4: War Comes to the Cheyennes". Bury My Heart at Wounded Knee: An Indian History of the American West. New York: H. Holt and Company. ISBN 978-0-8050-8684-3.
- Greene, Jerome A. (2004). Washita, The Southern Cheyenne and the U.S. Army. Campaigns and Commanders. Vol. 3. Norman, OK: University of Oklahoma Press. ISBN 978-0-8061-3551-9.
- Hatch, Thom (2004). Black Kettle: The Cheyenne Chief Who Sought Peace but Found War. Hoboken, NJ: John Wiley & Sons. ISBN 978-0-471-44592-0.
- Hoig, Stan (1977). The Sand Creek Massacre. Norman, OK: University of Oklahoma Press. ISBN 978-0-8061-1147-6.
- Hoig, Stan (1980). The Peace Chiefs of the Cheyennes. Norman, OK: University of Oklahoma Press. ISBN 978-0-8061-1573-3.
- Hyde, George E. (1968). Life of George Bent Written from His Letters. Ed. by Savoie Lottinville. Norman, OK: University of Oklahoma Press. ISBN 978-0-8061-1577-1.
- Jackson, Helen. (1994). A Century of Dishonor. United States: Indian Head Books. ISBN 1-56619-167-X.
- Michno, Gregory F. (2004). Battle at Sand Creek. El Segundo, CA: Upton and Sons, Publishers. ISBN 978-0-912783-37-6.
- Michno, Gregory F. (2003). Encyclopedia of Indian Wars: Western Battles and Skirmishes 1850–1890. Missoula, MT: Mountain Press Publishing Company. ISBN 978-0-87842-468-9.
- Official Records of the War of the Rebellion.
- "Treaty of Fort Laramie with Sioux, Etc., 1851." 11 Stats. 749, Sept. 17, 1851. In Charles J. Kappler, compiler and editor, Indian Affairs: Laws and Treaties – Vol. II: Treaties. Washington, D.C.: Government Printing Office, 1904, pp. 594–596. Through Oklahoma State University Library, Electronic Publishing Center.
- "Treaty with the Arapaho and Cheyenne, 1861" (Treaty of Fort Wise). 12 Stat. 1163, Feb. 15, 1861. Ratified Aug. 6, 1861; proclaimed Dec. 5, 1861. In Charles J. Kappler, compiler and editor, Indian Affairs: Laws and Treaties – Vol. II: Treaties. Washington, D.C.: Government Printing Office, 1904, pp. 807–811. Through Oklahoma State University Library, Electronic Publishing Center.
- United States Army. (1867). Courts of Inquiry, Sand Creek Massacre. Report of the Secretary of War Communicating, In Compliance With a Resolution of the Senate of February 4, 1867, a Copy of the Evidence Taken at Denver and Fort Lyon, Colorado Territory, By a Military Commission, Ordered to Inquire into the Sand Creek Massacre, November, 1864. Washington, DC: Government Printing Office. Senate Executive Document 26, 39th Congress, Second Session. Reproduced in Wynkoop, Christopher H. (2004-08-13). "Inquiry into the Sand Creek Massacre, November, 1864." The Wynkoop Family Research Library. Rootsweb.com: Freepages. Retrieved on 2007-04-29.
- United States Congress. (1867). Condition of the Indian Tribes. Report of the Joint Special Committee Appointed Under Joint Resolution of March 3, 1865, with an Appendix. Washington, DC: Government Printing Office.
- United States Senate. (1865). "Massacre of the Cheyenne Indians". Report of the Joint Committee on The Conduct of the War. (3 vols.) Senate Report No. 142, 38th Congress, Second Session. Washington, DC: Government Printing Office. pp. I–VI, 3–108
- West, Elliott (1998). The Contested Plains: Indians, Goldseekers, and the Rush to Colorado. University Press of Kansas. ISBN 978-0-7006-1029-7.
- Winger, Kevin (August 17, 2007). "Trail Helps Mark 1864 Massacre". Cheyenne Wyoming Tribune-Eagle.
- Colwell, Chip. Plundered Skulls and Stolen Spirits: Inside the Fight to Reclaim Native America’s Culture. Chicago: University of Chicago Press, 2017.
