= Ash Creek Township, Kansas =

Ash Creek Township
- Township
- Location in Ellsworth County
- Coordinates: 38°39′10″N 098°12′07″W
- Country: United States
- State: Kansas
- County: Ellsworth

Area
  - Total: 36.02 sq mi (93.29 km^{2})
  - Land: 35.84 sq mi (92.82 km^{2})
  - Water: 0.18 sq mi (0.47 km^{2}) 0.5%
- Elevation: 1,621 ft (494 m)

Population (2020)
  - Total: 47
  - Density: 1.3/sq mi (0.51/km^{2})
- GNIS feature ID: 0475455

Ash Creek Township is a township in Ellsworth County, Kansas, United States. As of the 2020 census, its population was 47.

== Geography ==
Ash Creek Township covers an area of 36.02 square miles (93.3 km^{2}) and contains no incorporated settlements.

The streams of Ash Creek and Mud Creek run through this township.
