= Emmett Louis Murphy =

American lawyer

Emmett Louis Murphy (May 30, 1897 in Colon, Nebraska – June 8, 1970 in Omaha, Nebraska) was an attorney and civic leader from Omaha, Nebraska. He served as assistant attorney general from 1937 to 1945, was federal bankruptcy referee from 1950 to 1962, and was on the board of directors of the National Association of Referees in Bankruptcy from 1957 to 1962. He was the governor of the Nebraska-Iowa district of the Kiwanis club in 1948 and vice-president of Omaha Catholic Charities in 1949 and 1950.

== Personal life ==
Murphy was born in Colon, Nebraska, on 30 May 1897 to John Murphy (born in Kilkenny, Ireland) and Mary Delaney (a first generation Irish-American born in Pennsylvania). He was reared on his father's Saunders County, Nebraska, farm and attended high school at Cedar Bluffs as a part of a class of 5 (all 5 would attend their 50th anniversary many years later along with the school's faculty of 2). Cedar Bluffs had only 11 grades, so he attended 12th grade at Creighton Prep in Omaha. In July 1918 he shipped off to the Great Lakes Naval Training Station to serve in the United States Navy in World War I after 3 years at Creighton University. He never went abroad and returned home Christmas Day that year. On 14 October 1919 he married Georgia Adams, daughter of Clarence Ellsworth Adams and Bertie May Swigert. After the war, he spent two years practicing law in Falls City, Nebraska, before coming to Omaha to work as a lawyer in 1921.

He lived most of his life at 2718 Reed Street in the Minne Lusa neighborhood. His father lived on his farm near Norfolk while Georgia's parents lived at 4216 Fowler near 42nd and Ames Street. He was described as a soft-spoken man with grey hair in a profile in 1959.

== Social and civic life ==
Much of his social life involved his membership in civic and charitable organizations, although there was one interesting report about his musical taste. Julius K. Johnson, the pianist who performed the soundtrack of the 1925 movie, "The Wizard of Oz" (not the more famous 1939 version) and who wrote the Boy Scout Parade March was originally from Omaha. In September 1931, he was hosted by Dr. John A. Tamislea at a local theater in a "stag party". Murphy was a guest along with George Mascott, August Herman, Frank Hodek, Billy Meyers, Chester Heyn, Dr. E. H. Wilson, and Henry G. Lee.

In 1938 he joined a Catholic Charities legal aid bureau in Omaha organized by Catholic Charities director Rev. James J. Morrin under a committee of Paul L Martin, Edith Beckman, Charles Bongardt, William P Lynch, and L J Te Poel. In 1949, he was installed as vice-president of Catholic Charities in Omaha by president Archbishop Gerald Thomas Bergan, and was reelected a year later.

He was very involved in the Kiwanis club. In 1943 he was president of North Omaha Kiwanas district and was elected Lieutenant Governor of division 4 of the Iowa-Nebraska district of Kiwanis in 1944. In 1947 was elected district governor of the Iowa-Nebraska district of Kiwanis and served until 1948. He installed his son, John, as president of North Omaha Kiwanis club in 1958.

He was also keenly interested in education. In 1942 he was a part of the school crisis committee seeking to increase school funding. He served as vice president of the Minne Lusa Elementary school PTA in 1940 and was in the Omaha North High School PTA in 1951.

His opposition to a bill seeking to control what kinds of sale prices may be advertised was cited in the Nebraska Unicameral John Adams, Jr, a lawyer and one of Nebraska's first African-American state congressman.

=== World War II ===
His political involvement was indicative of a strong sense of patriotism, and in 1942 he registered for World War II draft with his son, Mel (both of his sons, Melvin and John, served in the war. During the war, he was tasked with the prosecution of draft dodgers in the region. He was invited to speak at the April 5, 1943, sendoff of troops selected by draft board No. 3 in the Red Cross canteen at the Omaha YMCA. He was also co-chair of a project by the North Omaha Kiwanis club to provide fresh fruit on all World War II hospital trains passing through town.

== Legal career ==
He announced that he opened a law office with Clair M. Roddewig at 418–19 Union State Bank Building in downtown Omaha at 19th and Farnam in April 1930. Roddewig graduated from Creighton in the 1920s and went on to become the Attorney General of South Dakota, General Counsel of the Office of Defense Mobilization, was a Delegate to 1964 Democratic National Convention from Illinois, was acting president of the Chicago School Board from 1962 to 1964, and was vice-chairman of the board of Mutual of Omaha upon his death in 1975.

=== Candidate for municipal court judge ===
The first evidence of his personal politics appeared in 1936 when he ran for a position as municipal court judge. He spoke in his candidacy in support of reform of police court conduct and procedure. To that point, police court gave only very little time to each case and allowed very unruly behavior, which Murphy and others claimed resulted in many who were being tried for drunken driving not being adequately prosecuted and escaping without punishment. He was also one of the candidates who voiced strong opposition to Senate File 160, known as the Foreign Language Bill, which would make illegal the teaching in "private, denominational, parochial, or public schools" of any subject in any language other than English, stating in a speech, "I fought that vicious foreign language bill" ". He ran 12th in the primary where only 10 would advance to the general election. Although two of the 12 subsequently dropped out, his request to be added to the definition was denied.

=== Assistant to the Omaha Attorney General ===
However his public stature was quite grown, and in February 1937 he was notified that he would be accepted as assistant to the District Attorney in Omaha as a replacement of Fred Q. Hawxby with approval of the US congress. He was to serve U.S. District Attorney Joseph T. Votava along with fellow assistant A. C. Epperson. In this position, many of his cases were heard by Judge James A. Donohoe and worked with clerk R. C. Hoyt.

Neighboring state Kansas remained dry after the repeal of prohibition in 1933, and controls on alcohol continued in Omaha. Thus much of Murphy's work involved prosecuting people seeking to transport alcohol into Kansas or illicitly produce alcohol. In 1938 he prosecuted an interesting case against Lester Morehouse who ran an illegal still on a river island or east of Fort Calhoun, Nebraska. Murphy prosecuted the case and followed up in the US circuit court of appeals where Morehouse's representation claimed the island was not in Nebraska, and the court upheld the conviction.

He remained involved with politics, campaigning in his home neighborhood of Florence on behalf of Democratic House of Representatives reelection of Charles F. McLaughlin in 1938. McLaughlin won, and remained the representative until 1943 (succeeded by Howard H. Buffet). Murphy frequently traveled to Grand Island, Nebraska, for his work. In 1938 he took part in a trail which convicted Arthur E Collins and sent him to 15 years in prison in Alcatraz. When Collins field a habeas corpus complaint in 1939, Murphy went to California to receive a deposition from Federal District Judge Thomas Charles Munger in Collins complaint against warden of the Alcatraz Federal Penitentiary, James A. Johnston. In a case he cited as his most memorable when he resigned as assistant district attorney in 1945, Murphy was the lead prosecution in the successful trial of the First Mortgage Acceptance Corporation head L C "safety Sam" Holmes for fraud, the group selling over a million dollars in participation certificates in mortgages which the prosecution claimed were worthless.

In March 1945 his fellow assistant DA, William H. Meier was replaced by Warren C. Schrempp, and he himself resigned in August 1945 to be succeeded by Anthony Z. Donato. However, he continued to work for the district attorney, and in 1946, was again working in Votava's office as a special attorney for the lands division of the district attorney.

In his legal work, he frequently supported immigrants. Along with his early opposition to the Foreign Language Bill, he supported immigrants in cases to halt deportation, such as the cases of Felipe Torres in 1948 and of John Trovato in 1945.

In 1949 was appointed by the mayor to the appeal board succeeding John P Mainelli but he resigned in 1950, succeeded by Sam E. Klaver. This served as a bookend to this part of his legal career.

=== Federal bankruptcy referee ===
In 1950 he was installed as federal bankruptcy referee and was elected as director for the local district (Eighth Circuit) of the National Association of Referees in Bankruptcy in 1957.

One of the largest cases Murphy had as bankruptcy referee was that of G&S Red Stamp Company which had about $200,000 in debts against $15,000 in assets. Another large case was that of the Fields Corporation which owned 5 hotels in Nebraska: The Lincoln and Capital in Lincoln, the Madison at Norfolk, Evans at Columbus, and the Lincoln at Scottsbluff. Other hotels in Iowa and Missouri were adjudicated by referees in those states. The case was resolved when Sheraton Hotels purchased these and the six other hotels in Iowa and Missouri, accepting the debt of $1,235,000 and paying out $20,000 to the trustee and pay interest and taxes.

He retired from his position as Federal Bankruptcy Referee in 1962. In the last six months of work, there were 387 cases filed.

== Family and legacy ==
He married Georgia Adams in 1919 and celebrated his 50th anniversary at Caniglia's restaurant in 1969, a year before his death on 8 June 1970.

He was survived by his wife, Georgia, his sons District Court Judge John E and Lt. Col. Melvin, daughters Mary Mea (m. William Collamer), Joan (m. Richard Hill), and Marguerite (m. Dennis Murphy) of Omaha. Also his sisters Mrs. Mabel Kraus and Mrs. Genevieve Shanahan of Omaha, Mrs. Theresa Shanahan of Fremont, brothers Edward and Francis of Omaha, John of Fremont, and Albert of Cedar Bluffs. He was remembered a "having a brilliant legal career, being a strong supporter of education, both public and parochial, and quietly assisting many young people who needed help".
