= Nebraska Highway 109 =

State highway in Nebraska, U.S.

State Highway 109

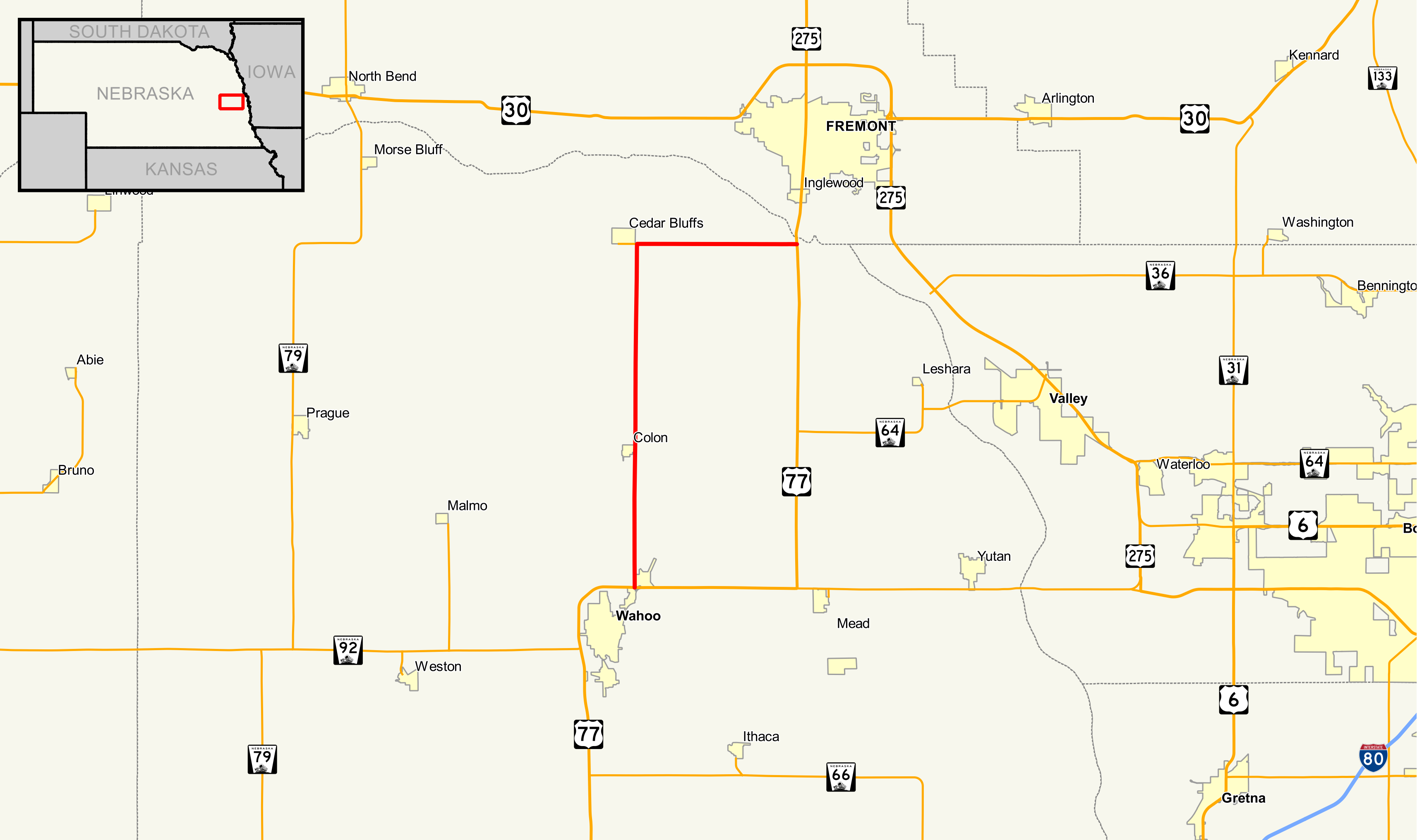
- Nebraska Highway 109 highlighted in red

Route information
- Maintained by NDOT
- Length: 16.07 mi (25.86 km)
- Existed: 1935–present

Major junctions
- South end: US 77 / N-92 in Wahoo
- North end: US 77 south of Fremont

Location
- Country: United States
- State: Nebraska
- Counties: Saunders

Highway system
- Nebraska State Highway System; Interstate; US; State; Link; Spur; State Spurs; Recreation
← N-105	→ N-110

Nebraska Highway 109 is a highway in eastern Nebraska. Its southern terminus is at U.S. Highway 77 and Nebraska Highway 92 at Wahoo, Nebraska. Its northern terminus is at U.S. Highway 77 near Fremont, Nebraska.

== Route description ==
The route goes north from its intersection with US 77 and NE 92 and heads into farmland, passing through Colon. At Cedar Bluffs, NE 109 meets Nebraska Spur 78H and turns east. It continues east until ending at US 77 south of Fremont.

== Major intersections ==
The entire route is in Saunders County.

Location	mi	km	Destinations	Notes
Wahoo	0.00	0.00	US 77 / N-92	Southern terminus
Cedar Bluffs	10.96	17.64	S-78H west (Road X)	
	16.07	25.86	US 77	Northern terminus
1.000 mi = 1.609 km; 1.000 km = 0.621 mi
