= Center Township, Saunders County, Nebraska =

Center Township
- Township
- Location in Saunders County
- Coordinates: 41°15′56″N 096°37′08″W
- Country: United States
- State: Nebraska
- County: Saunders

Area
  - Total: 35.45 sq mi (91.81 km^{2})
  - Land: 35.41 sq mi (91.72 km^{2})
  - Water: 0.035 sq mi (0.09 km^{2}) 0.1%
- Elevation: 1,211 ft (369 m)

Population (2020)
  - Total: 741
  - Density: 20.9/sq mi (8.08/km^{2})
- GNIS feature ID: 0837910

Center Township is one of twenty-four townships in Saunders County, Nebraska, United States. The population was 741 at the 2020 census. A 2021 estimate placed the township's population at 764.

The Village of Colon lies within the Township.

== See also ==
- County government in Nebraska
