= Ashland Township =

Ashland Township may refer to:

- Ashland Township, Cass County, Illinois
- Ashland Township, Morgan County, Indiana
- Ashland Township, Michigan
- Ashland Township, Dodge County, Minnesota
- Ashland Township, Saunders County, Nebraska
- Ashland Township, Pennsylvania
