= Trostville, Wisconsin =

Coordinates: 43°04′04″N 87°59′09″W

Trostville (also called Trost Corner or Trost's Corner) was a rural hamlet and post office address around the junction of Lisbon Plank Road (now Lisbon Avenue), South Fond du Lac Avenue (now Appleton Avenue), and Center Street, in Sections 14 and 15 of what was then the Town of Wauwatosa in Milwaukee County, Wisconsin, United States in the late 19th and very early 20th century. It was the site of a post office from 1892–1898.; as of 1895–1898, the post office was serviced three times a week. The postmaster was John Trost.

Trostville continued to be shown on a 1903 map (as "Trost's Corner"), but is now part of the City of Milwaukee.
