= Chester Township, Saunders County, Nebraska =

Chester Township
- Township
- Location in Saunders County
- Coordinates: 41°20′27″N 096°50′59″W
- Country: United States
- State: Nebraska
- County: Saunders

Area
  - Total: 29.81 sq mi (77.22 km^{2})
  - Land: 29.61 sq mi (76.69 km^{2})
  - Water: 0.20 sq mi (0.53 km^{2}) 0.69%
- Elevation: 1,463 ft (446 m)

Population (2020)
  - Total: 380
  - Density: 13/sq mi (5.0/km^{2})
- GNIS feature ID: 0837919

Chester Township is one of twenty-four townships in Saunders County, Nebraska, United States. The population was 380 at the 2020 census. A 2021 estimate placed the township's population at 385.

Most of the Village of Prague lies within the Township.

== See also ==
- County government in Nebraska
