= Mariposa Township, Saunders County, Nebraska =

Mariposa Township
- Township
- Location in Saunders County
- Coordinates: 41°15′49″N 096°44′11″W
- Country: United States
- State: Nebraska
- County: Saunders

Area
  - Total: 35.98 sq mi (93.18 km^{2})
  - Land: 35.93 sq mi (93.05 km^{2})
  - Water: 0.050 sq mi (0.13 km^{2}) 0.14%
- Elevation: 1,237 ft (377 m)

Population (2020)
  - Total: 377
  - Density: 10.5/sq mi (4.05/km^{2})
- GNIS feature ID: 0838129

Mariposa Township is one of twenty-four townships in Saunders County, Nebraska, United States. The population was 377 at the 2020 census. A 2021 estimate placed the township's population at 386.

The Village of Malmo lies within the Township.

== See also ==
- County government in Nebraska
