= Stocking Township, Saunders County, Nebraska =

Stocking Township
- Township
- Location in Saunders County
- Coordinates: 41°10′29″N 096°37′02″W
- Country: United States
- State: Nebraska
- County: Saunders

Area
  - Total: 34.46 sq mi (89.24 km^{2})
  - Land: 34.4 sq mi (89.2 km^{2})
  - Water: 0.015 sq mi (0.04 km^{2}) 0.04%
- Elevation: 1,217 ft (371 m)

Population (2020)
  - Total: 460
  - Density: 13/sq mi (5.2/km^{2})
- GNIS feature ID: 0838273

Stocking Township is one of twenty-four townships in Saunders County, Nebraska, United States. The population was 460 at the 2020 census. A 2021 estimate placed the township's population at 471.

== See also ==
- County government in Nebraska
