= Marble Township, Saunders County, Nebraska =

Marble Township
- Township
- Location in Saunders County
- Coordinates: 41°10′15″N 096°23′48″W
- Country: United States
- State: Nebraska
- County: Saunders

Area
  - Total: 42.17 sq mi (109.21 km^{2})
  - Land: 41.34 sq mi (107.07 km^{2})
  - Water: 0.83 sq mi (2.14 km^{2}) 1.96%
- Elevation: 1,142 ft (348 m)

Population (2020)
  - Total: 454
  - Density: 11.0/sq mi (4.24/km^{2})
- GNIS feature ID: 0838126

Marble Township is one of twenty-four townships in Saunders County, Nebraska, United States. The population was 454 at the 2020 census. A 2021 estimate placed the township's population at 465.

== See also ==
- County government in Nebraska
