= South Cedar Township, Saunders County, Nebraska =

South Cedar Township
- Township
- Location in Saunders County
- Coordinates: 41°20′38″N 096°36′58″W
- Country: United States
- State: Nebraska
- County: Saunders

Area
  - Total: 29.9 sq mi (77.4 km^{2})
  - Land: 29.9 sq mi (77.4 km^{2})
  - Water: 0 sq mi (0 km^{2}) 0%
- Elevation: 1,270 ft (387 m)

Population (2020)
  - Total: 240
  - Density: 8.0/sq mi (3.1/km^{2})
- GNIS feature ID: 0838259

South Cedar Township is one of 24 townships in Saunders County, in the U.S. state of Nebraska. The population was 240 at the 2020 census. A 2021 estimate placed the township's population at 247.

== See also ==
- County government in Nebraska
