= North Cedar Township, Saunders County, Nebraska =

North Cedar Township
- Township
- Location in Saunders County
- Coordinates: 41°24′16″N 096°36′49″W
- Country: United States
- State: Nebraska
- County: Saunders

Area
  - Total: 22.10 sq mi (57.24 km^{2})
  - Land: 21.78 sq mi (56.41 km^{2})
  - Water: 0.32 sq mi (0.84 km^{2}) 1.47%
- Elevation: 1,299 ft (396 m)

Population (2020)
  - Total: 797
  - Density: 36.6/sq mi (14.1/km^{2})
- GNIS feature ID: 0838162

North Cedar Township is one of twenty-four townships in Saunders County, Nebraska, United States. The population was 797 at the 2020 census. A 2021 estimate placed the township's population at 806.

The Village of Cedar Bluffs lies within the Township.

== See also ==
- County government in Nebraska
