= Malmo, Nebraska =

Village in Saunders County, Nebraska, United States

- Village
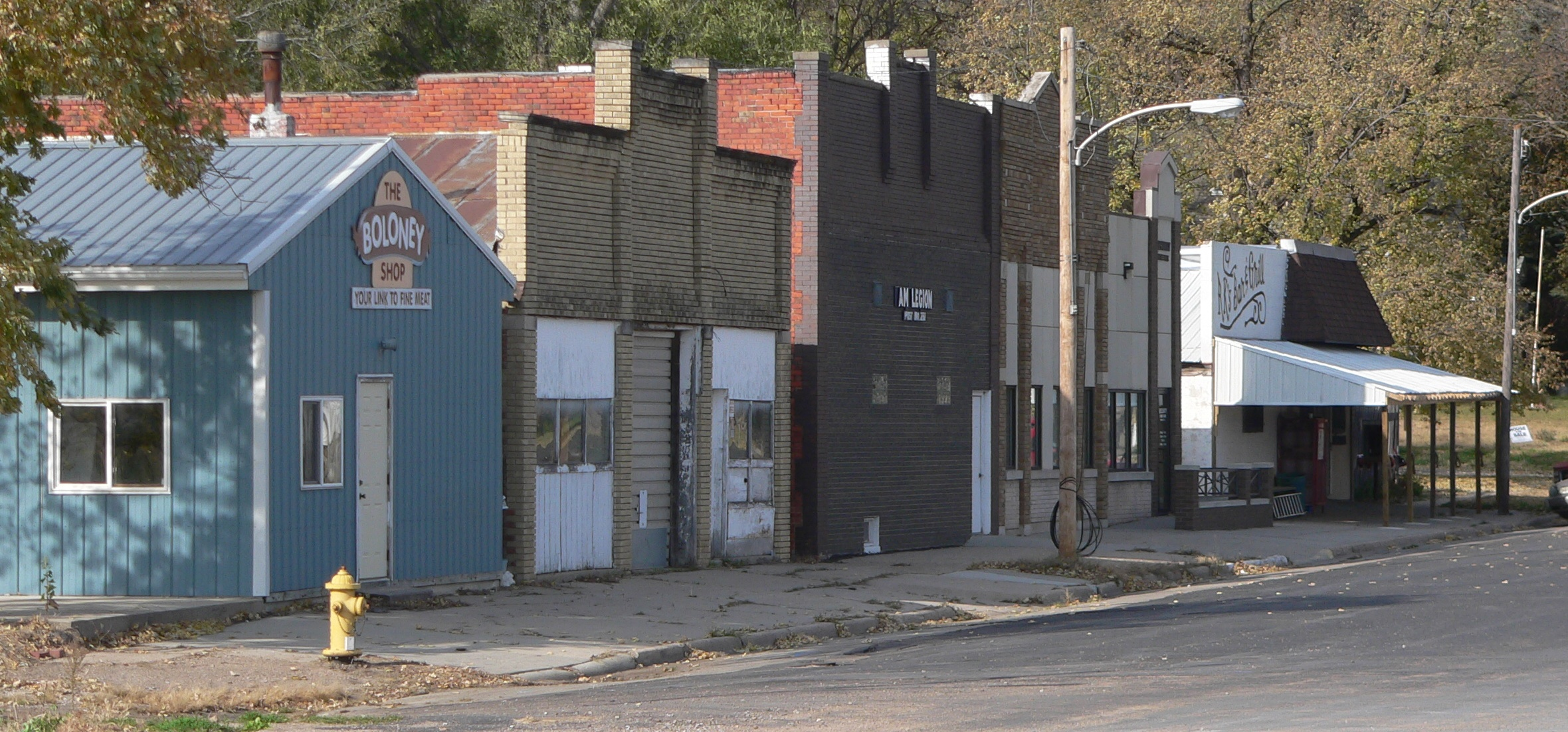
- Downtown Malmo, October 2011

- Location of Malmo, Nebraska

- Location within Nebraska Location within the United States
- Coordinates: 41°15′59″N 96°43′15″W
- Country: United States
- State: Nebraska
- County: Saunders
- Township: Mariposa

Area
  - Total: 0.14 sq mi (0.35 km^{2})
  - Land: 0.14 sq mi (0.35 km^{2})
  - Water: 0 sq mi (0.00 km^{2})
- Elevation: 1,260 ft (380 m)

Population (2020)
  - Total: 94
  - Density: 690.2/sq mi (266.49/km^{2})
- Time zone: UTC-6 (Central (CST))
  - Summer (DST): UTC-5 (CDT)
- ZIP code: 68040
- Area code: 402
- FIPS code: 31-30380
- GNIS feature ID: 2399232

Malmo is a village in Saunders County, Nebraska, United States. The population was 94 at the 2020 census.

== History ==
Malmo was platted in 1887 when the railroad was extended to that point. A majority of the early settlers being natives of Sweden caused the name Malmo, after the Swedish city of Malmö, to be selected. Malmo was incorporated as a village in 1893.

== Geography ==
According to the United States Census Bureau, the village has a total area of 0.14 square miles (0.36 km^{2}), all land.

== Demographics ==
Historical population
Census	Pop.	Note	%±
1900	259		—
1910	214		−17.4%
1920	189		−11.7%
1930	179		−5.3%
1940	167		−6.7%
1950	151		−9.6%
1960	135		−10.6%
1970	131		−3.0%
1980	100		−23.7%
1990	114		14.0%
2000	109		−4.4%
2010	120		10.1%
2020	94		−21.7%
U.S. Decennial Census

=== 2010 census ===
As of the census of 2010, there were 120 people, 47 households, and 33 families living in the village. The population density was 857.1 inhabitants per square mile (330.9/km^{2}). There were 57 housing units at an average density of 407.1 per square mile (157.2/km^{2}). The racial makeup of the village was 100.0% White.

There were 47 households, of which 31.9% had children under the age of 18 living with them, 61.7% were married couples living together, 2.1% had a female householder with no husband present, 6.4% had a male householder with no wife present, and 29.8% were non-families. 25.5% of all households were made up of individuals, and 12.8% had someone living alone who was 65 years of age or older. The average household size was 2.55 and the average family size was 3.03.

The median age in the village was 37.3 years. 27.5% of residents were under the age of 18; 7.4% were between the ages of 18 and 24; 28.4% were from 25 to 44; 24.2% were from 45 to 64; and 12.5% were 65 years of age or older. The gender makeup of the village was 49.2% male and 50.8% female.

=== 2000 census ===
As of the census of 2000, there were 109 people, 42 households, and 27 families living in the village. The population density was 801.0 inhabitants per square mile (309.3/km^{2}). There were 53 housing units at an average density of 389.5 per square mile (150.4/km^{2}). The racial makeup of the village was 98.17% White and 1.83% Asian. Hispanic or Latino of any race were 0.92% of the population.

There were 42 households, out of which 33.3% had children under the age of 18 living with them, 57.1% were married couples living together, 2.4% had a female householder with no husband present, and 35.7% were non-families. 31.0% of all households were made up of individuals, and 16.7% had someone living alone who was 65 years of age or older. The average household size was 2.60 and the average family size was 3.37.

In the village, the population was spread out, with 33.9% under the age of 18, 3.7% from 18 to 24, 31.2% from 25 to 44, 12.8% from 45 to 64, and 18.3% who were 65 years of age or older. The median age was 34 years. For every 100 females, there were 98.2 males. For every 100 females age 18 and over, there were 94.6 males.

As of 2000 the median income for a household in the village was $33,125, and the median income for a family was $40,000. Males had a median income of $28,750 versus $19,750 for females. The per capita income for the village was $15,383. There were 3.1% of families and 5.4% of the population living below the poverty line, including 14.7% of under eighteens and none of those over 64.

== See also ==
- List of municipalities in Nebraska
