= John Ellsworth Murphy =

American lawyer

John Ellsworth Murphy (October 27, 1925 Omaha, Nebraska – November 12, 1984, Omaha Nebraska) was a lawyer and judge in Omaha, Nebraska. From 1960 to 1978 he served as a judge on the district 8 court of Nebraska. The most notable cases over which he presided were the bribery cases against then Mayor James Dworak and four others and a murder case against Robert Julian Jacobs. Also, he was the judge who heard the first part of the legal battle that occurred when Omaha annexed the town of Millard in the late 1960s and early 1970s.

== Personal and civic life ==
Murphy was the son of Emmett and Georgia (Adams). Murphy served as a private first class in the US Army during World War II, receiving in July 1945 a bronze star for meritorious service from February 20, 1945, to April 26, 1945, in France and Germany. Two years later, in December 1947, he became engaged to his soon to be wife, Mary Beth Hill (b. December 17, 1922, in Omaha), daughter of Lloyd Miller Hill (b. June 13, 1869, in Wisconsin) and Cecilia Sinnett (b. March 5, 1899), whom he married on September 4, 1948. After the war he attended Creighton University School of Law and received his law degree in 1950. He also served in the US Army Reserves, first as battalion executive officer of the 416 Ordnance Battalion, and later the 82nd Field Hospital, and by 1958 had attained the rank of captain. That year he was elected judge advocate of the Nebraska Reserve Officers Association. In 1961, President Kennedy mobilized the national guard in reaction to the Cuban Missile Crisis and its tensions with the USSR and Cuba. Newly assigned to the 82nd, Murphy reported to Fort Carson, Colorado.

John and Mary Beth had 8 children, Colleen, Mary, Michael, Daniel, Elizabeth, Sue, Therese, and Joe.

== Early legal career ==
Murphy passed the bar in 1950. He served as a lawyer until 1956 when he was elected to a judgeship in the municipal courts. He participated in politics during that time, serving as treasurer for Democratic candidate Joseph V. Bensch in his unsuccessful senate campaign in 1954. He also was a member of the Omaha Youth Commission and a member of the North Omaha Kiwanis club, and served as President in 1957. His work on the bench exposed him to many cases involving alcohol abuse, and he joined the Omaha Area Council on Alcoholism, being elected vice-chairman of the group in 1960 and for some years after.

=== Municipal court ===
In 1956 two municipal judges retired and Murphy was endorsed by the Citizens Committee for Law Enforcement as well as by the Omaha World Herald, and he ran fifth in the election in which the top five were placed on the bench. As municipal court judge, Murphy's most high-profile case was one against Horace C. Buckingham who pleaded no contest for accusations that he had obtained money under false pretenses, having been paid for asphaltic oil that was never delivered.

== District bench ==
In 1960 he initially filed for his post at the municipal bench to be renewed, but by March had decided instead to run for district judge in the Fourth District of the Nebraska Courts, for which he was endorsed by the Omaha Judicial Citizens Committee, Omaha Bar Association, and the Omaha Civil Liberties Union. He was elected and initially slated to handle equity cases and civil lawsuits heard without juries – many of his cases would involve drunken driving and driving infractions. Soon after his election he was temporarily replaced on the district bench by Edward A. Mullery while he served in Colorado in the National Guard from October 1, 1961, to August 6, 1962. In 1962 Nebraska did away with popular judicial elections at the Supreme Court and District Court Levels, replacing elections with yes/no for each judge on the ballot resulting in a smoother re-election scheme. Murphy was retained in 1964 and 1970 elections. In 1964–1965 and again in 1970, he was elected by the other district 4 judges to the position of presiding judge over the court, replacing Paul J. Garrotto.

== Notable cases ==
As a district court judge, Murphy occasionally heard capital cases, cases where the death penalty was an allowed punishment. One prominent example was in the case of the slaying of 86-year-old Anna Dunning by William Henry Kauffman and Walter Edward Frans, who together plead guilty and received instead sentences of life in prison. In 1967, Omaha began its attempt to annex Millard, which quickly escalated to a legal battle, which Murphy oversaw in the district courts. The case escalated, eventually going to the US Supreme Court (which refused the case), and Millard was finally annexed in 1971. On October 16, Robert Julian Jacobs (AKA Anthony Ruiz) stabbed to death 12-year-old Allen Schmidt and stabbed Allen's brother Leslie during a sex-related attack. Murphy presided over the trial in which Jacobs pleaded not guilty by reason of insanity and was found guilty of first degree murder in a trial without a jury (no jury was at the request of the defense). Murphy's sentence was especially unique. He stated that he was very close to sentencing Jacobs to the death penalty, but felt that Jacobs "abnormal" mental and emotional state led him to spare Jacobs' life. He stated that he did not endorse abolition of the death penalty, as that would be a legislative matter, and that the death penalty was a fit punishment for those convicted of a hired killing, for inmates who killed guards, for mass killers such as those who bomb airlines, and for "many other kinds". Instead Murphy sentenced Jacobs to two life sentences plus 50 years with the special provision that Jacobs be placed in solitary confinement for 24 hours every year on the anniversary of the murder. In jail, Jacobs attacked other inmates and was not allowed into the general population. He committed suicide in his cell on October 21, 1972, about 8 months after sentencing.

=== Mayor Dworak bribery case ===
One of the most important political cases Judge Murphy presided over was a case accusing Mayor James Dworak of soliciting bribes. Dworak was first elected mayor in a tight race in 1961. His tenure was rocky, and during his re-election campaign in 1965 he was taped asking for a $25,000 campaign contribution in exchange for not vetoing a rezoning application of Chicago developer John B. Coleman. Dworak lost his bid for re-election while under indictment. The following spring he was acquitted by the jury, his main defense being that he was stringing Coleman along and. Murphy presided over the cases of the four other men indicted under similar accusations. Murphy initially dismissed the case against Planning Board member Carville R. "Barney" Buttner, while the others were tried together and all found guilty. and appealed. The Nebraska Supreme Court overturned Murphy's dismissal of the case against Buttner, who then pleaded no contest to a charge of malfeasance in public office, a misdemeanor, and was sentenced to a fine of $200. The Court upheld charges against the others.

== Later career ==
In 1974 Murphy was one of two district court judges who were nominated by other district court judges for a position on the Nebraska Supreme Court. However, the other judge, Donald Brodkey, was selected by state Governor J. James Exon. In 1978 Murphy announced plans to step down from the district court in favor of a position as an administrative law judge for the Social Security Division of the US Department of Health, Education, and Welfare. However, between that announcement and the start of the new job, Murphy changed his mind, instead taking a position as general counsel for Blue Cross and Blue Shield of Nebraska. Upon retirement, County Attorney Donald Knowles called Murphy "by far one of the best". Murphy died of lung cancer November 12, 1984.
