= Wahoo Township, Saunders County, Nebraska =

Wahoo Township
- Township
- Location in Saunders County
- Coordinates: 41°10′17″N 096°30′23″W
- Country: United States
- State: Nebraska
- County: Saunders

Area
  - Total: 31.17 sq mi (80.73 km^{2})
  - Land: 31.17 sq mi (80.72 km^{2})
  - Water: 0.0039 sq mi (0.01 km^{2}) 0.01%
- Elevation: 1,171 ft (357 m)

Population (2020)
  - Total: 398
  - Density: 12.8/sq mi (4.93/km^{2})
- GNIS feature ID: 0838311

Wahoo Township is one of twenty-four townships in Saunders County, Nebraska, United States. The population was 398 at the 2020 census. A 2021 estimate placed the township's population at 406.

The Village of Ithaca lies within the Township.

== See also ==
- County government in Nebraska
