= Morse Bluff Township, Saunders County, Nebraska =

Morse Bluff Township
- Township
- Location in Saunders County
- Coordinates: 41°24′31″N 096°44′33″W
- Country: United States
- State: Nebraska
- County: Saunders

Area
  - Total: 21.9 sq mi (56.8 km^{2})
  - Land: 21.64 sq mi (56.06 km^{2})
  - Water: 0.29 sq mi (0.74 km^{2}) 1.3%
- Elevation: 1,335 ft (407 m)

Population (2020)
  - Total: 370
  - Density: 17/sq mi (6.6/km^{2})
- GNIS feature ID: 0838145

Morse Bluff Township is one of twenty-four townships in Saunders County, Nebraska, United States. The population was 370 at the 2020 census. A 2021 estimate placed the township's population at 380.

The Village of Morse Bluff lies within the township.

== See also ==
- County government in Nebraska
