= Newman Township, Saunders County, Nebraska =

Newman Township
- Township
- Location in Saunders County
- Coordinates: 41°10′24″N 096°51′14″W
- Country: United States
- State: Nebraska
- County: Saunders

Area
  - Total: 36.2 sq mi (93.8 km^{2})
  - Land: 36.2 sq mi (93.8 km^{2})
  - Water: 0 sq mi (0 km^{2}) 0%
- Elevation: 1,510 ft (460 m)

Population (2020)
  - Total: 261
  - Density: 7.21/sq mi (2.78/km^{2})
- GNIS feature ID: 0838157

Newman Township is one of twenty-four townships in Saunders County, Nebraska, United States. The population was 261 at the 2020 census. A 2021 estimate placed the township's population at 268.

== See also ==
- County government in Nebraska
