= Clear Creek Township, Saunders County, Nebraska =

Clear Creek Township
- Township
- Location in Saunders County
- Coordinates: 41°05′37″N 096°23′49″W
- Country: United States
- State: Nebraska
- County: Saunders

Area
  - Total: 40.60 sq mi (105.16 km^{2})
  - Land: 39.80 sq mi (103.08 km^{2})
  - Water: 0.80 sq mi (2.08 km^{2}) 1.98%
- Elevation: 1,119 ft (341 m)

Population (2020)
  - Total: 1,211
  - Density: 30.43/sq mi (11.75/km^{2})
- GNIS feature ID: 0837924

Clear Creek Township is one of twenty-four townships in Saunders County, Nebraska, United States. The population was 1,211 at the 2020 census. A 2021 estimate placed the township's population at 1,241.

A portion of the City of Ashland lies within the Township.

== See also ==
- County government in Nebraska
