= Ithaca, Nebraska =

Village in Saunders County, Nebraska, United States

- Village
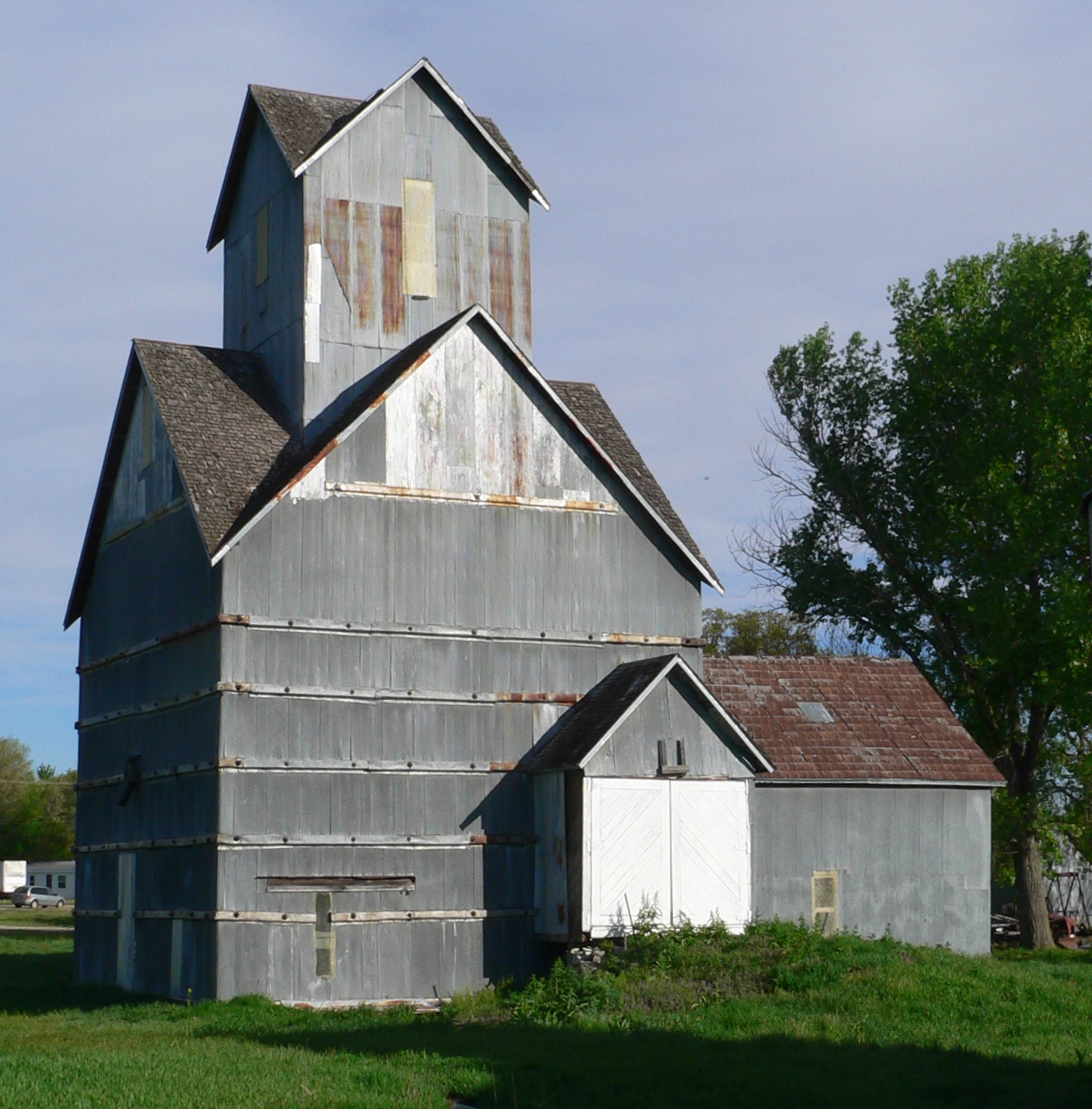
- Historic grain elevator in Ithaca. Built ca. 1890, it is listed in the National Register of Historic Places.

- Location of Ithaca, Nebraska

- Location within Nebraska Location within the United States
- Coordinates: 41°09′34″N 96°32′22″W
- Country: United States
- State: Nebraska
- County: Saunders
- Township: Wahoo

Area
  - Total: 0.23 sq mi (0.60 km^{2})
  - Land: 0.23 sq mi (0.60 km^{2})
  - Water: 0 sq mi (0.00 km^{2})
- Elevation: 1,135 ft (346 m)

Population (2020)
  - Total: 160
  - Density: 686.4/sq mi (265.03/km^{2})
- Time zone: UTC-6 (Central (CST))
  - Summer (DST): UTC-5 (CDT)
- ZIP code: 68033
- Area code: 402
- FIPS code: 31-24285
- GNIS feature ID: 2398282

Ithaca is a village in Saunders County, Nebraska, United States. The population was 160 at the 2020 census.

== History ==
Ithaca was founded in 1866. It was named after Ithaca, New York, the native home of a pioneer settler.

== Geography ==
According to the United States Census Bureau, the village has a total area of 0.23 square miles (0.60 km^{2}), all land.

== Demographics ==
Historical population
Census	Pop.	Note	%±
1910	171		—
1920	156		−8.8%
1930	137		−12.2%
1940	139		1.5%
1950	140		0.7%
1960	126		−10.0%
1970	121		−4.0%
1980	156		28.9%
1990	133		−14.7%
2000	168		26.3%
2010	148		−11.9%
2020	160		8.1%
U.S. Decennial Census

=== 2010 census ===
As of the census of 2010, there were 148 people, 57 households, and 40 families living in the village. The population density was 643.5 inhabitants per square mile (248.5/km^{2}). There were 58 housing units at an average density of 252.2 per square mile (97.4/km^{2}). The racial makeup of the village was 93.9% White, 4.1% Native American, and 2.0% from other races. Hispanic or Latino of any race were 8.1% of the population.

There were 57 households, of which 38.6% had children under the age of 18 living with them, 61.4% were married couples living together, 5.3% had a female householder with no husband present, 3.5% had a male householder with no wife present, and 29.8% were non-families. 26.3% of all households were made up of individuals, and 10.5% had someone living alone who was 65 years of age or older. The average household size was 2.60 and the average family size was 3.13.

The median age in the village was 36.7 years. 28.4% of residents were under the age of 18; 6.7% were between the ages of 18 and 24; 25% were from 25 to 44; 27.1% were from 45 to 64; and 12.8% were 65 years of age or older. The gender makeup of the village was 48.0% male and 52.0% female.

=== 2000 census ===
As of the census of 2000, there were 168 people, 57 households, and 42 families living in the village. The population density was 730.2 inhabitants per square mile (281.9/km^{2}). There were 58 housing units at an average density of 252.1 per square mile (97.3/km^{2}). The racial makeup of the village was 96.43% White, 1.79% Native American, and 1.79% from two or more races.

There were 57 households, out of which 38.6% had children under the age of 18 living with them, 66.7% were married couples living together, and 26.3% were non-families. 21.1% of all households were made up of individuals, and 8.8% had someone living alone who was 65 years of age or older. The average household size was 2.95 and the average family size was 3.50.

In the village, the population was spread out, with 33.3% under the age of 18, 8.3% from 18 to 24, 28.0% from 25 to 44, 17.3% from 45 to 64, and 13.1% who were 65 years of age or older. The median age was 35 years. For every 100 females, there were 93.1 males. For every 100 females age 18 and over, there were 111.3 males.

As of 2000 the median income for a household in the village was $36,875, and the median income for a family was $31,667. Males had a median income of $35,313 versus $24,167 for females. The per capita income for the village was $15,321. About 2.8% of families and 2.8% of the population were below the poverty line, including 2.2% of those under the age of eighteen and 3.1% of those 65 or over.

== Notable people ==
- Harold D. Hansen (1904-1987) - Brigadier general, U.S. Marine Corps

== See also ==
- List of municipalities in Nebraska
