= Elk Township, Saunders County, Nebraska =

Elk Township
- Township
- Location in Saunders County
- Coordinates: 41°15′51″N 096°51′08″W
- Country: United States
- State: Nebraska
- County: Saunders

Area
  - Total: 35.85 sq mi (92.84 km^{2})
  - Land: 35.76 sq mi (92.63 km^{2})
  - Water: 0.081 sq mi (0.21 km^{2}) 0.23%
- Elevation: 1,371 ft (418 m)

Population (2020)
  - Total: 286
  - Density: 8.00/sq mi (3.09/km^{2})
- GNIS feature ID: 0837981

Elk Township is one of twenty-four townships in Saunders County, Nebraska, United States. The population was 286 at the 2020 census. A 2021 estimate placed the township's population at 293.

A small portion of the Village of Prague lies within the Township.

== See also ==
- County government in Nebraska
