= Rock Creek Township, Saunders County, Nebraska =

Rock Creek Township
- Township
- Location in Saunders County
- Coordinates: 41°05′21″N 096°44′09″W
- Country: United States
- State: Nebraska
- County: Saunders

Area
  - Total: 36.09 sq mi (93.47 km^{2})
  - Land: 36.09 sq mi (93.47 km^{2})
  - Water: 0 sq mi (0 km^{2}) 0%
- Elevation: 1,309 ft (399 m)

Population (2020)
  - Total: 277
  - Density: 7.68/sq mi (2.96/km^{2})
- GNIS feature ID: 0838216

Rock Creek Township is one of twenty-four Saunders County, Nebraska, United States townships. The population was 277 at the 2020 census. The 2021 census estimate placed the township's population at 283.

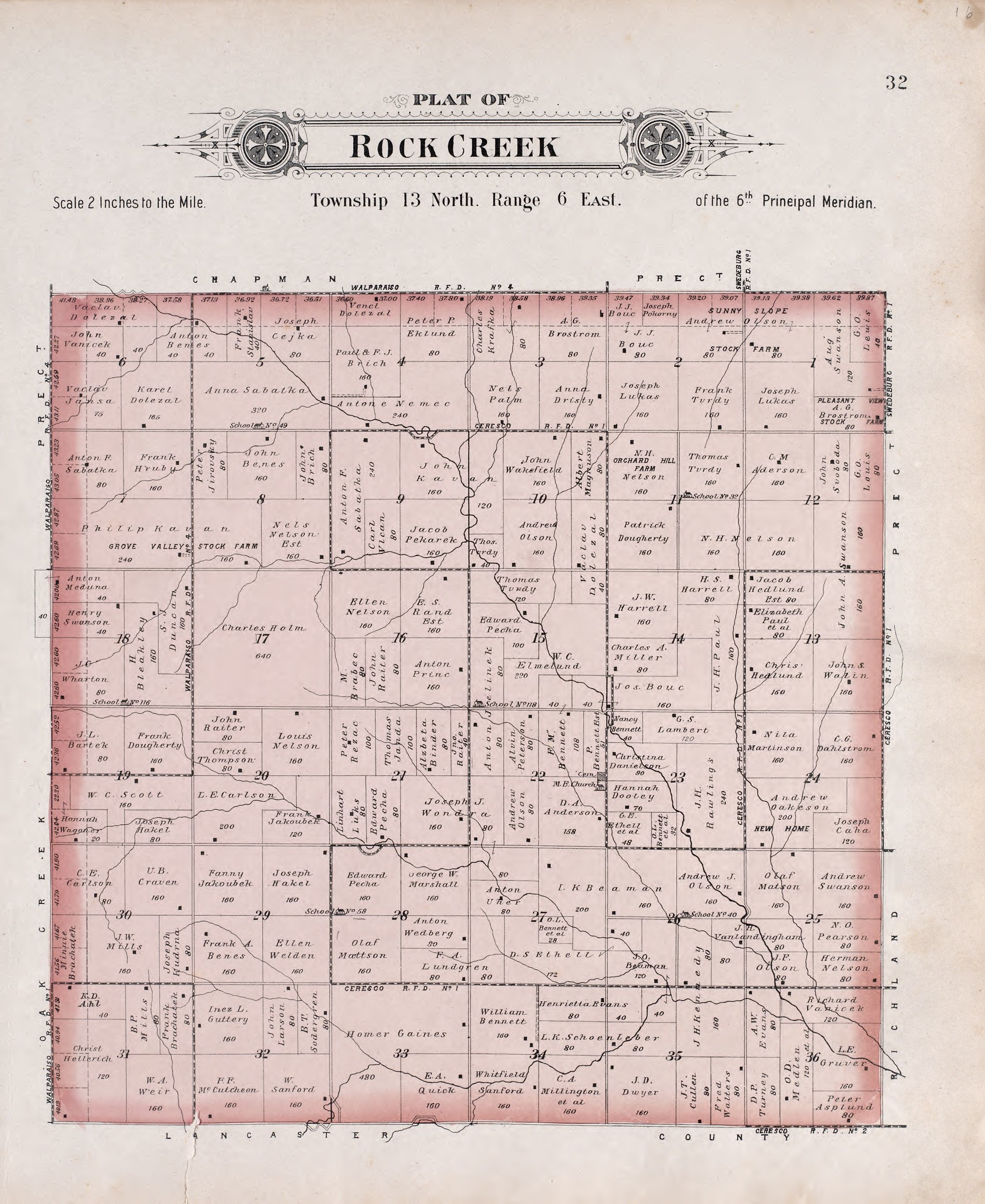
1907 map of Rock Creek Township, showing its sections and their owners

== See also ==
- County government in Nebraska
