= Leshara Township, Saunders County, Nebraska =

Leshara Township
- Township
- Location in Saunders County
- Coordinates: 41°20′03″N 096°26′51″W
- Country: United States
- State: Nebraska
- County: Saunders

Area
  - Total: 23.7 sq mi (61.3 km^{2})
  - Land: 22.6 sq mi (58.5 km^{2})
  - Water: 1.08 sq mi (2.81 km^{2}) 4.58%
- Elevation: 1,204 ft (367 m)

Population (2020)
  - Total: 565
  - Density: 25.0/sq mi (9.66/km^{2})
- GNIS feature ID: 0838084

Leshara Township is one of twenty-four townships in Saunders County, Nebraska, United States. The population was 565 at the 2020 census. A 2021 estimate placed the township's population at 580.

The Village of Leshara lies within the Township.

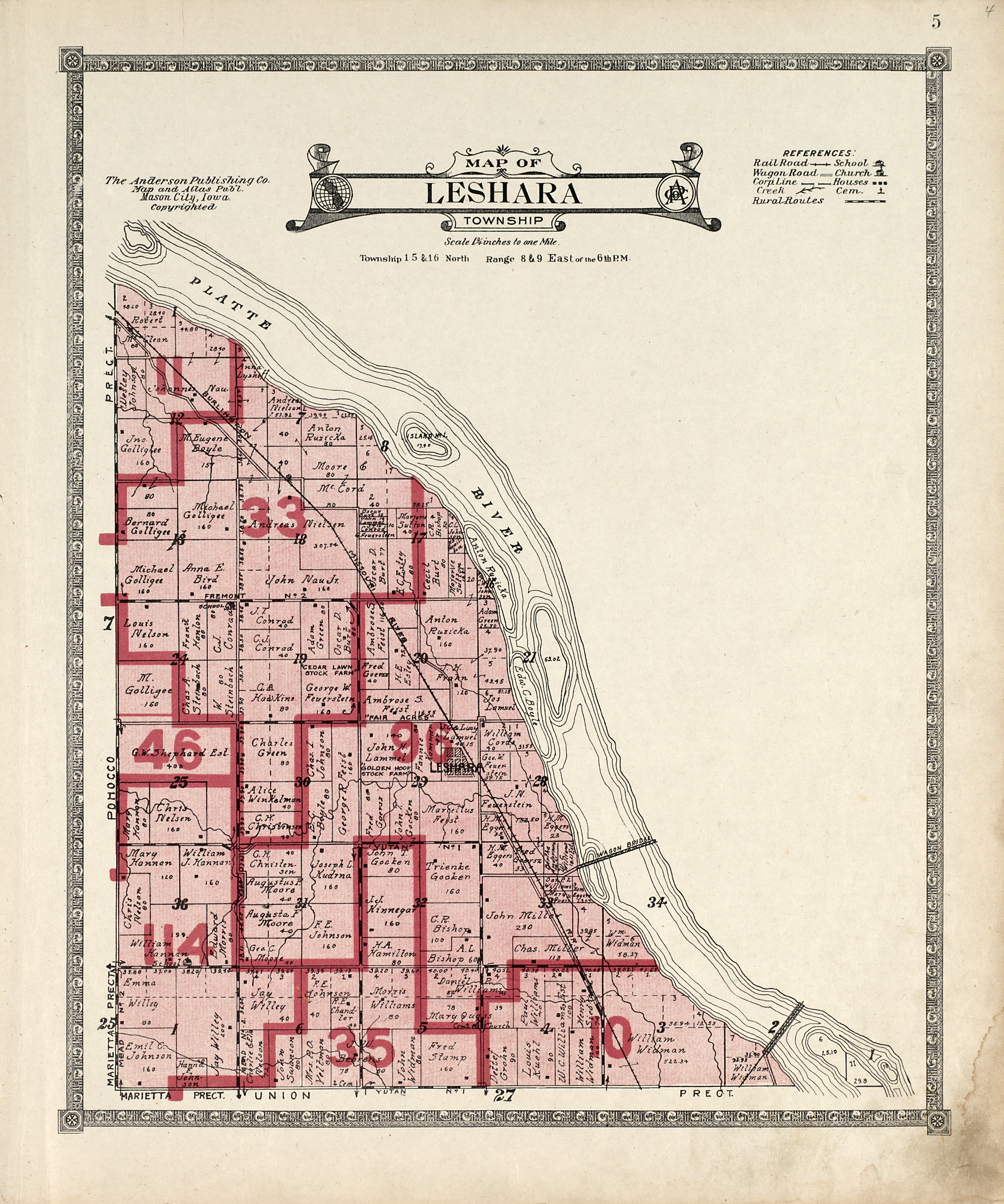
Leshara Township located in Saunders County, Nebraska (1916)

== See also ==
- County government in Nebraska
