= Union Township, Saunders County, Nebraska =

Union Township
- Township
- Location in Saunders County
- Coordinates: 41°15′20″N 096°24′56″W
- Country: United States
- State: Nebraska
- County: Saunders

Area
  - Total: 27.35 sq mi (70.84 km^{2})
  - Land: 26.51 sq mi (68.67 km^{2})
  - Water: 0.84 sq mi (2.17 km^{2}) 3.06%
- Elevation: 1,237 ft (377 m)

Population (2020)
  - Total: 1,945
  - Density: 73.36/sq mi (28.32/km^{2})
- GNIS feature ID: 0838300

Union Township is one of twenty-four townships in Saunders County, Nebraska, United States. The population was 1,945 at the 2020 census. A 2021 estimate placed the township's population at 1,997.

The City of Yutan lies within the Township.

== See also ==
- County government in Nebraska
