= Douglas Township, Saunders County, Nebraska =

Douglas Township
- Township
- Location in Saunders County
- Coordinates: 41°21′06″N 096°44′13″W
- Country: United States
- State: Nebraska
- County: Saunders

Area
  - Total: 32.01 sq mi (82.91 km^{2})
  - Land: 32.01 sq mi (82.91 km^{2})
  - Water: 0 sq mi (0 km^{2}) 0%
- Elevation: 1,309 ft (399 m)

Population (2020)
  - Total: 211
  - Density: 6.59/sq mi (2.54/km^{2})
- GNIS feature ID: 0837967

Douglas Township is one of twenty-four townships in Saunders County, Nebraska, United States. The population was 211 at the 2020 census. A 2021 estimate placed the township's population at 215.

== See also ==
- County government in Nebraska
