= Richland Township, Saunders County, Nebraska =

Richland Township
- Township
- Location in Saunders County
- Coordinates: 41°05′29″N 096°37′20″W
- Country: United States
- State: Nebraska
- County: Saunders

Area
  - Total: 36.23 sq mi (93.84 km^{2})
  - Land: 36.23 sq mi (93.84 km^{2})
  - Water: 0 sq mi (0 km^{2}) 0%
- Elevation: 1,250 ft (380 m)

Population (2020)
  - Total: 1,339
  - Density: 36.96/sq mi (14.27/km^{2})
- GNIS feature ID: 0838211

Richland Township is one of twenty-four townships in Saunders County, Nebraska, United States. The population was 1,339 at the 2020 census. A 2021 estimate placed the township's population at 1,363.

The Village of Ceresco lies within the Township.

== See also ==
- County government in Nebraska
