= Green Township, Saunders County, Nebraska =

Green Township
- Township
- Location in Saunders County
- Coordinates: 41°05′22″N 096°31′02″W
- Country: United States
- State: Nebraska
- County: Saunders

Area
  - Total: 31.31 sq mi (81.08 km^{2})
  - Land: 31.31 sq mi (81.08 km^{2})
  - Water: 0 sq mi (0 km^{2}) 0%
- Elevation: 1,217 ft (371 m)

Population (2020)
  - Total: 258
  - Density: 8.24/sq mi (3.18/km^{2})
- GNIS feature ID: 0838042

Green Township is one of twenty-four townships in Saunders County, Nebraska, United States. The population was 258 at the 2020 census. A 2021 estimate placed the township's population at 265.

== See also ==
- County government in Nebraska
