= Section (United States land surveying) =

One square mile

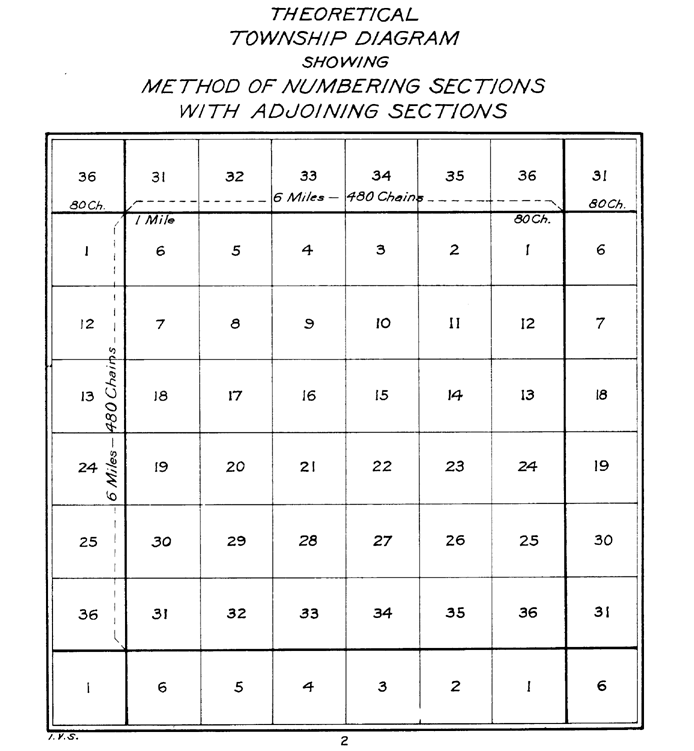
Sectioning a township (36 sections).

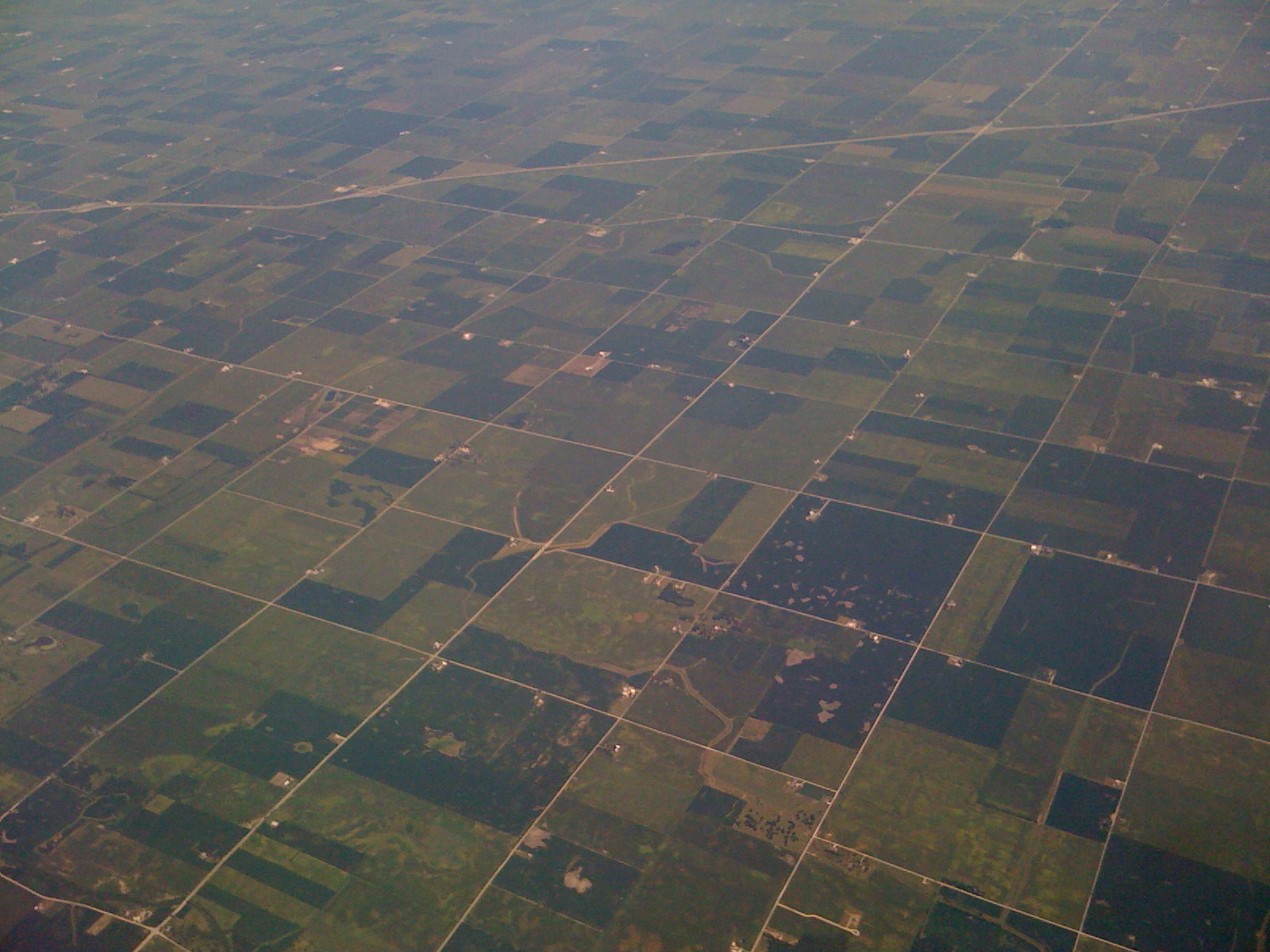
Perfectly square 160-acre quarter sections of farmland cover central Indiana.

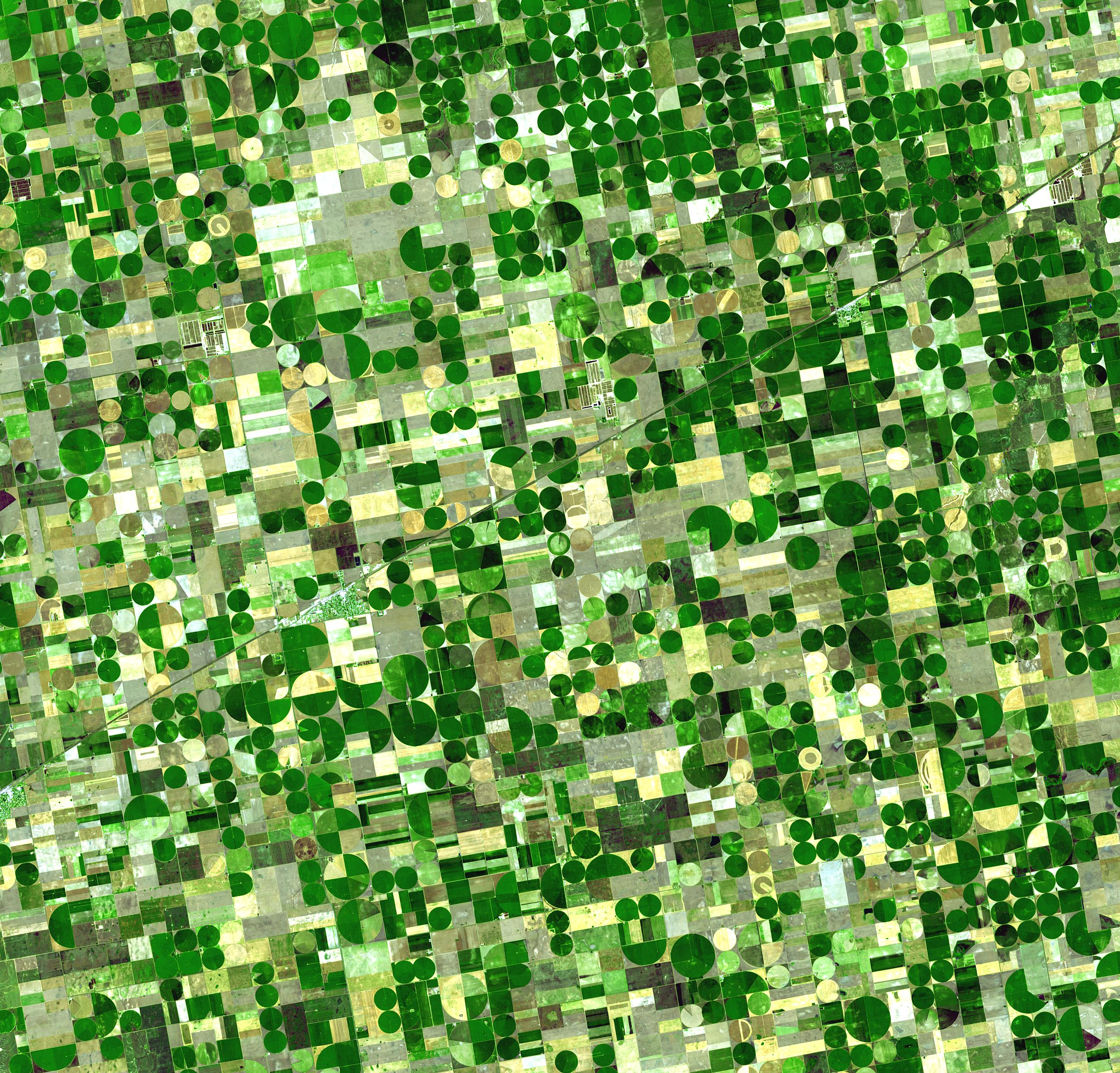
Satellite image of crops growing in southwest Kansas, mainly using center pivot irrigation. The primary grid pattern is of quarter sections (1/2 mi × 1/2 mi (800 m × 800 m)).

In U.S. land surveying under the Public Land Survey System (PLSS), a section is an area nominally one square mile (2.6 square kilometers), containing 640 acres (260 hectares), with 36 sections making up one survey township on a rectangular grid.

== Description ==
The legal description of a tract of land under the PLSS includes the name of the state, name of the county, township number, range number, section number, and portion of a section. Sections are customarily surveyed into smaller squares by repeated halving and quartering. A quarter section is 160 acres (65 ha) and a "quarter-quarter section" is 40 acres (16 ha). In 1832 the smallest area of land that could be acquired was reduced to the 40-acre (16 ha) quarter-quarter section, and this size parcel became entrenched in American mythology. After the Civil War, freedmen (freed slaves) were reckoned to be self-sufficient with "40 acres and a mule," though they never received it. In the 20th century real estate developers preferred working with 40-acre (16 ha) parcels. The phrases "front 40" and "back 40," referring to farm fields, indicate the front and back quarter-quarter sections of land.

One of the reasons for creating sections of 640 acres (260 ha) was the ease of dividing into halves and quarters while still maintaining a whole number of acres. A section can be halved seven times in this way, down to a 5-acre (2 ha) parcel, or half of a quarter-quarter-quarter section—an easily surveyed 50-square-chain (2 ha) area. This system was of great practical value on the American frontier, where surveyors often had a shaky grasp of mathematics and were required to work quickly.

A description of a quarter-quarter section in standard abbreviated form, might look like "NW 1/4, NE 1/4, Sec. 34, T.3S, R.1W, 1st P.M." or, alternatively, "34-3-1 NW4NE4 1PM". In expanded form, this would read:

The Northwest quarter of the Northeast quarter of Section 34 of Township 3 South, Range 1 West, first Principal Meridian.

== History ==
The existence of section lines made property descriptions far more straightforward than the old metes and bounds system. The establishment of standard east–west and north–south lines ("township" and "range lines") meant that deeds could be written without regard to temporary terrain features such as trees, piles of rocks, fences, and the like, and be worded in the style such as "Lying and being in Township 4 North; Range 7 West; and being the northwest quadrant of the southwest quadrant of said section," an exact description in this case of 40 acres, as there are 640 acres (260 ha) in a square mile.

The importance of "sections" was greatly enhanced by the passage of "An Ordinance for ascertaining the mode of disposing of lands in the Western Territory" of 1785 by the U.S. Congress (see Land Ordinance of 1785). This law provided that lands outside the existing states could not be sold, otherwise distributed, or opened for settlement prior to being surveyed. The standard way of doing this was to divide the land into sections. An area of six sections by six sections would define a township. Within this area, one section (section 16) was designated as school land. As the entire parcel would not be necessary for the school and its grounds, the balance of it was to be sold, with the monies to go into the construction and upkeep of the school. Section 36 was also subsequently added as a school section in western states. The ordinance also specified that out of every township, the four lots, being numbered 8, 11, 26, 29, and out of every fractional part of a township, so many lots of the same numbers as shall be found thereon, for future sale.

On May 20, 1862, President Abraham Lincoln signed into law the Homestead Act, by which settlers could "claim" 160 acres (a quarter section) of public land. Claimants were required to "live on" and “improve” their plots by cultivating the land. After five years, the original filer of the claim was entitled to the property, free and clear, except for a small registration fee.

== Numbering within a township ==
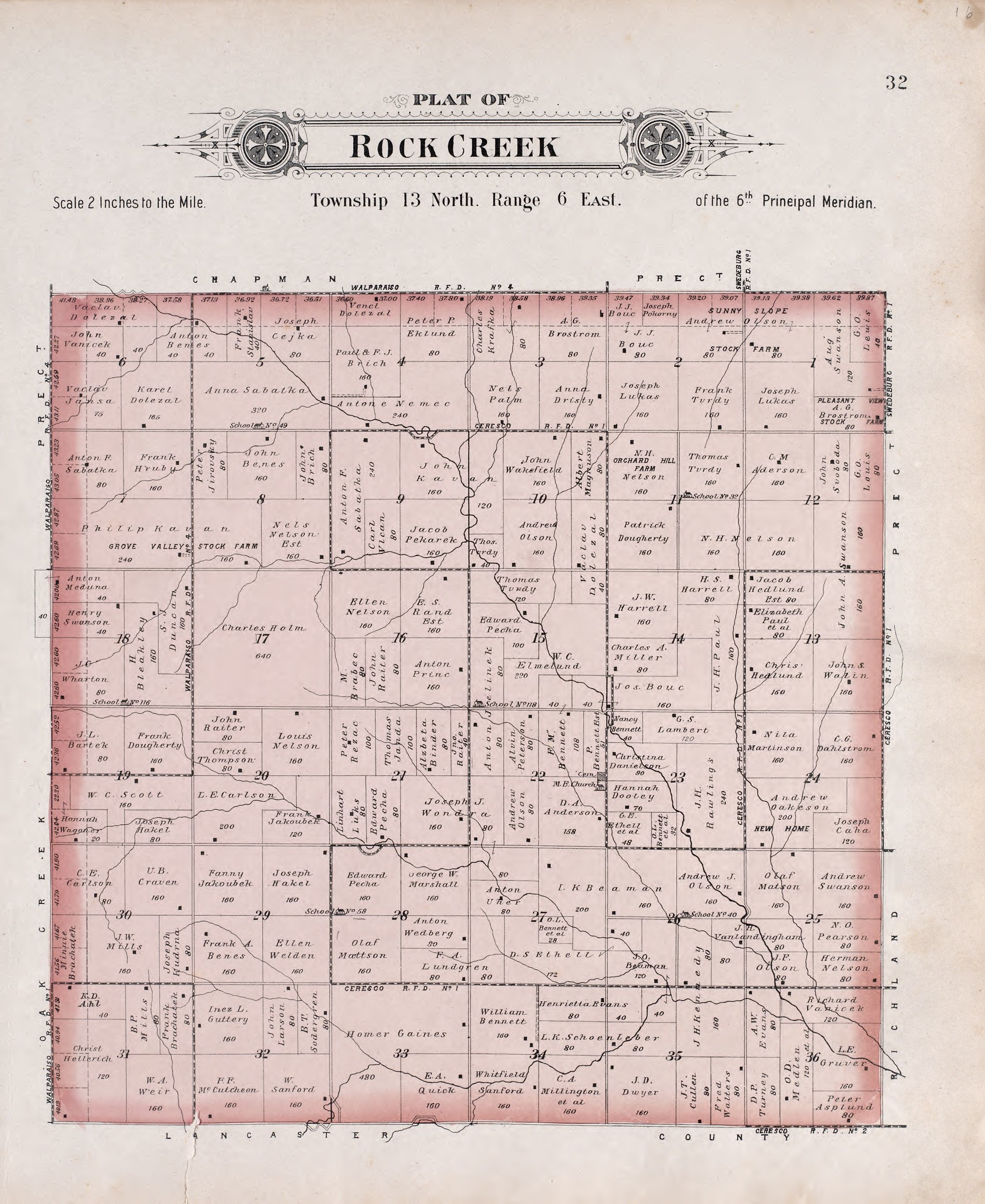
Section map of Rock Creek Township, Saunders County, Nebraska (1907)

Every township is divided into 36 sections, each usually 1 mile (1.6 km) square. Sections are numbered boustrophedonically within townships as follows (north at top):

6	5	4	3	2	1
7	8	9	10	11	12
18	17	16	15	14	13
19	20	21	22	23	24
30	29	28	27	26	25
31	32	33	34	35	36

== Section subdivisions ==
Sections can be divided into quarter sections of 160 acres (65 ha), named by intercardinal direction (northwest, northeast, etc.). For instance, the southwest quarter of a section is named SW 1/4.

NW	NE
SW	SE

Sections can be further broken up into 40-acre (16 ha) blocks, or quarter-quarter sections. These add a second intercardinal direction label. For instance, the southeast quarter of the southwest quarter section mentioned above is labeled SE 1/4, SW 1/4:

NWNW	NENW	NWNE	NENE
SWNW	SENW	SWNE	SENE
NWSW	NESW	NWSE	NESE
SWSW	SESW	SWSE	SESE

== Measurement anomalies ==
The curvature of the Earth makes it impossible to superimpose a regular grid on its surface, as the meridians converge toward the North Pole. As the U.S. is in the Northern Hemisphere, if a section's or township's east and west sides lie along meridians, its north side is shorter than its south side. Because sections were surveyed from south and east to north and west, accumulated errors and distortions resulted in the north and west lines, and north and west sections diverged the most from the ideal shape and size.

The entire township grid shifts to account for the Earth's curvature. Where the grid is corrected, or where two grids based on different principal meridians meet, section shapes are irregular. Sections also differ from the PLSS ideal of one square mile for other reasons, including errors and sloppy work by surveyors, poor instrumentation, and difficult terrain. In addition, the primary survey tool was the magnetic compass, which is influenced by local irregularities. Once established, even an imperfect grid remains in force, mainly because the monuments of the original survey, when recovered, hold legal precedent over subsequent surveys.

== Alternatives and legacy systems ==
The Public Land Survey System was not the first to define and implement a survey grid. Similar systems were established, often using terms like section and township but not necessarily in the same way. For example, the lands of the Holland Purchase in western New York were surveyed into a township grid before the PLSS was established. In colonial New England land was often divided into squares called towns or townships and further subdivided into parcels called lots or sections.

Sections are used in land descriptions in the portion of northwestern Georgia that was formerly part of the territory of the Cherokee Nation. They are not, however, part of the PLSS and are irregular in shape and size.

Another exception to the usual use of sections and section numbering occurs when most of a parcel, or lot, falls under a body of water. The term "government lot" is used for such parcels and they are usually described separately from the rest of the section using single numbers (such as "Government Lot 5 of Section 15"). Also, parcels within a platted subdivision are often specified by lot number rather than using PLSS descriptions.

Where Spanish land grants in Florida have descriptions that predate PLSS or even the U.S. itself, deviation from typical section numbering and size and shape often takes place. In an effort to honor these land grants after the U.S. took control of Florida, surveyors would use descriptions from confirmed land grants to establish their initial boundaries and created PLSS sections that extrapolated from those lines. Often, the amount of land left over in areas immediately surrounding the grants was grossly undersized or awkwardly shaped. Those tracts are referred to as "fractional sections" and often are not subject to township or range definitions. An example of such a legal description's beginning would read "Being a portion of Fractional Sec. 59, Township 0 South, Range 0 West". Land north of the Watson Line near the Georgia border was not subject to the standard U.S. section, township and range designations, since the state of Georgia had claimed and laid out counties and surveyed its public lands south of that line into what eventually became part of the state of Florida. The exact location of the Georgia–Florida state line was ultimately confirmed by an act of Congress, approved April 9, 1872.

== See also ==
- Canadian Dominion Land Survey
