= Yutan, Nebraska =

City in Saunders County, Nebraska, United States

- City
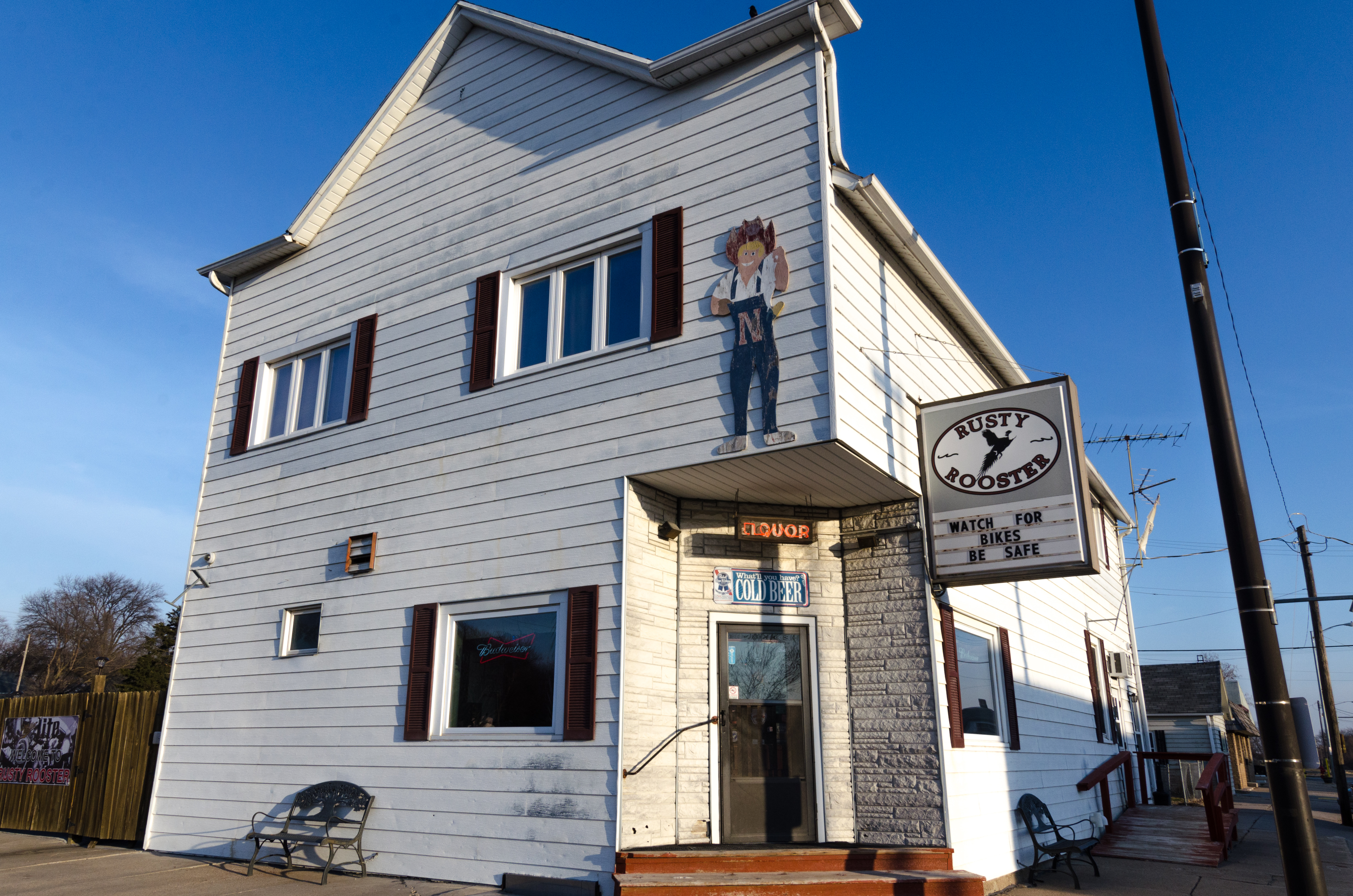
- Rusty Rooster Bar in downtown Yutan, March 2017
- Nickname: "Home of the Chieftains"
- Location of Yutan, Nebraska

- Location within Nebraska Location within the United States
- Coordinates: 41°14′40″N 96°23′54″W
- Country: United States
- State: Nebraska
- County: Saunders
- Township: Union

Area
  - Total: 0.58 sq mi (1.49 km^{2})
  - Land: 0.58 sq mi (1.49 km^{2})
  - Water: 0 sq mi (0.00 km^{2})
- Elevation: 1,155 ft (352 m)

Population (2020)
  - Total: 1,347
  - Density: 2,347/sq mi (906.3/km^{2})
- Time zone: UTC-6 (Central (CST))
  - Summer (DST): UTC-5 (CDT)
- ZIP code: 68073
- Area code: 402
- FIPS code: 31-54115
- GNIS feature ID: 2397396
- Website: www.yutannebraska.com

Yutan is located in Saunders County, Nebraska, United States. As of the 2020 census, Yutan had a population of 1,347. It sits along Upper Clear Creek. It is named after Chief “Itan”, whose Native American tribe used to reside in the area.

== History ==
Yutan was originally called Clear Creek, and under the latter name was platted in 1876 when the Omaha and Republican Valley Railroad was extended to that point. It was renamed in 1884 after Ietan, an Otoe Indian chief.

== Geography ==
According to the United States Census Bureau, the city has a total area of 0.53 square miles (1.37 km^{2}), all land.

== Demographics ==
Historical population
Census	Pop.	Note	%±
1890	168		—
1900	263		56.5%
1910	353		34.2%
1920	300		−15.0%
1930	313		4.3%
1940	268		−14.4%
1950	287		7.1%
1960	335		16.7%
1970	507		51.3%
1980	631		24.5%
1990	626		−0.8%
2000	1,216		94.2%
2010	1,174		−3.5%
2020	1,347		14.7%
U.S. Decennial Census

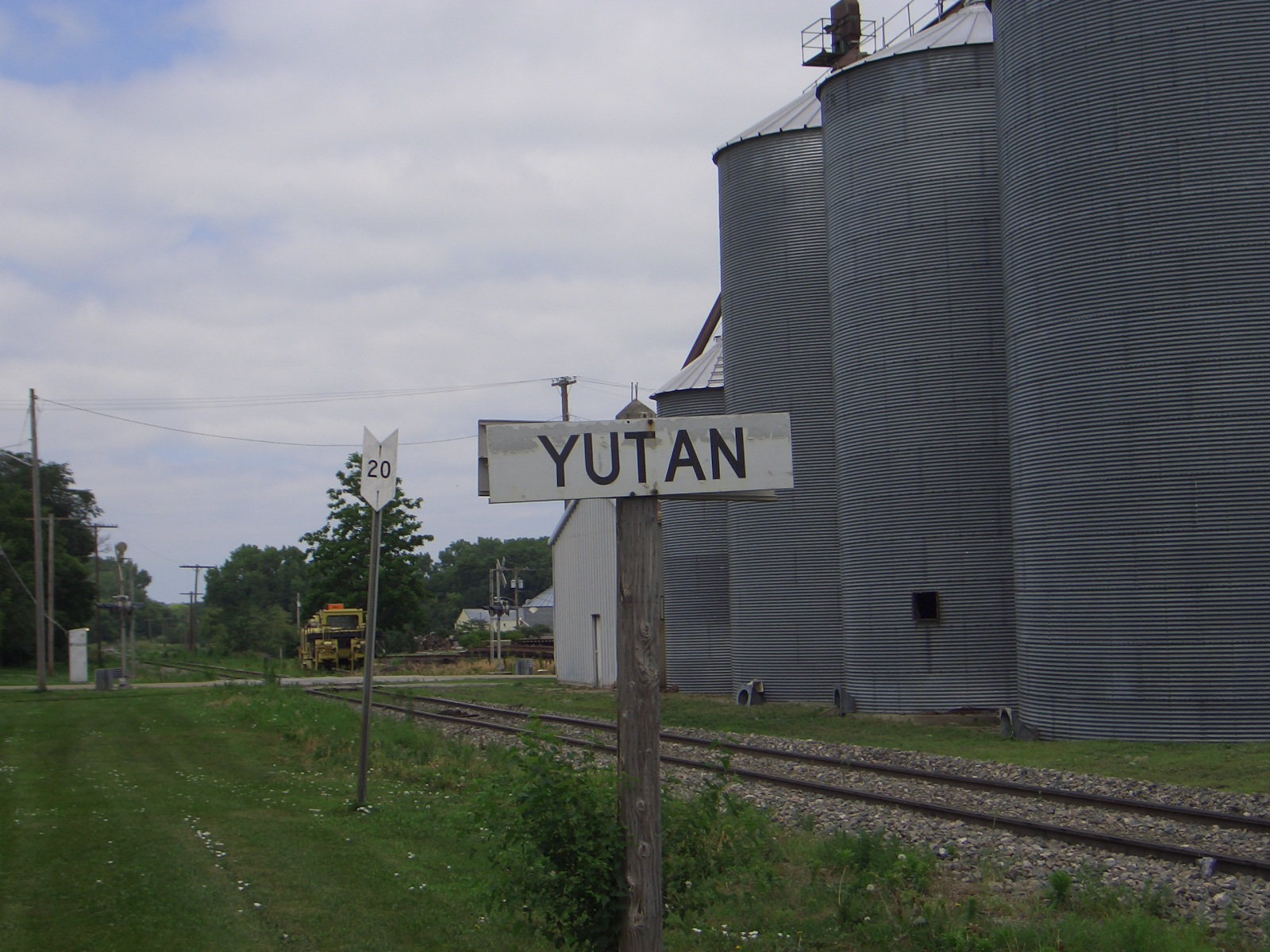
Yutan Rail Yard, June 2006

=== 2010 census ===
As of the census of 2010, there were 1,174 people, 432 households, and 324 families living in the city. The population density was 2,215.1 inhabitants per square mile (855.3/km^{2}). There were 449 housing units at an average density of 847.2 per square mile (327.1/km^{2}). The racial makeup of the city was 98.0% White, 0.9% African American, 0.1% Native American, 0.1% Asian, 0.4% from other races, and 0.5% from two or more races. Hispanic or Latino of any race were 1.9% of the population.

There were 432 households, of which 41.7% had children under the age of 18 living with them, 56.5% were married couples living together, 12.0% had a female householder with no husband present, 6.5% had a male householder with no wife present, and 25.0% were non-families. 20.4% of all households were made up of individuals, and 8.4% had someone living alone who was 65 years of age or older. The average household size was 2.72 and the average family size was 3.12.

The median age in the city was 35.4 years. 30.9% of residents were under the age of 18; 7.3% were between the ages of 18 and 24; 25% were from 25 to 44; 26.8% were from 45 to 64; and 10% were 65 years of age or older. The gender makeup of the city was 50.1% male and 49.9% female.

=== 2000 census ===
As of the census of 2000, there were 1,216 people, 406 households, and 319 families living in the city. The population density was 2,561.3 inhabitants per square mile (988.9/km^{2}). There were 423 housing units at an average density of 891.0 per square mile (344.0/km^{2}). The racial makeup of the city was 96.71% White, 0.16% African American, 0.82% Native American, 0.49% Asian, 0.25% from other races, and 1.56% from two or more races. Hispanic or Latino of any race were 1.15% of the population.

There were 406 households, out of which 45.1% had children under the age of 18 living with them, 63.1% were married couples living together, 11.8% had a female householder with no husband present, and 21.4% were non-families. 17.7% of all households were made up of individuals, and 7.1% had someone living alone who was 65 years of age or older. The average household size was 3.00 and the average family size was 3.43.

In the city, the population was spread out, with 35.0% under the age of 18, 8.1% from 18 to 24, 31.8% from 25 to 44, 17.8% from 45 to 64, and 7.3% who were 65 years of age or older. The median age was 32 years. For every 100 females, there were 103.0 males. For every 100 females age 18 and over, there were 92.7 males.

As of 2000 the median income for a household in the city was $44,844, and the median income for a family was $52,273. Males had a median income of $36,310 versus $25,850 for females. The per capita income for the city was $16,675. About 1.9% of families and 2.6% of the population were below the poverty line, including 3.5% of those under age 18 and 9.3% of those age 65 or over.

== Education ==
Yutan's schools are administered by Yutan Public Schools. Yutan Elementary School and Yutan High School are located in the city.

== See also ==
- List of municipalities in Nebraska
