= Ashland Township, Saunders County, Nebraska =

Ashland Township
- Township
- Location in Saunders County
- Coordinates: 41°01′01″N 096°24′00″W
- Country: United States
- State: Nebraska
- County: Saunders

Area
  - Total: 14.62 sq mi (37.86 km^{2})
  - Land: 14.47 sq mi (37.48 km^{2})
  - Water: 0.15 sq mi (0.39 km^{2}) 1.03%
- Elevation: 1,102 ft (336 m)

Population (2020)
  - Total: 3,180
  - Density: 220/sq mi (84.8/km^{2})
- ZIP code: 68003
- Area codes: 402 and 531
- GNIS feature ID: 0837862

Ashland Township is one of twenty-four townships in Saunders County, Nebraska, United States. The population was 3,180 at the 2020 census. A 2021 estimate placed the township's population at 3,286.

Most of the City of Ashland lies within the Township.

== See also ==
- County government in Nebraska
