= Saunders County, Nebraska =

County in Nebraska, United States

- County
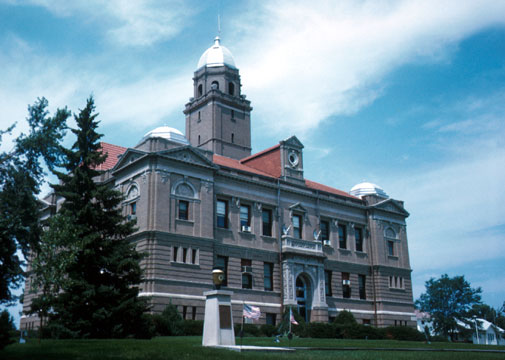
- The Saunders County Courthouse in Wahoo

- Location within the U.S. state of Nebraska
- Coordinates: 41.222966°N 96.642696°W
- Country: United States
- State: Nebraska
- Created: January 26, 1856
- Organized: October 8, 1867
- Named for: Alvin Saunders
- Seat: Wahoo
- Largest city: Wahoo

Area
  - Total: 759.820 sq mi (1,967.92 km^{2})
  - Land: 748.703 sq mi (1,939.13 km^{2})
  - Water: 11.117 sq mi (28.79 km^{2}) 1.46%

Population (2020)
  - Total: 22,278
  - Estimate (2025): 23,702 ▲
  - Density: 29.755/sq mi (11.489/km^{2})
- Time zone: UTC−6 (Central)
  - Summer (DST): UTC−5 (CDT)
- Area code: 402 and 531
- Congressional district: 2nd
- Website: saunderscounty.ne.gov
- • Nebraska county number 78 • Nebraska license plate prefix 06

Saunders County is a county in the U.S. state of Nebraska. As of the 2020 census, the population was 22,278, and was estimated to be 23,702 in 2025. The county seat and the largest city is Wahoo.

Saunders County is included in the Omaha–Council Bluffs metropolitan area.

In the Nebraska license plate system, Saunders County was represented by the prefix "6" (as it had the sixth-largest number of vehicles registered in the state when the license plate system was established in 1922).

== History ==
Saunders County was created on January 26, 1856 act of the Nebraska Territorial Legislature, and was organized on October 8, 1867; its boundaries were redefined in 1858. It was originally named Calhoun County after John Calhoun, surveyor general of Kansas and Nebraska. Other sources contend that it was named for John C. Calhoun of South Carolina. In 1862, during the American Civil War, it was renamed after Nebraska territorial governor Alvin Saunders.

The first town in Saunders County was Ashland, then known as Saline Ford. Settlers continuing west from Nebraska City would often follow the Platte River across the state. To do so, they would have to cross the Salt Creek. A limestone-bottomed section of the creek near Ashland offered the safest opportunity. Permanent settlers occupied the area in the 1850s and the town of Ashland was officially formed in 1866.

Ashland served as the county seat of government beginning with the first elections in 1867. A courthouse was constructed in 1870. As Saunders County grew, residents realized they wanted a more centrally located seat of government. A vote was held in 1873 and Wahoo was selected to replace Ashland. The new courthouse was built in 1874. That building served the county until 1904 when a new building was constructed. The 1904 courthouse is still in use as of 2025.

== Geography ==
According to the United States Census Bureau, the county has a total area of 759.820 square miles (1,967.92 km^{2}), of which 748.703 square miles (1,939.13 km^{2}) is land and 11.117 square miles (28.79 km^{2}) (1.46%) is water. It is the 29th-largest county in Nebraska by total area.

Saunders County is bordered on the north and east by the Platte River. Several local drainages move runoff water from the county eastward into the Platte. The county terrain is composed of low rolling hills, which slope eastward and northeastward to the river valley.

=== Major highways ===
- U.S. Highway 6
- U.S. Highway 77
- Nebraska Highway 64
- Nebraska Highway 66
- Nebraska Highway 79
- Nebraska Highway 92
- Nebraska Highway 109

=== Adjacent counties ===
- Douglas County – east
- Sarpy County – east
- Cass County – southeast
- Lancaster County – south
- Butler County – west
- Dodge County – north

=== Protected areas ===
- Bramble State Wildlife Management Area
- Czechland Lake Recreation and Wildlife Management Area
- Jack Sinn Memorial State Wildlife Management Area
- Memphis Lake State Recreation Area
- Pioneer State Recreation Area

== Demographics ==
Historical population
Census	Pop.	Note	%±
1870	4,547		—
1880	15,810		247.7%
1890	21,577		36.5%
1900	22,085		2.4%
1910	21,179		−4.1%
1920	20,589		−2.8%
1930	20,167		−2.0%
1940	17,892		−11.3%
1950	16,923		−5.4%
1960	17,270		2.1%
1970	17,018		−1.5%
1980	18,716		10.0%
1990	18,285		−2.3%
2000	19,830		8.4%
2010	20,780		4.8%
2020	22,278		7.2%
2025 (est.)	23,702	▲	6.4%
U.S. Decennial Census; 1790–1960 1900–1990; 1990–2000 2010–2020

=== 2020 census ===
As of the 2020 census, the county had a population of 22,278. The median age was 41.2 years. 25.4% of residents were under the age of 18 and 18.6% of residents were 65 years of age or older. For every 100 females there were 103.3 males, and for every 100 females age 18 and over there were 101.7 males age 18 and over.

The racial makeup of the county was 93.8% White, 0.4% Black or African American, 0.4% American Indian and Alaska Native, 0.4% Asian, 0.0% Native Hawaiian and Pacific Islander, 1.0% from some other race, and 4.0% from two or more races. Hispanic or Latino residents of any race comprised 2.6% of the population.

21.5% of residents lived in urban areas, while 78.5% lived in rural areas.

There were 8,667 households in the county, of which 31.0% had children under the age of 18 living with them and 19.1% had a female householder with no spouse or partner present. About 25.1% of all households were made up of individuals and 12.7% had someone living alone who was 65 years of age or older.

There were 9,987 housing units, of which 13.2% were vacant. Among occupied housing units, 79.6% were owner-occupied and 20.4% were renter-occupied. The homeowner vacancy rate was 1.5% and the rental vacancy rate was 7.8%.

=== 2010 census ===
As of the 2010 census, there were 20,778 people and 8,040 households. The population density was 28 people per square mile (11 people/km^{2}). There were 9,221 housing units at an average density of 12.3 units per square mile (4.7 units/km^{2}). The racial makeup of the county was 97.2% White, 0.3% Black or African American, 0.3% Native American, 0.4% Asian, 0.00% Pacific Islander, 0.7% from other races, and 1.1% from two or more races. 2.0% of the population were Hispanic or Latino of any race.

=== 2000 census ===
As of the 2000 census, there were 19,830 people, 7,498 households, and 5,443 families in the county. The population density was 26 people per square mile (10 people/km^{2}). There were 8,266 housing units at an average density of 11 units per square mile (4.2 units/km^{2}). The racial makeup of the county was 98.49% White, 0.11% Black or African American, 0.29% Native American, 0.22% Asian, 0.01% Pacific Islander, 0.35% from other races, and 0.55% from two or more races. 1.03% of the population were Hispanic or Latino of any race.

There were 7,498 households, out of which 34.20% had children under the age of 18 living with them, 62.60% were married couples living together, 6.70% had a female householder with no husband present, and 27.40% were non-families. 23.60% of all households were made up of individuals, and 11.90% had someone living alone who was 65 years of age or older. The average household size was 2.61 and the average family size was 3.11.

The county population contained 27.90% under the age of 18, 6.30% from 18 to 24, 27.60% from 25 to 44, 22.90% from 45 to 64, and 15.30% who were 65 years of age or older. The median age was 38 years. For every 100 females there were 99.10 males. For every 100 females age 18 and over, there were 98.10 males.

The median income for a household in the county was $42,173, and the median income for a family was $49,443. Males had a median income of $33,309 versus $22,922 for females. The per capita income for the county was $18,392. About 5.30% of families and 6.60% of the population were below the poverty line, including 7.30% of those under age 18 and 7.00% of those age 65 or over.

== Communities ==
=== Cities ===
- Ashland
- Wahoo (county seat)
- Yutan

=== Villages ===
- Cedar Bluffs
- Ceresco
- Colon
- Ithaca
- Leshara
- Malmo
- Mead
- Memphis
- Morse Bluff
- Prague
- Valparaiso
- Weston

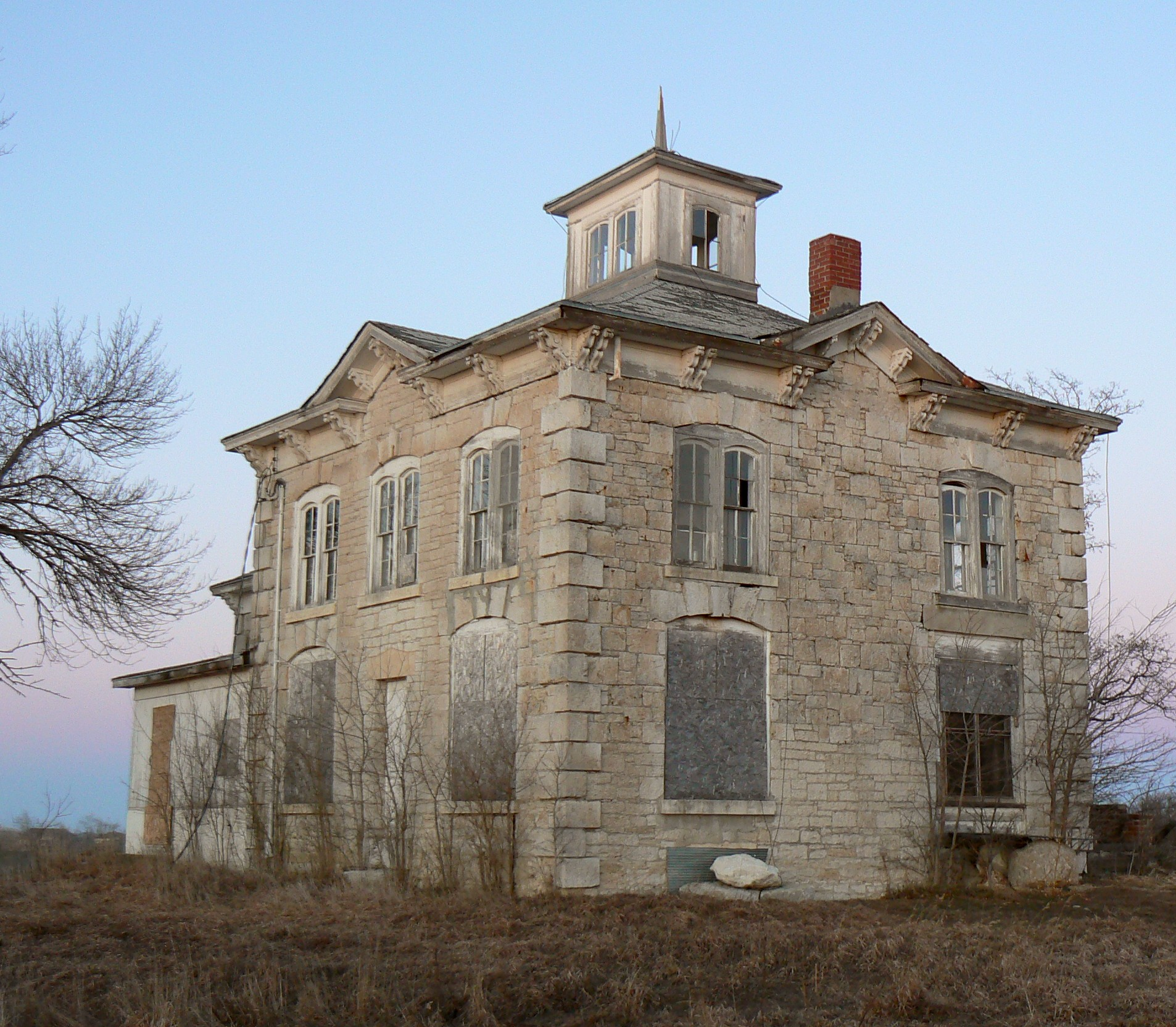
Historic schoolhouse in Saunders County

=== Census-designated place ===
- Wann

=== Townships ===
- Ashland
- Bohemia
- Center
- Chapman
- Chester
- Clear Creek
- Douglas
- Elk
- Green
- Leshara
- Marble
- Marietta
- Mariposa
- Morse Bluff
- Newman
- North Cedar
- Oak Creek
- Pohocco
- Richland
- Rock Creek
- South Cedar
- Stocking
- Union
- Wahoo

== Politics ==
Saunders County voters tend to vote Republican. In only two national elections since 1936 has the county selected the Democratic Party candidate (as of 2024)

United States presidential election results for Saunders County, Nebraska
Year	Republican		Democratic		Third party(ies)	
Year	No.	%	No.	%	No.	%
1900	2,325	44.82%	2,762	53.25%	100	1.93%
1904	2,880	60.14%	1,091	22.78%	818	17.08%
1908	2,309	45.18%	2,679	52.42%	123	2.41%
1912	864	18.79%	2,080	45.23%	1,655	35.99%
1916	1,957	40.83%	2,671	55.73%	165	3.44%
1920	3,733	59.99%	2,296	36.90%	194	3.12%
1924	3,499	45.15%	2,823	36.43%	1,427	18.42%
1928	5,356	58.31%	3,793	41.29%	37	0.40%
1932	2,772	30.35%	6,134	67.16%	228	2.50%
1936	3,773	39.36%	5,514	57.52%	300	3.13%
1940	4,917	54.16%	4,162	45.84%	0	0.00%
1944	6,615	61.17%	4,199	38.83%	0	0.00%
1948	3,660	47.91%	3,979	52.09%	0	0.00%
1952	5,525	65.10%	2,962	34.90%	0	0.00%
1956	4,973	59.86%	3,335	40.14%	0	0.00%
1960	4,702	56.94%	3,556	43.06%	0	0.00%
1964	3,345	44.50%	4,172	55.50%	0	0.00%
1968	3,429	57.39%	1,990	33.31%	556	9.31%
1972	4,282	63.13%	2,501	36.87%	0	0.00%
1976	3,844	51.24%	3,507	46.75%	151	2.01%
1980	5,223	66.06%	2,034	25.73%	649	8.21%
1984	5,217	67.34%	2,467	31.84%	63	0.81%
1988	4,459	55.46%	3,526	43.86%	55	0.68%
1992	4,037	44.11%	2,509	27.41%	2,606	28.47%
1996	4,514	52.51%	2,777	32.30%	1,306	15.19%
2000	5,688	63.77%	2,852	31.98%	379	4.25%
2004	6,441	67.88%	2,884	30.39%	164	1.73%
2008	6,188	60.60%	3,767	36.89%	257	2.52%
2012	6,770	65.65%	3,307	32.07%	235	2.28%
2016	7,555	69.57%	2,523	23.23%	782	7.20%
2020	9,108	71.23%	3,331	26.05%	347	2.71%
2024	9,854	72.34%	3,558	26.12%	210	1.54%

== See also ==
- National Register of Historic Places listings in Saunders County, Nebraska
