= Prague, Nebraska =

Village in Saunders County, Nebraska, United States

- Village
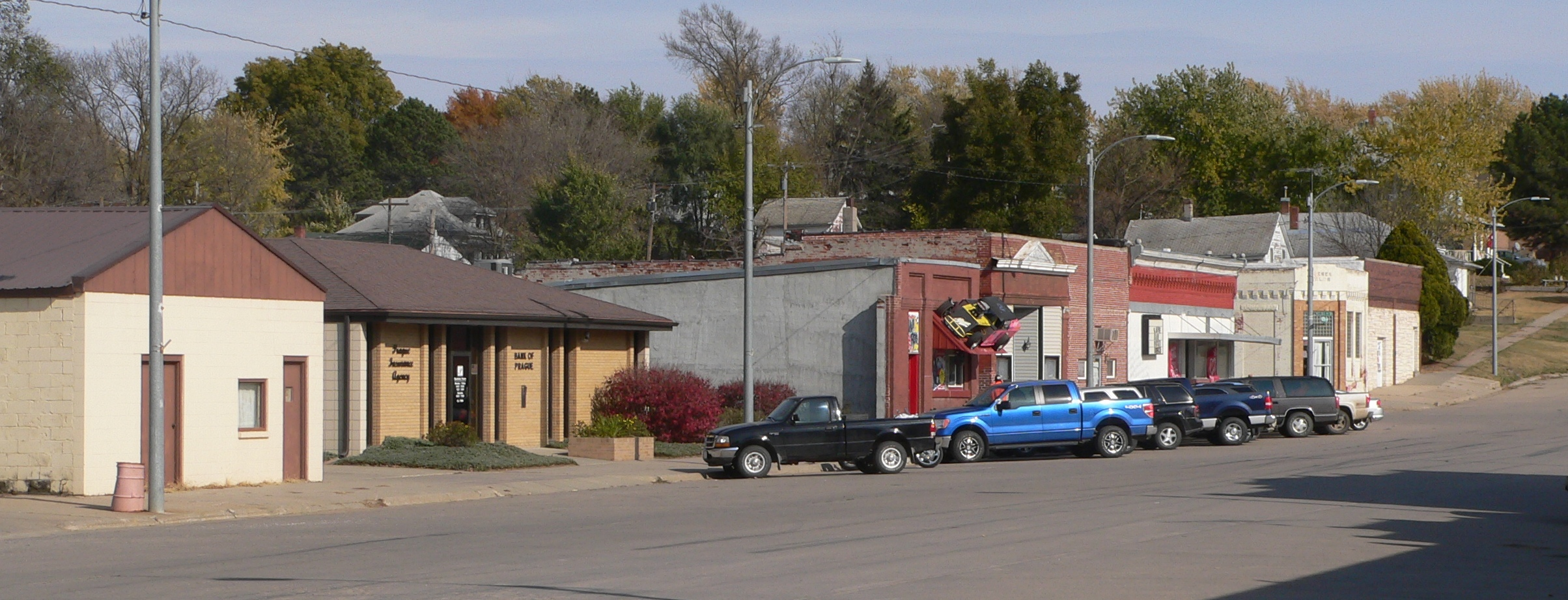
- Downtown Prague

- Location of Prague, Nebraska

- Location within Nebraska Location within the United States
- Coordinates: 41°18′34″N 96°48′29″W
- Country: United States
- State: Nebraska
- County: Saunders
- Township: Elk

Area
  - Total: 0.32 sq mi (0.84 km^{2})
  - Land: 0.32 sq mi (0.84 km^{2})
  - Water: 0 sq mi (0.00 km^{2})
- Elevation: 1,342 ft (409 m)

Population (2020)
  - Total: 291
  - Density: 893.3/sq mi (344.91/km^{2})
- Time zone: UTC-6 (Central (CST))
  - Summer (DST): UTC-5 (CDT)
- ZIP code: 68050
- Area code: 402
- FIPS code: 31-39975
- GNIS feature ID: 2399017
- Website: villageofprague.com

Prague is a village in Saunders County, Nebraska, United States. The population was 291 at the 2020 census. It was named after Prague, capital of Bohemia (now the Czech Republic). However, it is pronounced differently, rhyming with "Craig."

== History ==
Prague was platted in 1887 when the railroad was extended to that point. The fact that a majority of the early settlers were natives of Bohemia caused the name to be selected.

== Geography ==
According to the United States Census Bureau, the village has a total area of 0.31 square miles (0.80 km^{2}), all land.

== Demographics ==
Historical population
Census	Pop.	Note	%±
1890	185		—
1900	324		75.1%
1910	394		21.6%
1920	353		−10.4%
1930	421		19.3%
1940	385		−8.6%
1950	396		2.9%
1960	372		−6.1%
1970	291		−21.8%
1980	285		−2.1%
1990	282		−1.1%
2000	346		22.7%
2010	303		−12.4%
2020	291		−4.0%
U.S. Decennial Census

=== 2010 census ===
As of the census of 2010, there were 303 people, 125 households, and 81 families living in the village. The population density was 977.4 inhabitants per square mile (377.4/km^{2}). There were 154 housing units at an average density of 496.8 per square mile (191.8/km^{2}). The racial makeup of the village was 97.7% White, 1.7% Native American, and 0.7% from two or more races. Hispanic or Latino of any race were 0.7% of the population.

There were 125 households, of which 29.6% had children under the age of 18 living with them, 48.8% were married couples living together, 9.6% had a female householder with no husband present, 6.4% had a male householder with no wife present, and 35.2% were non-families. 33.6% of all households were made up of individuals, and 16.8% had someone living alone who was 65 years of age or older. The average household size was 2.42 and the average family size was 3.01.

The median age in the village was 42.3 years. 22.8% of residents were under the age of 18; 8.3% were between the ages of 18 and 24; 22.8% were from 25 to 44; 26.1% were from 45 to 64; and 20.1% were 65 years of age or older. The gender makeup of the village was 50.5% male and 49.5% female.

=== 2000 census ===
As of the census of 2000, there were 346 people, 136 households, and 91 families living in the village. The population density was 1,261.4 inhabitants per square mile (487.0/km^{2}). There were 149 housing units at an average density of 543.2 per square mile (209.7/km^{2}). The racial makeup of the village was 97.98% White, 0.29% Asian, 0.29% from other races, and 1.45% from two or more races. Hispanic or Latino of any race were 1.16% of the population.

There were 136 households, out of which 33.8% had children under the age of 18 living with them, 58.8% were married couples living together, 5.9% had a female householder with no husband present, and 32.4% were non-families. 30.9% of all households were made up of individuals, and 17.6% had someone living alone who was 65 years of age or older. The average household size was 2.54 and the average family size was 3.24.

In the village, the population was spread out, with 31.2% under the age of 18, 3.5% from 18 to 24, 26.3% from 25 to 44, 17.1% from 45 to 64, and 22.0% who were 65 years of age or older. The median age was 37 years. For every 100 females, there were 98.9 males. For every 100 females age 18 and over, there were 98.3 males.

As of 2000 the median income for a household in the village was $33,393, and the median income for a family was $41,458. Males had a median income of $32,083 versus $19,688 for females. The per capita income for the village was $13,395. About 7.2% of families and 6.9% of the population were below the poverty line, including 10.7% of those under age 18 and none of those age 65 or over.

== Recreation ==
The Czechland Lake Recreation Area is located 1 mile (1.6 km) northwest of Prague.

== Arts and culture ==
Prague is commonly referred to as the home of the world's largest kolach (a Czech pastry), as says the sign along Nebraska Highway 79 when entering the town from the south.

== See also ==
- List of municipalities in Nebraska
