= Cedar Bluffs, Nebraska =

Village in Saunders County, Nebraska, United States

- Village
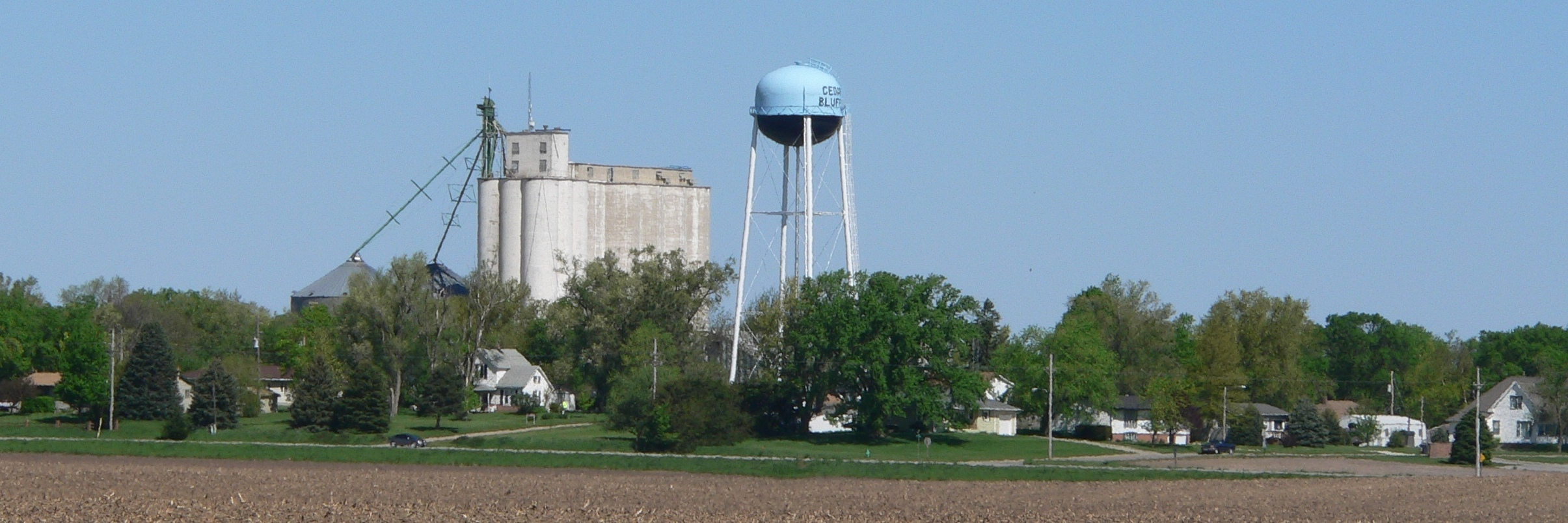
- Cedar Bluffs, looking northwest from Nebraska Highway 109, May 2010

- Location of Cedar Bluffs, Nebraska

- Location within Nebraska Location within the United States
- Coordinates: 41°23′50″N 96°36′35″W
- Country: United States
- State: Nebraska
- County: Saunders
- Township: North Cedar

Area
  - Total: 0.39 sq mi (1.00 km^{2})
  - Land: 0.39 sq mi (1.00 km^{2})
  - Water: 0 sq mi (0.00 km^{2})
- Elevation: 1,296 ft (395 m)

Population (2020)
  - Total: 615
  - Density: 1,589.3/sq mi (613.63/km^{2})
- Time zone: UTC-6 (Central (CST))
  - Summer (DST): UTC-5 (CDT)
- ZIP code: 68015
- Area code: 402
- FIPS code: 31-08150
- GNIS feature ID: 2397579
- Website: cedarbluffsne.gov

Cedar Bluffs is a village in Saunders County, Nebraska, United States. The population was 615 at the 2020 census. Cedar Bluffs was a point on the Mormon, Oregon, and California Trails.

== History ==
Cedar Bluffs was established in 1886 when the Chicago & North Western Railroad was extended to that point. It was named from a prominent river bluff covered with cedar trees.

== Geography ==
According to the United States Census Bureau, the village has a total area of 0.39 square miles (1.01 km^{2}), all land.

== Demographics ==
Historical population
Census	Pop.	Note	%±
1890	181		—
1900	371		105.0%
1910	500		34.8%
1920	516		3.2%
1930	517		0.2%
1940	504		−2.5%
1950	505		0.2%
1960	585		15.8%
1970	616		5.3%
1980	632		2.6%
1990	591		−6.5%
2000	615		4.1%
2010	610		−0.8%
2020	615		0.8%
U.S. Decennial Census

=== 2010 census ===
As of the census of 2010, there were 610 people, 231 households, and 165 families living in the village. The population density was 1,564.1 inhabitants per square mile (603.9/km^{2}). There were 254 housing units at an average density of 651.3 per square mile (251.5/km^{2}). The racial makeup of the village was 96.6% White, 0.8% Native American, 0.2% Asian, 0.8% from other races, and 1.6% from two or more races. Hispanic or Latino of any race were 1.8% of the population.

There were 231 households, of which 36.8% had children under the age of 18 living with them, 55.8% were married couples living together, 10.0% had a female householder with no husband present, 5.6% had a male householder with no wife present, and 28.6% were non-families. 23.4% of all households were made up of individuals, and 12.6% had someone living alone who was 65 years of age or older. The average household size was 2.64 and the average family size was 3.10.

The median age in the village was 39 years. 26.6% of residents were under the age of 18; 8.5% were between the ages of 18 and 24; 22.2% were from 25 to 44; 26.7% were from 45 to 64; and 16.1% were 65 years of age or older. The gender makeup of the village was 51.5% male and 48.5% female.

=== 2000 census ===
As of the census of 2000, there were 615 people, 247 households, and 171 families living in the village. The population density was 1,545.7 inhabitants per square mile (596.8/km^{2}). There were 260 housing units at an average density of 653.5 per square mile (252.3/km^{2}). The racial makeup of the village was 99.02% White, 0.16% African American, 0.49% Native American, and 0.33% from two or more races. Hispanic or Latino of any race were 0.16% of the population.

There were 247 households, out of which 32.4% had children under the age of 18 living with them, 54.7% were married couples living together, 10.5% had a female householder with no husband present, and 30.4% were non-families. 26.7% of all households were made up of individuals, and 10.9% had someone living alone who was 65 years of age or older. The average household size was 2.49 and the average family size was 2.98.

In the village, the population was spread out, with 29.8% under the age of 18, 5.0% from 18 to 24, 25.9% from 25 to 44, 22.8% from 45 to 64, and 16.6% who were 65 years of age or older. The median age was 38 years. For every 100 females, there were 103.6 males. For every 100 females age 18 and over, there were 103.8 males.

As of 2000 the median income for a household in the village was $35,526, and the median income for a family was $39,271. Males had a median income of $30,455 versus $20,227 for females. The per capita income for the village was $14,738. About 4.0% of families and 6.6% of the population were below the poverty line, including 6.5% of those under age 18 and 5.7% of those age 65 or over.

== See also ==
- List of municipalities in Nebraska
