= Colon, Nebraska =

Village in Saunders County, Nebraska, United States

- Village
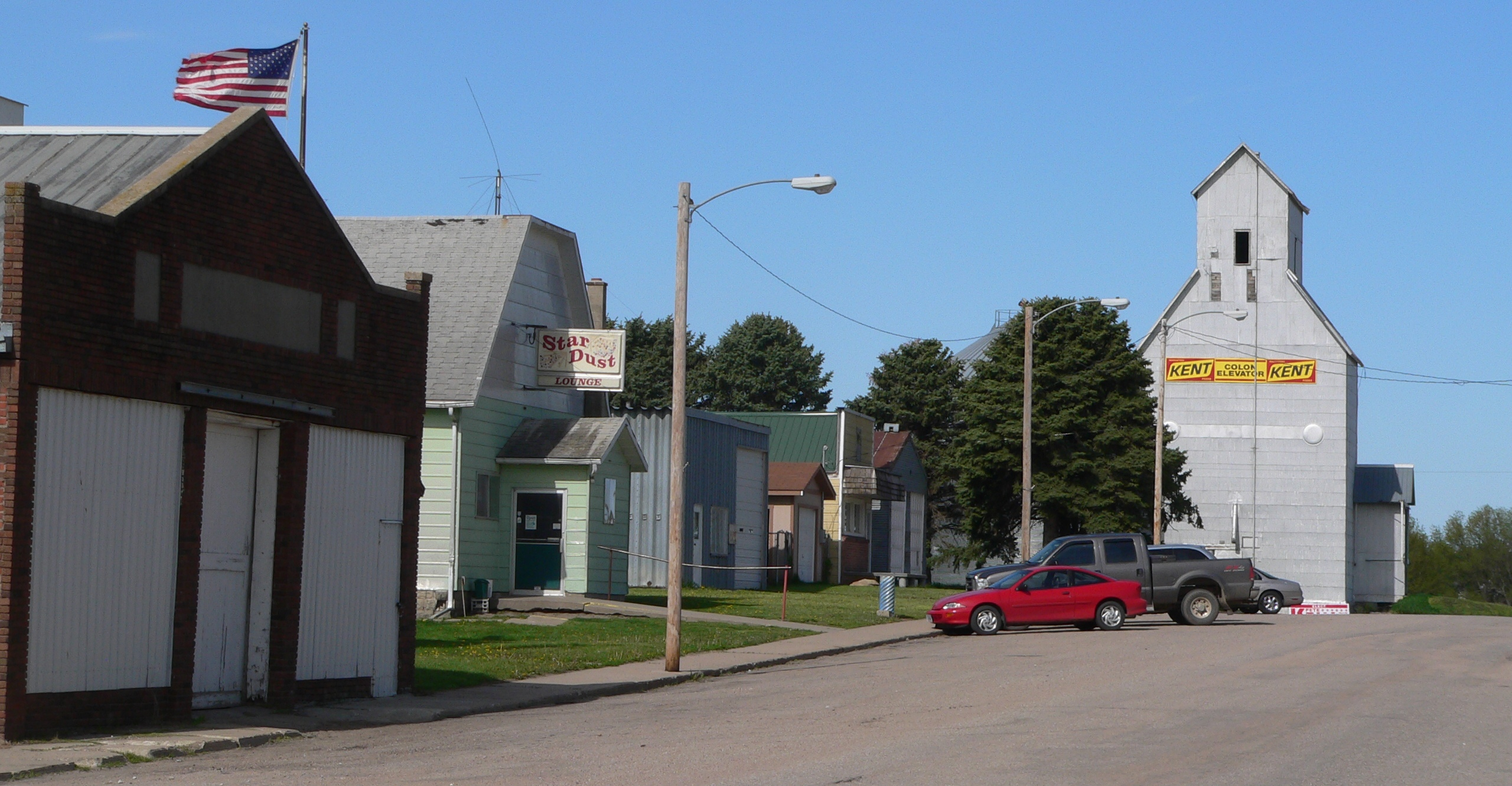
- Downtown Colon: South side of Spruce Street, May 2010

- Location of Colon, Nebraska
- Coordinates: 41°17′53″N 96°36′25″W
- Country: United States
- State: Nebraska
- County: Saunders

Area
  - Total: 0.13 sq mi (0.34 km^{2})
  - Land: 0.13 sq mi (0.34 km^{2})
  - Water: 0 sq mi (0.00 km^{2})
- Elevation: 1,243 ft (379 m)

Population (2020)
  - Total: 107
  - Density: 818.6/sq mi (316.06/km^{2})
- Time zone: UTC-6 (Central (CST))
  - Summer (DST): UTC-5 (CDT)
- ZIP code: 68018
- Area code: 402
- FIPS code: 31-10005
- GNIS feature ID: 2398602

Colon is a village in Saunders County, Nebraska, United States. The population was 107 at the 2020 census. Amenities include a post office and bank branch. Colon is seven miles north of the county seat Wahoo.

== History ==
First established in 1879, Colon removed to its current site in 1886 when the railroad was extended to that point. The town was named after Colon, Michigan, by the first postmaster, who was a native of that state. Colon was incorporated as a village in 1894.

== Geography ==
According to the United States Census Bureau, the village has a total area of 0.13 square miles (0.34 km^{2}), all land.

Colon is five miles (8.0 km) west of U.S. Route 77.

== Demographics ==
Historical population
Census	Pop.	Note	%±
1900	193		—
1910	160		−17.1%
1920	146		−8.7%
1930	126		−13.7%
1940	88		−30.2%
1950	127		44.3%
1960	110		−13.4%
1970	109		−0.9%
1980	148		35.8%
1990	128		−13.5%
2000	138		7.8%
2010	110		−20.3%
2020	107		−2.7%
U.S. Decennial Census

=== 2010 census ===
As of the census of 2010, there were 110 people, 43 households, and 33 families living in the village. The population density was 846.2 inhabitants per square mile (326.7/km^{2}). There were 51 housing units at an average density of 392.3 per square mile (151.5/km^{2}). The racial makeup of the village was 100.0% White.

There were 43 households, of which 27.9% had children under the age of 18 living with them, 62.8% were married couples living together, 4.7% had a female householder with no husband present, 9.3% had a male householder with no wife present, and 23.3% were non-families. 18.6% of all households were made up of individuals, and 9.3% had someone living alone who was 65 years of age or older. The average household size was 2.56 and the average family size was 2.97.

The median age in the village was 44.3 years. 22.7% of residents were under the age of 18; 7.4% were between the ages of 18 and 24; 21.9% were from 25 to 44; 32.7% were from 45 to 64; and 15.5% were 65 years of age or older. The gender makeup of the village was 48.2% male and 51.8% female.

=== 2000 census ===
As of the census of 2000, there were 138 people, 50 households, and 40 families living in the village. The population density was 1,043.5 inhabitants per square mile (402.9/km^{2}). There were 54 housing units at an average density of 408.3 per square mile (157.6/km^{2}). The racial makeup of the village was 99.28% White, and 0.72% from two or more races. Hispanic or Latino of any race were 7.25% of the population.

There were 50 households, out of which 36.0% had children under the age of 18 living with them, 70.0% were married couples living together, 4.0% had a female householder with no husband present, and 20.0% were non-families. 12.0% of all households were made up of individuals, and 8.0% had someone living alone who was 65 years of age or older. The average household size was 2.76 and the average family size was 3.08.

In the village, the population was spread out, with 27.5% under the age of 18, 8.0% from 18 to 24, 22.5% from 25 to 44, 25.4% from 45 to 64, and 16.7% who were 65 years of age or older. The median age was 39 years. For every 100 females, there were 106.0 males. For every 100 females age 18 and over, there were 92.3 males.

As of 2000 the median income for a household in the village was $28,333, and the median income for a family was $28,333. Males had a median income of $40,000 versus $20,417 for females. The per capita income for the village was $17,302. About 11.8% of families and 9.0% of the population were below the poverty line, including 8.8% of under eighteens and none of those over 64.

== Notable people ==
- American lawyer and civil servant Emmett Louis Murphy was born in Colon.

== See also ==
- List of municipalities in Nebraska
