= List of place names of Native American origin in the United States =

Many places throughout the United States take their names from the languages of the indigenous Native American/American Indian tribes. The following list includes settlements, geographic features, and political subdivisions whose names are derived from these languages.

== State names ==
- Alabama – named for the Alibamu, a tribe whose name derives from a Choctaw phrase meaning "thicket-clearers" or "plant-cutters" (from albah, "(medicinal) plants", and amo, "to clear").
- Alaska – from the Aleut phrase alaxsxaq, meaning "the object towards which the action of the sea is directed").
- Arizona – disputed origin; likely from the O'odham phrase ali ṣona-g, meaning "having a little spring".
- Arkansas – from the Illinois rendering of the tribal autonym kką:ze (see Kansas, below), which the Miami and Illinois used to refer to the Quapaw.
- Connecticut – from some Eastern Algonquian language of southern New England (perhaps Mahican), meaning "at the long tidal river" (after the Connecticut River). Campbell suggest an origin from the Mohegan meaning simply "long river".
- Idaho – may be from Plains Apache ídaahę́, "enemy", used to refer to the Comanches, or it may have been an invented word.
- Illinois – from the French rendering of an Algonquian (perhaps Miami) word apparently meaning "s/he speaks normally" (cf. Miami ilenweewa), from Proto-Algonquian *elen-, "ordinary" + -wē, "to speak", referring to the Illiniwek.
- Iowa – from Dakota ayúxba or ayuxwe, via French Aiouez.
- Kansas – from the autonym kką:ze.
- Kentucky – from an Iroquoian word meaning "at the meadow" or "on the prairie" (cf. Seneca gëdá’geh [kẽtaʔkeh], "at the field").
- Massachusetts – from an Algonquian language of southern New England, and apparently means "near the small big mountain", usually identified as Great Blue Hill on the border of Milton and Canton, Massachusetts (cf. the Narragansett name Massachusêuck).
- Michigan – from the Ottawa phrase mishigami, meaning "large water" or "large lake".".
- Minnesota – from the Dakota phrase mni-sota, roughly meaning "cloudy water".
- Mississippi – from an Algonquian language, probably Ojibwe, meaning "big river" (Ojibwe misiziibi).
- Missouri – named for the Missouri tribe, whose name comes from Illinois mihsoori, "dugout canoe".
- Nebraska – from the Chiwere phrase ñįbraske, meaning "flattened water".
- New Mexico – the name "Mexico" comes from Nahuatl Mēxihco, of unknown derivation.
- North Dakota and South Dakota – dakhóta comes from the Sioux word for "friend" or "ally".
- Ohio – from Seneca ohi:yo’, "beautiful river".
- Oklahoma – invented by Chief Allen Wright as a rough translation of "Indian Territory"; in Choctaw, okla means "people", "tribe", or "nation", and homa- means "red", thus: "Red people".
- Tennessee – derived from the name of a Cherokee village, Tanasi, whose etymology is unknown.
- Texas – from the Caddo phrase táyshaʔ, meaning "friend".
- Utah – from a language of one of the Ute tribe's neighbors, such as Western Apache yúdah, "high up".
- Wisconsin – originally "Mescousing", from an Algonquian language, though the source and meaning is not entirely clear; most likely from the Miami word Meskonsing meaning "it lies red" (cf. Ojibwe miskosin).
- Wyoming – from the Munsee Delaware phrase xwé:wamənk, meaning "at the big river flat".

== Delaware ==
=== Settlements ===
- Appoquinimink Hundred
- Hockessin
- Minquadale
- Naamans Gardens – named after a Minqua chief who befriended the settlers of New Sweden.
  - Naamans Creek
- Wawaset Park
- Wyoming – from the Munsee Delaware phrase xwé:wamənk, meaning "at the big river flat".

== District of Columbia ==
=== Settlements ===
- Anacostia – from the Piscataway name Anakwashtank, meaning 'a place of traders'. Originally the name of a village of the Piscataway tribe on the Anacostia River. Also rendered as Nacochtank or Nacostine.
- Takoma – originally the name of Mount Rainier, from Lushootseed [təqʷúbəʔ] (earlier *təqʷúməʔ), 'snow-covered mountain'. The location on the boundary of DC and Maryland was named Takoma in 1883 by DC resident Ida Summy, who believed it to mean 'high up' or 'near heaven'.

=== Bodies of water ===
- Potomac River – from the Piscataway language or the Powhatan language, original form patawomek, meaning 'they bring it' (for trading).

== Florida ==
=== Counties ===
- Alachua County and Alachua – from the Timucuan chua, meaning sinkhole.
- Escambia County
- Manatee County – from Taíno-Kalíña manatí meaning "breast".
- Okaloosa County – from the Choctaw words oka (water) and lusa (black).
- Okeechobee County – from the Hitchiti words oki (water) and chobi (big), a reference to Lake Okeechobee, the largest lake in Florida.
- Osceola County – named after Osceola, the Native American leader who led the Second Seminole War.
- Sarasota County
- Seminole County – named after the Seminole Native American tribe.
- Suwannee County – from Timucua "suwani" meaning "echo river".
  - Suwannee River
- Volusia County
- Wakulla County

=== Settlements ===
- Abacoa – Originally the name of a village of the Jaega tribe.
- Alafaya – After the Alafay people, a sub-group of the Pohoy
- Apalachicola – from Choctaw Apalachee + oklah, "people". Name of the Apalachicola Province.
- Apopka – from probably Seminole Aha, meaning "Potato," and papka, meaning "eating place".
- Hialeah – From Muscogee meaning "pretty prairie".
- Immokalee – from Choctaw(?) im-okli, "his/her home".
- Kissimmee – Disputed meaning, perhaps derived from Ais word "Cacema" meaning "long water".
- Miami – Native American name for Lake Okeechobee and the Miami River, precise origin debated; see also Mayaimi
- Micanopy – named after Seminole chief Micanopy.
- Myakka City – from unidentified Native American language.
- Ocala – from Timucua meaning "Big Hammock".
- Pensacola – from the Choctaw name of a Muskogean group, "hair people", from pashi, "hair" + oklah, "people".
- Steinhatchee – from the Muscogee "hatchee" meaning creek
- Tallahassee – from the name of a Creek town, talahá:ssi, perhaps from (i)tálwa, "tribal town" + ahá:ssi, "old, rancid".
- Tampa – probably from the name of a Calusa village, with no further known etymology.
- Tequesta – named for the Tequesta tribe.
- Thonotosassa – from the Seminole-Creek words thlonto and sasse, meaning the place was a source of valuable flint.
- Wekiva Springs – from Creek word for "spring".

=== Bodies of water ===
- Caloosahatchee River – from Calusa + hatchee, Choctaw for river.
- Loxahatchee River – from Seminole for river of turtles.
- Ocklawaha River - from Creek ak-lowahe for muddy.
- Withlacoochee River – from Creek we (water), thlako (big), and chee (little), or little big water.

=== Other ===
- Paynes Prairie – named after leading chief of the Seminoles King Payne.

== Georgia ==
=== Counties ===
- Catoosa County
- Chattahoochee County
  - Chattahoochee River – a major tributary of the Apalachicola River that makes up the southern half of the Alabama-Georgia border
- Chattooga County
- Cherokee County – named after the Cherokee people.
- Coweta County
- Muscogee County
- Oconee County
- Seminole County

=== Settlements ===
- Cataula – a small community on US 27 in Harris County where 20th century guitar virtuoso Chet Adkins was born
- Centralhatchee
- Chickamauga
- Cusseta
- Dahlonega
- Hiawassee
- Nankipooh – once a whistle stop on the Central of Georgia railroads "R" branch, it is now a suburb of Columbus
- Ochillie – a creek that flows northwest through Chattahoochee county, within the boundaries of the Fort Benning military reservation, and into Upatoi creek
- Savannah
- Schatulga – a small community in western Columbus/Muscogee County
- Tallapoosa
- Toccoa
- Upatoi – a creek that runs between Muscogee and Chattahoochee counties in west-central Georgia
- Unadilla
- Weracoba – a creek and city park in Columbus
- Willacoochee

== Hawaii ==
=== Counties ===
- Hawaii County
- Honolulu County
- Kalawao County
- Kauaʻi County
- Maui County

== Idaho ==
=== Counties ===
- Benewah County
- Caribou County
  - Caribou Mountain
  - Caribou Range
  - Caribou–Targhee National Forest
- Kootenai County
  - Kootenai River
- Latah County
  - Latah Creek
- Minidoka County
- Oneida County
- Owyhee County
  - Owyhee Mountains
  - Owyhee River
  - North Fork Owyhee River
  - Middle Fork Owyhee River
  - South Fork Owyhee River
  - Little Owyhee River
- Shoshone County
  - City of Shoshone
  - Shoshone John Peak
  - Shoshone Falls

=== Settlements ===
- Ahsahka
- Chatcolet
- Cocolalla
- Genesee
- Inkom
- Kamiah
- Kuna
- Lapwai
  - Lapwai Creek
- Minidoka
- Nampa
- Picabo
- Pocatello
- Potlatch
  - Potlatch River
- Tyhee
- Weippe
  - Weippe Prairie

=== Bodies of water ===
- Hoodoo Lake
- Lochsa River
- Pahsimeroi River
- Secesh River
- Spokane River
- Chief Eagle Eye Creek
- Tolo Lake
- Toxaway Lake
- Yuba River

=== Other ===
- Moolack Mountain
- Mount Iowa
- Sacajawea Peaks

== Kansas ==
=== Counties ===
- Chautauqua County
- Cherokee County – named after the Cherokee people.
- Cheyenne County – named after the Cheyenne people.
- Comanche County – named after the Comanche people.
- Kiowa County
- Miami County – named after the Miami people.
- Nemaha County
- Neosho County
- Osage County – named after the Osage people.
  - Osage City
- Ottawa County – named after the Odawa people.
  - City of Ottawa
- Pawnee County – named after the Pawnee people.
- Pottawatomie County – named after the Potawatomi people.
- Shawnee County – named after the Shawnee people.
  - City of Shawnee
- Wabaunsee County
- Wichita County – disputed; from Choctaw, "Big Arbor".Osage, "Scattered Lodges". Kiowa, "Tattooed Faces". Creek, "Barking Water".
  - City of Wichita
- Wyandotte County – named after the Wyandotte people.

=== Settlements ===
- Osawatomie – a compound of two primary Native American Indian tribes from the area, the Osage and Pottawatomie
- Tonganoxie – derives its name from a member of the Delaware tribe that once occupied land in what is now Leavenworth County and western Wyandotte County
- Topeka – from Kansa dóppikʔe, "a good place to dig wild potatoes"

== Kentucky ==
=== Settlements ===
- Kuttawa
- Paducah

=== Other ===
- Cherokee Park – named after the Cherokee people.
- Iroquois Park – The Iroquois Tribe is a federally recognized Native American tribe.
- Shawnee Park – The Shawnee Tribe is a federally recognized Native American tribe.

== Louisiana ==
=== Parishes ===
- Avoyelles Parish – for the Avoyel people
- Caddo Parish – for the Caddo Native Americans
- Calcasieu Parish – means 'crying eagle,' the name of an Atakapa leader
- Catahoula Parish – from a Taensa word meaning 'big, clear lake'
  - Catahoula Lake
- Natchitoches Parish – after the Natchitoches people.
  - Natchitoches
- Ouachita Parish – for the Ouachita River
- Plaquemines Parish – based on the Atakapa word for persimmon, as the early French colonists found persimmon trees growing in the lands near the mouth of the Mississippi River.
  - Plaquemine – town in Iberville Parish, in the vicinity of Bayou Plaquemine Brulé (see above)
  - Bayou Plaquemine Brule – translating as 'burnt persimmon bayou'
- Saint Tammany Parish – for the legendary Native American chief Tamanend
- Tangipahoa Parish – for the Tangipahoa River
  - Tangipahoa, Louisiana – a present-day village in Tangipahoa Parish (see below)
  - Tangipahoa River – for the Tangipahoa tribe, closely related to the Acolapissa people; the name is said to refer to those who grind corn.
- Tensas Parish – for the Taensa people

=== Settlements ===
- Bogalusa
- Houma – for the Houma people; seat of Terrebonne Parish
- Natchez, Louisiana – present-day village in Natchitoches Parish; after the Natchez people
- Opelousas – for the native Appalousa people who formerly occupied the area
- Ponchatoula is a name signifying "falling hair" or "hanging hair" or "flowing hair" from the Choctaw Pashi "hair" and itula or itola "to fall" or "to hang" or "flowing". The Choctaw name Ponchatoula means "flowing hair", arrived at by the Choctaw as a way of expressing the beauty of the location with much moss hanging from the trees. "Ponche" is a Choctaw word meaning location, an object, or a person . See the eponymous Ponchatoula Creek.
- Tickfaw, Louisiana – a present-day village in Tangipahoa Parish (see Tickfaw River)
  - Tickfaw River – appears to have the same linguistic roots as Tangipahoa River.
- Tunica – a community in West Feliciana Parish, for the Tunica people
  - Tunica Hills – a forest region and wildlife management area, also for the Tunica people

=== Bodies of water ===
- Atchafalaya River and Atchafalaya Swamp—from Choctaw language
- Bogue Falaya – tributary of the Tchefuncte River, from the Choctaw words for 'long' and 'river'
- Mississippi River – from the Ojibwe name for the waterway, 'Great River'
- Tchefuncte River – for the historic Tchefuncte culture

== Missouri ==
=== Counties ===
- Mississippi County
- Moniteau County
- Nodaway County
- Osage County
  - City of Osage Beach
- Pemiscot County
- Texas County

=== Settlements ===
- Chilhowee
- Chillicothe
- Koshkonong
- Lake Tapawingo
- Lake Winnebago
- Meramec River
- Miami
- Neosho
- Niangua
  - Niangua River
  - Lake Niangua
- Osceola
- Saginaw
- Sarcoxie
- Seneca
- Shawnee Mac Lakes
- Tallapoosa
- Tarkio
- Tecumseh
- Wasola

=== Others ===
- Ha Ha Tonka State Park

== Montana ==
=== Counties ===
- Missoula County
  - City of Missoula
  - Village of East Missoula

=== Settlements ===
- Absarokee
- Agawam
- Bannack
- Camas
- Charlo
  - Village of Charlo's Heights
- Chinook
- Comanche, named for the Comanche people of the southern plains
- Ekalaka
- Hoosac
- Kalispell, Salish word meaning "flat land above the lake"
- Lima
- Moccasin
- Nashua
- New Miami Colony
- Niarada
- Oswego
- Potomac
- Quebec
- Rocky Boy's Agency named after a Cree chief, Rocky Boy, also known as Stone Child
- Saco
- Saltese
- Saugus
- Shawmut
- Spokane Creek
- Tampico
- Tarkio
- Turah
- Washoe
- Wyola
- Yaak – from a Kootenay word meaning ‘arrow’.
  - Yaak River

=== Bodies of water ===
- Arapooish Pond
- Cherokee Reservoir – named after the Cherokee people.
- Cheyenne Reservoir
- Kootenai River
  - Kootenai National Forest
- Missouri River
  - Little Missouri River
- Navaho Reservoir
- Navajo Tarn
- North Chinook Reservoir
- Sacagawea River
- Shambow Pond
- Shonkin Lake
  - Shonkin Sag
- Shupak Ponds
- Sioux Reservoir
- Slag-a-melt Lakes
- Tahepia Lake
- Tepee Butte Reservoir
  - Tepee Butte
- Tobacco River
- Ute Reservoir
- Waukena Lake
- Wichiup Reservoir
- Wigwam River

=== Other ===
- Absaroka–Beartooth Wilderness
  - Absaroka Range

== Nebraska ==
=== Counties ===
- Cheyenne County - named after the Cheyenne people.
- Dakota County - named after the Dakota people.
- Key Paha County - Means "turtle hill" in Lakota and Dakota, is descriptive of the small hills in its vicinity.
- Nemaha County
- Otoe County
- Pawnee County - named after the Pawnee people.
- Sioux County - named after the Sioux people.

=== Settlements ===
- Anoka - A Dakota Indian word meaning "on both sides."
- Arapahoe
- Hyannis - Named after Hyannis, Massachusetts, which was named after Iyannough, a sachem of the Cummaquid tribe.
- Iowa
- Kenesaw
- Leshara - Named after Chief Petalesharo.
- Mankato - Mankota is from the Dakota Indian word Maḳaṭo, meaning "blue earth". Named for Mankato, Minnesota.
- Minatare - From the Hidatsa word mirita'ri, meaning "crosses the water."
- Monowi - Meaning "flower", this town was so named because there were so many wild flowers growing in the vicinity.
- Nehawka - An approximation to the Omaha and Otoe Indian name of a nearby creek meaning "rustling water."
- Nemaha - Named after the Nemaha River, based on an Otoe word meaning "swampy water."
- Niobrara - The Omaha and Ponca word for spreading water or spreading river.
- Oconee - Named for Oconee, Illinois. Oconee was the name of a Creek town.
- Oconto - A Menominee word meaning the "place of the pickerel." Named for Oconto, Wisconsin.
- Ogallala - named for the Oglala people.
- Omaha - Named for the Omaha people who lived nearby
- Oneida – named after the Oneida people.
- Osceola
- Leshara. Named after Petalesharo, a Pawnee chief.
- Pohocco - A precinct in the northeastern part of Saunders county, the name derives from Pahuk, meaning headland or promontory, the Pawnee name of a prominent hill in the vicinity.
- Ponca
- Quinnebaugh
- Santee
- Sappa
- Saratoga
- Tecumseh
- Tekamah - Located on the site of a historic Pawnee village, the surrounding hills were used for burying grounds and the highest point was used as a fire signal station. The origin of the name is not definitely known.
- Unidilla - An Iroquois word meaning "place of meeting." Named after Unadilla, New York.
- Venango - An eastern Native American name in reference to a figure found on a tree, carved by the Erie.
- Waco - Named after Waco, Texas, which is the name of one of the divisions of the Tawokoni whose village stood on the site of Waco, Texas.
- Wahoo
- Winnebago
- Wyoming - Derived from a corrupted Delaware word meaning "large plains" or "extensive meadows."
- Wyoming Township, Holt County, Nebraska
- Yutan - Named for an Otoe chief.

== Nevada ==
=== Counties ===
- Washoe County
  - Washoe City
  - New Washoe City
  - Washoe Valley

=== Settlements ===
- Cal-Nev-Ari
- Hiko
- Mesquite
- Moapa
  - Moapa Valley
- Owyhee
- Pahrump
- Panaca – derived from the Southern Paiute word Pan-nuk-ker, which means metal, money, and wealth.
- Tonopah
- Winnemucca

=== Bodies of water ===
- Lake Tahoe
  - Lake Tahoe Dam
  - Tahoe Vista
- Tallac Creek
  - Mount Tallac
- Truckee River
  - Upper Truckee River
- Weepah Spring Wilderness

=== Other ===
- Cucomungo Mountains
- Desatoya Mountains
  - Desatoya Peak
- Goshute Mountains
- Ivanpah Valley
- Kamma Mountains
- Kawich Range
- Tamarack Peak
- Toano Range
- East Pahranagat Range

== New Hampshire ==
- Ammonoosuc River (Upper and Lower): (Abnaki) "small, narrow fishing place"
- Amoskeag: (Pennacook) "fishing place" Manchester
- Ashuelot River (and pond): (Pennacook or Natick) "place between"
- Canobie Lake: (Abnaki) "abundant water"
- Contoocook (and river and lake): (Pennacook) "place of the river near pines" or (Abnaki) "nut trees river" or (Natick) "small plantation at the river"
- Coös: (Pennacook) "pine tree"
- Hooksett: (Pennacook) possible abbreviation of Annahooksett "place of beautiful trees"
- Mascoma River (and lake): (Abnaki) "much grass" or "salmon fishing" or "red rocks"
- Massabesic Lake: (Abnaki) "near the great brook"
- Merrimack River (and town)
- Mount Monadnock: (Natick) "at the most prominent island" (-like mountain)
- Mount Moosilauke: (Abnaki) "good moose place" or "at the smooth place"
- Nashua River (and city): (Pennacook/Nipmuck) "between streams"
- Ossipee River (and town and lake): (Abnaki) "beyond the water"
- Paugus Bay: (Abnaki) "small pond"
- Pawtuckaway Lake (and mountains): (Abnaki) "falls in the river" or "clear, shallow river"
- Pemigewasset River: (Abnaki) "extensive rapids"
- Pennacook (village): tribal name; "at the foothills"
- Piscataqua River (Maine border): (Pennacook) "place where the river divides"
- Piscataquog River: (Abnaki) "place where the river divides"
- Souhegan River: (Pennacook or Nipmuck) "watching place"
- Squam Lake (and river): (Abnaki) "salmon"
- Lake Sunapee (and town): (Pennacook) "rocks in the water", "rocky pond"
- Suncook River (also lakes and village): (Pennacook) "rocky place"
- Umbagog Lake: (Abnaki) "clear lake"
- Lake Winnipesaukee (and river): (Pennacook) "land around the lakes" or "good land around lake at mountains"
- Lake Winnisquam: (Abnaki) "salmon-fishing place"

== New Mexico ==
- Jemez Springs – named for the nearby Pueblo of Jemez
- Nambe – Tewa: Nambe Owingeh [nɑ̃̀ŋbèʔ ʔówîŋgè]; Nambé is the Spanish version of a similar-sounding Tewa word, which can be interpreted loosely as meaning "rounded earth."
- Pojoaque – Tewa: P'osuwaege Owingeh [p’òhsũ̀wæ̃̀gè ʔówîŋgè]
- Taos – The English name Taos derives from the native Taos language meaning "place of red willows"
- Tesuque – Tewa: Tetsuge Owingeh [tèʔts’úgé ʔówîŋgè])
- Tucumcari – from Tucumcari Mountain, which is situated nearby. Where the mountain got its name is uncertain. It may have come from the Comanche word tʉkamʉkarʉ, which means 'ambush'. A 1777 burial record mentions a Comanche woman and her child captured in a battle at Cuchuncari, which is believed to be an early version of the name Tucumcari.

== North Dakota ==
=== Counties ===
- Pembina County – an Ojibwa word for viburnum edule, a plant with red berries which grows in the area. Nineteenth-century journal-writers and observers have translated the word as "summer berry" or "high cranberry".
  - City of Pembina
- Sioux County

=== Settlements ===
- Anamoose
- Cayuga
- Grano
- Havana
- Lakota
- Makoti
- Mandan
- Michigan City
- Minnewaukan
- Monango
- Neche
- Nekoma
- Niagara
- Oriska
- Tioga
- Wahpeton

== Ohio ==
=== Counties ===
- Ashtabula County – from Lenape ashtepihəle, 'always enough (fish) to go around, to be given away'; contraction from apchi 'always' + tepi 'enough' + həle (verb of motion).
  - Ashtabula River
- Coshocton County – derived from Unami Lenape Koshaxkink 'where there is a river crossing', probably adapted as Koshaxktun 'ferry' ('river-crossing device').
  - Coshocton
- Cuyahoga County – originally Mohawk Cayagaga 'crooked river', possibly related to kayuha 'creek' or kahyonhowanen 'river'.
  - Cuyahoga River
- Erie County
- Geauga County – Onondaga jyo’ä·gak, Seneca jo’ä·ka’, 'raccoon' (originally the name of the Grand River).
- Hocking County
- Licking County
- Mahoning County
- Miami County
- Muskingum County – Shawnee Mshkikwam 'swampy ground' (mshkikwi- 'swamp' + -am 'earth');
  - Muskingum River
- Ottawa County
- Pickaway County
- Sandusky County – from Wyandot saandusti meaning 'water (within water-pools)' or from andusti 'cold water'.
  - City of Sandusky
  - Sandusky River
- Scioto County – derived from Wyandot skɛnǫ·tǫ’, 'deer' (compare Shenandoah, also derived from the word for deer in a related Iroquoian language).
  - Scioto River
- Seneca County
- Tuscarawas County – after the Iroquoian Tuscarora people, who at one time had a settlement along the river of that name.
  - Tuscarawas River
- Wyandot County

=== Settlements ===
- Chillicothe – from Shawnee Chala·ka·tha, referring to members of one of the five divisions of the Shawnee people: Chalaka (name of the Shawnee group, of unknown meaning) + -tha 'person'; the present Chillicothe is the most recent of seven places in Ohio that have held that name, because it was applied to the main town wherever the Chalakatha settled as they moved to different places.
- Conneaut – probably derived from Seneca ga-nen-yot, 'standing stone'.
- Mingo and Mingo Junction – named after the Mingo people, Iroquoians who moved west to Ohio in the 18th century, largely of the Seneca nation.
- Ohio River – from Seneca Ohiyo 'the best river' or 'the big river'.
- Olentangy – an Algonquian name, probably from Lenape ulam tanchi or Shawnee holom tenshi, both meaning 'red face paint from there'. The Vermilion River likewise was named with a translation of the original Ottawa name Ulam Thipi, 'red face paint river'.
- Piqua – Shawnee Pekowi, name of one of the five divisions of the Shawnee.
- Wapakoneta – from Shawnee Wa·po’kanite 'Place of White Bones' (wa·pa 'white'+(h)o’kani 'bone'+-ite locative suffix).

== Oregon ==
=== Counties ===
- Clackamas Counties, named after the Clackamas tribe.
- Clatsop County, named after the Clatsop people.
- Coos County, named after the Coos people.
- Klamath County, named after the Klamath people.
- Multnomah County named after the Multnomah people.
- Tillamook County, named after the Tillamook people.
- Umatilla County, Sahaptin word, possibly meaning "laughing waters".
- Wallowa County, from the Nez Perce word "wallowa" to designate a tripod of poles used to support fish nets.
- Wasco County, named after the Wasco people.
- Yamhill County, named after the Yamhela people.

=== Communities ===
- Alsea/Alsea River, named for the Alsea people
- Clatskanie, a place on the Nehalem River
- Coos Bay
- Depoe Bay, named for a local Indian
- Klamath, multiple places named for the Klamath Tribes
- Multnomah Falls
- Nehalem, multiple places named for the Nehalem people
- Scappoose, means "gravelly plain" in an unknown native language
- Siletz, means crooked river in the language of the Siletz people
- Tualatin, multiple places named for the Tualatin people
- Umatilla, multiple places named for the Umatilla people
- Umpqua, multiple places named for the Umpqua people
- Willamette, multiple places from the Clackamas name for the Columbia River
- Yachats/Yachats River, uncertain origin
- Yamhill, multiple places named for a band of the Kalapuya people

== Pennsylvania ==
=== Counties ===
- Allegheny County – probably from Lenape welhik hane
  - Allegheny River
- Juniata County – from onoyutta, 'standing stone' in an Iroquoian language, probably Susquehannock.
  - Juniata River
- Lackawanna County – Lenape laxaohane 'fork of a river'
  - Lackawanna River
- Lehigh County – anglicisation of the Lenape name for the river, lechewuekink, which means "where there are forks".
- Lycoming County – from Lenape lekawink 'place of sand' or lekawi hane 'sandy stream', from lekaw 'sand'.
- Susquehanna County
- Tioga County – Onondaga, 'At the forks.'
- Venango County – From Lenape 'Onange,' meaning 'a mink.'
- Wyoming County

=== Settlements ===
- Aliquippa – Lenape alukwepi 'hat'; after Queen Aliquippa, who was named that because she wore a large hat.
- Analomink – From "tumbling water."
- Catasauqua (pronounced "Cat-uh-SAW-kwuh"), from the Lenape language, meaning "dry ground" or "thirsty ground."
- Catawissa – Lenape, 'growing fat;' a reference to a Delaware Chief in the area, Lapachpeton.
- Chillisquaque Chillisquaque' comes from the native American term meaning 'song of the wild goose'
- Conemaugh – Lenape kwənəmuxkw 'otter'.
- Connoquenessing – Lenape, 'A long way straight'
- Conshohocken – Lenape kanshihakink 'in elegant land': kanshi 'elegant' + haki 'land' + -nk locative suffix.
- Coplay - This name came from "Kolapechka". The son of the Indian chief, Paxanosa, who lived at the head of the creek
- Hokendauqua (Lehigh County) Both the village and creek are named for a combination of the Lenape words Hackiun and dochwe, which together mean "stream searching for land."
- Keewaydin Keewaydin is not definite, but may have derived from an Indian word meaning "the north wind" or "home wind," (for when the wind blew from that direction the trail led home).
- Kingsessing – The name Kingsessing or Chinsessing comes from the Delaware word for "a place where there is a meadow".
- Kiskiminetas – derived from Lenape kishku manitu 'make daylight' (kishku 'day' + manitu 'make' ), a command to warriors to break camp and go on maneuvers while it is still night (as though it were daylight), according to John Heckewelder.
- Kittanning – Lenape kithanink 'on the main river': kit 'great, large, big' + hane 'swift river from the mountains' + -ink locative suffix, "the big river" or "the main river" being an epithet for the Allegheny-cum-Ohio, according to John Heckewelder.
- Lackawaxen Lenape name Lackawaxen, meaning "swift waters,"
- Loyalhanna – after the name of a Lenape town, Layalhanning, meaning 'at the middle of the river': layel or lawel 'middle' + hane 'river' + -ink locative suffix.
- Loyalsock – Lenape, 'middle creek.' (It is located halfway between lycoming and muncy creeks.)
- Macungie is derived from a Native American word meaning bear swamp, or place where bears feed.
- Manayunk – Lenape məneyunk 'place of drinking': məne 'drink' + yu 'here' + -nk locative suffix.
- Mauch Chunk – Lenape maxkw-chunk 'bear mountain'.
- Mehoopany – Lenape, 'where there are wild potatoes."
- Meshoppen Lenape, 'corals,' or 'beads.'
- Monongahela – Lenape Mənaonkihəla 'the high riverbanks are washed down; the banks cave in or erode', inanimate plural of mənaonkihəle 'the dirt caves off (such as the bank of a river or creek; or in a landslide)' < mənaonke 'it has a loose bank (where one might fall in)' + -həle (verb of motion).
- Moshnanon The community takes its name from Moshannon Creek, a Native American name purported to mean "moose stream"
- Muckinipattis – Lenape for 'deep running water', from mexitkwek 'a deep place full of water' or mexakwixen 'high water, freshet'.
- Muncy–after the Munsee people < Munsee language mənsiw, 'person from Minisink' (minisink meaning 'at the island': mənəs 'island' + -ink locative suffix) + -iw attributive suffix.
- Nanticoke – From the Nanticoke language, 'Tide water people.' (In reference to themselves)
- Nemacolin – after the 18th-century Lenape chief Nemacolin.
- Nescopeck – Shawnee, 'deep and still water.'
- Nesquehoning — meaning “narrow valley;” others say name comes from stream that runs through the area, which was called Neska-honi, or black lick, or Neskeu-honi, or dirty lick
- Nittany – 'single mountain', from Lenape nekwti 'single' + ahtəne 'mountain'.
- Ohiopyle – from the Lenape phrase ahi opihəle, 'it turns very white', referring to the frothy waterfalls.
- Passyunk – from Lenape pahsayunk 'in the valley', from pahsaek 'valley' (also the name of Passaic, New Jersey).
- Pennypack–Lenape pənəpekw 'where the water flows downward'.
- Perkiomen – Lenape, 'where there are cranberries.'
- Poconos – Lenape pokawaxne 'a creek between two hills'.
- Punxsutawney – Lenape Punkwsutenay 'town of sandflies or mosquitoes': punkwəs 'sandfly' (<punkw 'dust' + -əs diminutive suffix) + utenay 'town'.
- Pymatuning – Lenape Pimhatunink 'where there are facilities for sweating' < pim- 'to sweat in a sweat lodge' + hatu 'it is placed' + -n(e) inanimate object marker + -ink locative suffix.
- Queonemysing – Lenape kwənamesink 'place of long fish': kwəni 'long' + names 'fish' + -ink locative suffix.
- Quittapahilla Creek – Lenape kuwe ktəpehəle 'it flows out through the pines': kuwe 'pine tree' + ktəpehəle 'it flows out'.
- Shackamaxon – Lenape sakimaksink 'place of the chiefs': sakima 'chief' + -k plural suffix + -s- (for euphony) -ink locative suffix
- Shamokin – Lenape Shahəmokink 'place of eels', from shoxamekw 'eel' + -ink locative suffix.
- Shickshinny – Lenape, 'a fine stream.'
- Sinnemahoning – Lenape ahsəni mahonink 'stony lick', from ahsən 'stone' and mahonink 'at the salt lick'.
- Susquehanna – Lenape siskuwihane 'muddy river': sisku 'mud' + -wi- (for euphony) + hane 'swift river from the mountains'.
- Tamaqua – Lenape, 'running water;' named for a nearby river.
- Tiadaghton – Seneca, 'pine creek.'
- Tinicum – Lenape mahtanikunk 'Where they catch up with each other'.
- Tulpehocken – Lenape tulpehakink 'in the land of turtles': tulpe 'turtle' + haki 'land' + -nk locative suffix.
- Tionesta – Munsee, 'There it has fine banks.'
- Tobyhanna is derived from an American Indian word meaning "a stream whose banks are fringed with alder."
- Towamensing – Lenape, 'pasture land,' (literally 'the place of feeding cattle.')
- Towanda – Nanticoke, 'where we bury the dead.'
- Tunkhannock – Lenape tank hane 'narrow stream', from tank 'small' + hane 'stream'.
- Wapwallopen – Lenape òphalahpink, 'where the white wild hemp grows,' from òp- 'white' + halahpis 'Indian hemp' + -nk locative.
- Wiconisco – Lenape wikin niskew 'A muddy place to live', from wikin 'to live in a place' + niskew 'to be dirty, muddy'.
- Wissahickon – contraction of Lenape wisamekwhikan 'catfish creek': wisamekw 'catfish' (literally 'fat fish': <wisam 'fat' + -èkw, bound form of namès 'fish') + hikan 'ebb tide, mouth of a creek'.
- Wyalusing – Lenape, 'the place where the aged man dwells,' a reference to the Moravian missionaries who set up a village in the area.
- Wyoming Valley – Munsee, xwēwamənk 'at the big river flat': xw- 'big' + ēwam 'river flat' + ənk locative suffix.
- Wysox – Lenape, 'the place of grapes.'
- Youghiogheny – Lenape yuxwiakhane 'stream running a contrary or crooked course', according to John Heckewelder.

== Rhode Island ==
- Apponaug: (Narragansett) "where oysters/shellfish are roasted" or "waiting place"
- Aquidneck Island: (Narragansett) "at the island"
- Canonchet: a 17th-century Narragansett chief
- Chepachet: (Narragansett) "boundary/separation place"
- Conanicut Island: (Narragansett) named for a 17th-century chief Canonicus
- Conimicut: (Narragansett) thought to be named for granddaughter of Canonicus (see above)
- Mount Hope: (from Narragansett Montop or Montaup) "look-out place" or "well-fortified island"
- Narragansett Bay (and town): tribe: "at the narrow point"
- Natick: tribe; "the place I seek" or "home"
- Pascoag (and river): (Nipmuck) "the dividing place" (of river)
- Pawtucket: (Narragansett) "at the falls in the river (tidal stream)"
- Pettaquamscutt Rock (and river): Narragansett) "at the round rock"
- Pontiac: famous mid-18th century Ottawa chief
- Quonochontaug: (Narragansett) "home of the blackfish"
- Sakonnet River (and point): (Narragansett) "home of the black goose"
- Scituate Reservoir: (Wampanoag) "at the cold spring/brook"
- Shawomet: (Narragansett) "at the peninsula/neck" (canoe-landing place)
- Usquepaugh: (Narragansett) "at the end of the pond"
- Weekapaug: (Narragansett) "at the end of the pond"
- Woonsocket: (Nipmuck) "place of steep descent"
- Wyoming: (Delaware) "large prairie"

== South Carolina ==
=== Counties ===
- Cherokee County – named after the Cherokee people.
- Oconee County
- Saluda County
  - Saluda River

=== Settlements ===
- Seneca

=== Bodies of water ===
- Ashepoo River
- Coosawhatchie River
- Lake Jocassee
- Lake Keowee
- Lake Toxaway
- Santee River
- Stono River
- Wando River

=== Islands ===
- Edisto Island
- Kiawah Island
- Wadmalaw Island

== South Dakota ==
=== Counties ===
* Brule County - from the Sičangu or Brule from French meaning “burnt” due to the name ‘Sičangu’ meaning burnt thighs in Lakota.
- Minnehaha County – from Dakota mniȟáȟa, meaning "waterfall".
- Oglala Lakota County – Lakota for "to scatter one's own".
- Yankton County – corruption of Sioux Ihanktonwan, meaning "the end village".

=== Settlements ===
- Canistota – from the New York Native American word canistoe, meaning "board on the water".
- Capa – from the Sioux for "beaver".
- Kadoka – Lakota for "hole in the wall".
- Kampeska – Sioux for "bright and shining", "like a shell or glass".
- Lower Brule - from the Lower Brule Sioux Tribe, which the tribe is headquartered.
- Oacoma
- Oglala – Lakota for "to scatter one's own".
- Ottumwa – Algonquian word possibly meaning "rippling waters", "place of perseverance or self-will", or "town".
- Owanka – Lakota for "good camping ground". It was originally named Wicota, a Lakota word meaning "a crowd".
- Pukwana – the name given to the smoke emitted from a Native American peace pipe.
- Ree Heights – named after the Arikara people, sometimes known as the Ree. Arikara may have been a neighboring tribe's word for "horns" or "male deer".
- ]]SansArc, South Dakota|Sans Arc] - from the Sans Arc, a Lakota tribe whose name comes from French, meaning “without bows” a translate from their Lakota name “Itazipčo” meaning “no bows”.
- Seneca – from Algonquian sinnekaas, which referred to the Seneca people.
- Sisseton - from Dakota “Sisíthuŋwaŋ”, the original name for the Sisseton, a sub-tribe who lived in the area, of which currently is encompassed by the Lake Traverse Reservation, their current tribal lands as the Sisseton Wahpeton Oyate .
- Teton – from Lakota tiunwan, meaning "prairie dwellers".
- Wanblee – from Lakota Waŋblí Hoȟpi, meaning "golden eagle nest".
- Wasta – from Dakota wašté, meaning "good".
- Wakonda – from Sioux wakan, meaning "wonder, marvel, mystery, sacred".
- Wakpala - from Lakota”wakpala”, meaning “creek”.
- Wecota – from Lakota wicota, meaning "a crowd".
- Wetonka from Dakota wi-tȟáŋka, meaning "big sun".
- Yankton – corruption of Sioux Ihanktonwan, meaning "the end village".

== Tennessee ==
=== Counties ===
- Sequatchie County – Cherokee word believed to mean, "opossum, he grins or runs".
  - Village of Sequatchie
  - Sequatchie River
  - Little Sequatchie River
  - Sequatchie Valley
- Unicoi County – Native American word for the southern Appalachian Mountains, probably meaning "white" or "fog-draped"
  - Town of Unicoi
  - Unicoi Range

=== Settlements ===
- Atoka
- Bogota
- Bolivar
- Bybee
- Chattanooga – based on cvto, a Muskogean term for 'rock'
- Cherokee
  - Cherokee Hills
  - Cherokee National Forest
- Chewalla
- Chilhowee Park
  - Chilhowee Dam
- Conasauga (McMinn County)
  - Conasauga (Polk County)
- Cotula
- Culleoka
- Etowah – Muskogean term for 'town'
- Jalapa
- Lake Tansi Village
- Mohawk
- Montezuma
- Niota
- Ocoee
- Oneida – named after the Oneida people.
- Ooltewah – variation of eh-DOH-wah, Muskogean term for 'town'
- Ottway
- Pocahontas
  - Pocahontas (Coffee County)
- Quebeck
- Sango
- Savannah – named for a clan of Shawnee whose native name was Ša·wano·ki (literally, "southerners")
- Sewanee – located on top of the southern end of the Cumberland Plateau, assumed to be a variant of the Algonquian tribal name Shawnee, or a contraction of Haudenosaunee referring to the northern Iroquois or eastern Tuscarora.
- Tallassee
- Tennessee City
  - Village of Tennessee Ridge
  - Tennessee River
  - Little Tennessee River
- Tullahoma – Choctaw for 'red rock' (tali – rock, homma – red)
- Tusculum
  - Tusculum Place
- Watauga
  - Watauga River
- Yuma

=== Bodies of water ===
- Chickamauga Creek
  - Chickamauga Lake
- Conasauga River
  - Conasauga Creek
- Hatchie River
- Hiwassee River
- Loosahatchie River
- Nolichucky River
- Nonconnah Creek
- Obey River
- Toccoa River
- Tuscumbia River

== Texas ==
- Nacogdoches – from Caddo language, Nacogdoche tribe of the Caddo
- Quanah – named for the Comanche Chief, Quanah Parker
- Waco – from Wichita [wiːko], the name of a tribal subgroup, the Waco people.

== Utah ==
- Juab County – from Paiute word for "flat plain"
- Kanab – from Paiute word for willow tree
- Kamas – from indigenous word for an edible, wild bulb
- Moab – from Paiute "moapa," meaning "mosquitoes", though possibly named after the biblical Moab
- Oquirrh Mountains – from Goshute for "glowing, or wooded mountain"
- Mount Timpanogos – from Paiute for "rocks and runny water"
- Sanpete County - Chief Sanpitch
- Uintah County – from Ute for "pine land"
- Utah County, Utah Lake, etc. – "Utah" via "Yudah" or "Yutah" from a language of one of the Ute tribe's neighbors, such as Western Apache yúdah, "high up".
- Wasatch (Wasatch Range, Wasatch County, Wasatch Plateau, Wahsatch, etc.) – from "wasatch," a Ute word for "mountain pass" or "low pass over high range"
- Various municipal street names including Arapeen Drive ("Arapeen" was a notable 19th-century Paiute), Chipeta Way ("chipeta" is Ute for "rippling water") and Wasatch Boulevard ("wasatch" is Ute for "mountain pass").

== Vermont ==
=== Settlements ===
- Mount Ascutney (and village): (Abnaki) "at the end of the river fork"
- Lake Bomoseen (and town): (Abnaki) "keeper of ceremonial fire"
- Jamaica: (Natick) "beaver"
- Passumpsic River (and village): (Abnaki) "flowing over clear, sandy bottom"
- Pompanoosuc: abbreviation of Ompompanoosuc
- Quechee: abbreviation of Ottauquechee
- Winooski River (and city): (Abnaki) "wild onions"

=== Bodies of Water ===
- Hoosic River
- Lake Iroquois: (Abnaki-French) "real adders" (describing western enemies of Abnaki)
- Maquam Bay
- Lake Memphremagog: (Abnaki) "where there is great expanse of water"
- Mettawee River
- Missisquoi River: tribal name
- Nulhegan River: (Abnaki) "log trap" or "deadfall"
- Ompompanoosuc River: (Abnaki) "mushy/quaky land"
- Ottauquechee River: (uncertain – Natick?) "swift mountain stream"
- Walloomsac River

=== Islands ===
- Popasquash Island
- Queneska Island: (Abnaki) "elbow" or "long joint"

=== Other ===
- Hoosac Mountains: (Mahican) "stone place"
- Monadnock Mountain: (Abnaki) "at the mountain which sticks up like an island" (see New Hampshire)
- Moosalamoo Mountain: (Abnaki) "moose trail"
- Netop Mountain: (Natick) "my friend"
- Nickwaket Mountain: (Abnaki) "at the fork" or "home of squirrels"
- Pico Peak: (possibly Abnaki) "the pass/opening"

== Washington ==
- Alki Beach
- Chehalis, Chehalis River
- Chelan, Chelan County, Lake Chelan – a Salish language word, Tsi – Laan, meaning "Deep Water"
- Chiwawa River
- Chinook, Chinook Pass
- Cle Elum, Cle Elum River
- Copalis Beach, Copalis Crossing
- Cowlitz County, Cowlitz River
- Dosewallips River
- Duckabush River
- Duwamish River
- Entiat, Entiat River
- Hamma Hamma River
- Hoh River
- Hoquiam
- Humptulips, Humptulips River
- Hyak
- Issaquah
- Kachess Lake
- Kahlotus Hole in the Ground
- Kalaloch
- Kitsap Peninsula, Kitsap County – named after Chief Kitsap
- Kittitas County, Kittitas
- La Push – lapoos or labush is the Chinook Jargon adaptation of the fr. la bouche ("mouth")
- Neah Bay
- Nespelem
- Nisqually River
- Nooksack River
- Okanogan
- Omak
- Orondo
- Palouse
- Pasayten River, Pasayten Wilderness
- Puyallup
- Pysht River
- Sammamish
- Seattle – named after Chief Seattle, whose Lushootseed name was Siʔáł
- Sequim
- Skagit River
- Skookumchuck River
- Snoqualmie, Snoqualmie Pass, Snoqualmie River
- Skykomish River
- Snohomish – Lushootseed [sduhúbʃ], the name of a Salishan group (earlier *snuhúmʃ)
- Sol Duc River
- Spokane – from the Spokane dialect of Interior Salish spoqín
- Squaxin Island
- Stehekin
- Stillaguamish River
- Suquamish
- Tacoma – from Lushootseed [təqʷúbəʔ] (earlier *təqʷúməʔ), "snow-covered mountain"
- Tillicum
- Tonasket
- Toppenish
- Tulalip Bay
- Tumwater – city in Thurston County – "Fast Water / Waterfall"
- Tukwila, Washington
- Twisp, Twisp River
- Wapato
- Wenatchee, Wenatchee River
- Wishkah River
- Walla Walla
- Yakima

== Wyoming ==
- Cheyenne – From Lakota Šahíyela, the diminutive of Šahíya, "Cree", meaning roughly “different speakers”.
- The name "Wyoming" comes from a Delaware Tribe word Mechaweami-ing or "maughwauwa-ma", meaning large plains or extensive meadows, which was the tribe's name for a valley in northern Pennsylvania. The name Wyoming was first proposed for use in the American West by Senator Ashley of Ohio in 1865 in a bill to create a temporary government for Wyoming Territory.
- Pahaska Tepee- From Lakota “White Mountain Tepee”. Situated 2 miles east of Yellowstone National Park.
- Popo Agie River – From the Absalooke or Crow Language Poppootcháashe, which means "Plopping River" for the sound the water makes when it comes out of the sinkhole in Sinks Canyon, near present Lander, Wyoming.

== See also ==
- List of placenames of indigenous origin in the Americas
- List of federally recognized tribes by state: As of May 2013, there were 566 Native American tribes legally recognized by the U.S. Government, according to the article, "List of federally recognized tribes."
- Native Americans in the United States
