= Teton =

Teton or The Tetons may refer to:

- Teton Basin or Teton Valley, today's names of historic trapper meeting and battle site (1832)
- Teton Range, part of the Rocky Mountains in Wyoming
  - Grand Teton, the tallest mountain in the Teton Range
    - Grand Teton National Park, the United States National Park situated around the range
  - Teton Pass, a high mountain pass located at the southern end of the Teton Range
- Teton River (Idaho), a river near the Teton Range
  - Teton Dam, a dam in the Teton River that collapsed soon after it was built
- Teton River (Montana)
- Teton Sioux Indian Tribe or Titonwan and Lakota
- Teton Gravity Research

== Places ==
- Teton, Idaho
- Teton, South Dakota
- Teton County, Montana
- Teton County, Idaho
- Teton County, Wyoming

== People ==
- Carrie Cornplanter (1887–1918), Seneca name "Téton," artist active in the 1900s
