= Moolack Mountain =

Moolack Mountain can refer to two mountains in the United States:

- Moolack Mountain (Idaho), in Boise County
- Moolack Mountain (Oregon), in Lane County

== See also ==
- Moolock Mountain, in King County, Washington
