= Wasatch =

The Wasatch Range or Wasatch Mountains is a mountain range in the western United States.

Wasatch may also refer to:

== Places ==
- Wasatch Back, a region in northern Utah immediately east of the Wasatch Range
- Wasatch County, Utah, a county in north central Utah
- Wasatch Front, a region in northern Utah immediately west of the Wasatch Range
- Wasatch National Forest, a former National Forest in northern Utah
  - Wasatch-Cache National Forest or Uinta-Wasatch-Cache National Forest, combined National Forest
- Wasatch Formation, a geologic formation in Wyoming
- Wasatch Mountain (Colorado), a summit near Telluride, Colorado
- Wasatch Plateau, a plateau in central Utah, part of the Colorado Plateau
- Wahsatch, Utah, a ghost town in Summit County, Utah

== Other uses ==
- Wasatch Wave, a weekly newspaper in Heber City, Utah, started in 1889
- Wasatch Academy, a boarding school in Mount Pleasant, Utah
- "WASATCH", aviation call sign for the former Morris Air airline
- "Caution - Wasatch Style", an acoustic rendition of "Caution" by the Killers from the deluxe edition of Imploding the Mirage, 2021

== See also ==
- Wasatch desertparsley (Lomatium bicolor), an herb of the family Apiaceae
- Wasatch fleabane (Erigeron arenarioides), a species of flowering plant in the daisy family
- Wasatch Elementary (disambiguation)
