= Ottumwa =

Ottumwa may refer to:

- Ottumwa, Iowa
- Ottumwa, Kansas
- Ottumwa, South Dakota
- Ottumwa (YTB-761), a United States Navy large harbor tug named for Ottumwa, Iowa
- Ottumwa (crater), an impact crater on Mars named after Ottumwa, Iowa
