= Keewaydin =

Keewaydin can refer to:

- Keewaydin (camp), Ontario, Canada
- Keewaydin Club, on Keewaydin Island
- Keewaydin Island, Florida
- Keewaydin State Park, New York
- Keewaydin, Minneapolis
- Keewaydin, a community in Covington Township, Clearfield County, Pennsylvania

== See also ==
- The Song of Hiawatha by Henry Wadsworth Longfellow, in which the northwest wind is called Keewaydin
