= Hilton (Catonsville, Maryland) =

Historic house in Maryland, United States

- U.S. National Register of Historic Places
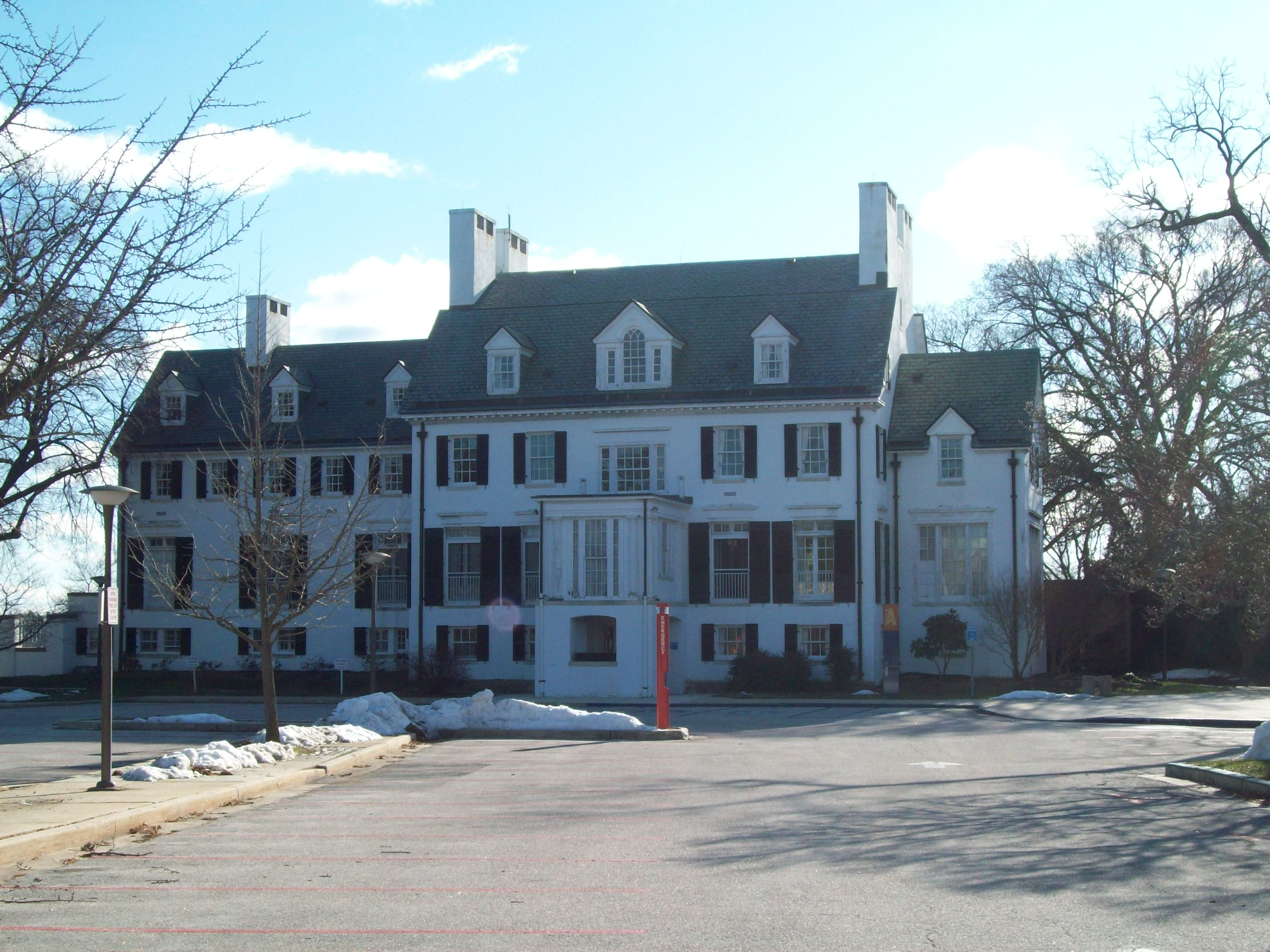
- Hilton, December 2009

- Location within Maryland Location within the United States
- Location: 800 S. Rolling Rd., Catonsville, Maryland
- Coordinates: 39°15′9″N 76°44′1″W
- Area: less than one acre
- Built: 1825
- Architect: Palmer, Edward
- Architectural style: Colonial Revival, Georgian Revival
- NRHP reference No.: 80001794
- Added to NRHP: October 31, 1980

Hilton is a historic home located on the campus of the Community College of Baltimore County in Catonsville, Baltimore County, Maryland. It is an early-20th-century Georgian Revival–style mansion created from a stone farmhouse built about 1825, overlooking the Patapsco River valley. The reconstruction was designed by Baltimore architect Edward L. Palmer Jr. in 1917. The main house is five bays in length, two and a half stories above a high ground floor, with a gambrel roof. The house has a 2 1/2-story wing, five bays in length, with a gabled roof, extending from the east end; and a two-story, one-bay west wing. The roof is covered with Vermont slate. The house features a small enclosed porch of the Tuscan order that was probably originally considered a porte cochere.

Hilton is situated on the 5000-acre "Taylor's Forest" surveyed in 1678. The first construction at the 511-acre site was a stone farmhouse built between 1818 and 1825 for James W. McCulloh. After defending several charges of conspiracy, the property was sold to John Lewis Buchanan in 1825. In 1827 Dr. Lennox Birckhead, son of McCulloh's business partner Soloman Birkhead, purchased the property. Birkhead named his home "Hilton" for its high elevation.

William Carson Glenn purchased the property in 1837, selling to his politician brother John Glenn in 1842. Guests during this period included Robert E. Lee. In 1852, Glenn added several stone outbuildings. The property passed to Marrietta Glen and was managed by newspaper publisher William Wilkens Glenn. William Glenn managed the farm with 26 slaves, sympathizing with the South during the Civil War. Hilton was used as a stopping location for Southerners fleeing Union troops for home. Glenn died in 1876, with the farm falling into disuse. In 1905 the estate was subdivided into 25 lots. In 1907 43 acres were donated by Russell Sage Foundation director John Mark Glenn (1858–1950) to create the first section of Patapsco Valley State Park. Hilton was purchased in 1917 by National Enameling and Stamping Company owner George Worth Knapp as a summer home and dairy farm reassembling 105 acres of the estate. In 1962 Baltimore County Public Schools purchased the property to establish a Community College of Baltimore County branch. In the 1970s lecture halls occupied the mansion. In 2011, a grant was awarded to renovate the building as the Center for Global Education.

In addition to the Hilton Mansion, several other slavery-era outbuildings are on the property: two Tudor style stone houses built in 1852, of which one is in ruins; an 1852 stone bowling alley in ruins; and a stone gardeners building.

It was listed on the National Register of Historic Places in 1980.
