= Lake Drive Apartments =

Historic building in Maryland, USA

- U.S. National Register of Historic Places
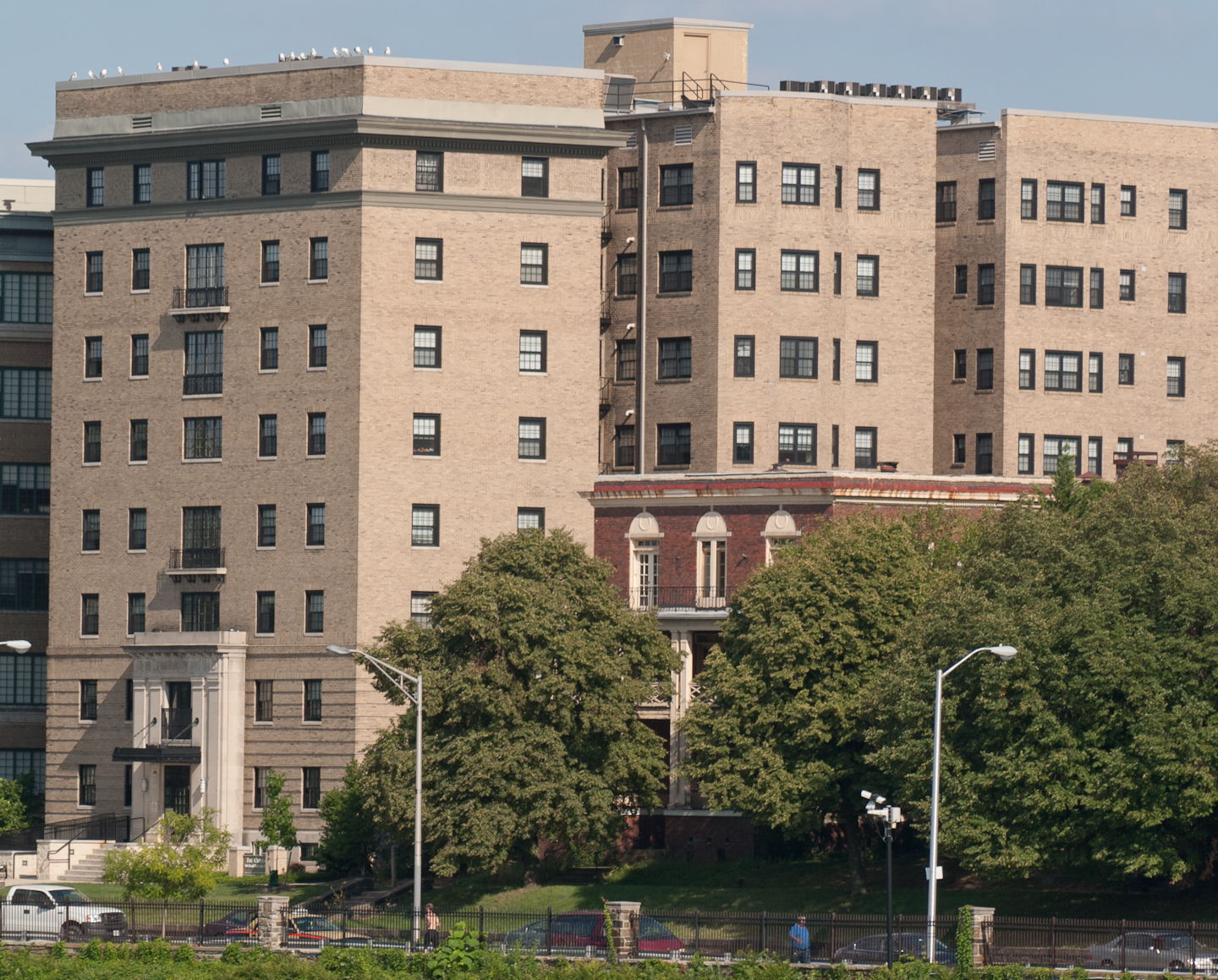
- Lake Drive Apartments, August 2011

- Location within Baltimore Location within Maryland Location within the United States
- Location: 903 Druid Park Lake Dr., Baltimore, Maryland
- Coordinates: 39°19′0″N 76°38′13″W
- Area: less than one acre
- Built: 1920
- Architect: Palmer, Edward Livingston Jr.
- Architectural style: Classical Revival
- NRHP reference No.: 01001368
- Added to NRHP: December 28, 2001

Lake Drive Apartments is a historic apartment building located at Baltimore, Maryland, United States. It is an 8-story high-rise building, built in 1919–1920, and designed by prominent local architect Edward L. Palmer Jr. in the Classical Revival style.

Lake Drive Apartments was listed on the National Register of Historic Places in 2001.
