= Edward L. Palmer Jr. =

American architect (1877–1952)

- Born: May 26, 1877; Baltimore
- Died: May 13, 1952 (aged 74); Baltimore
- Occupation: Architect
- Awards: Fellow of the American Institute of Architects
- Practice: Palmer, Willis & Lamdin; Palmer & Lamdin; Palmer, Fisher, Williams & Nes

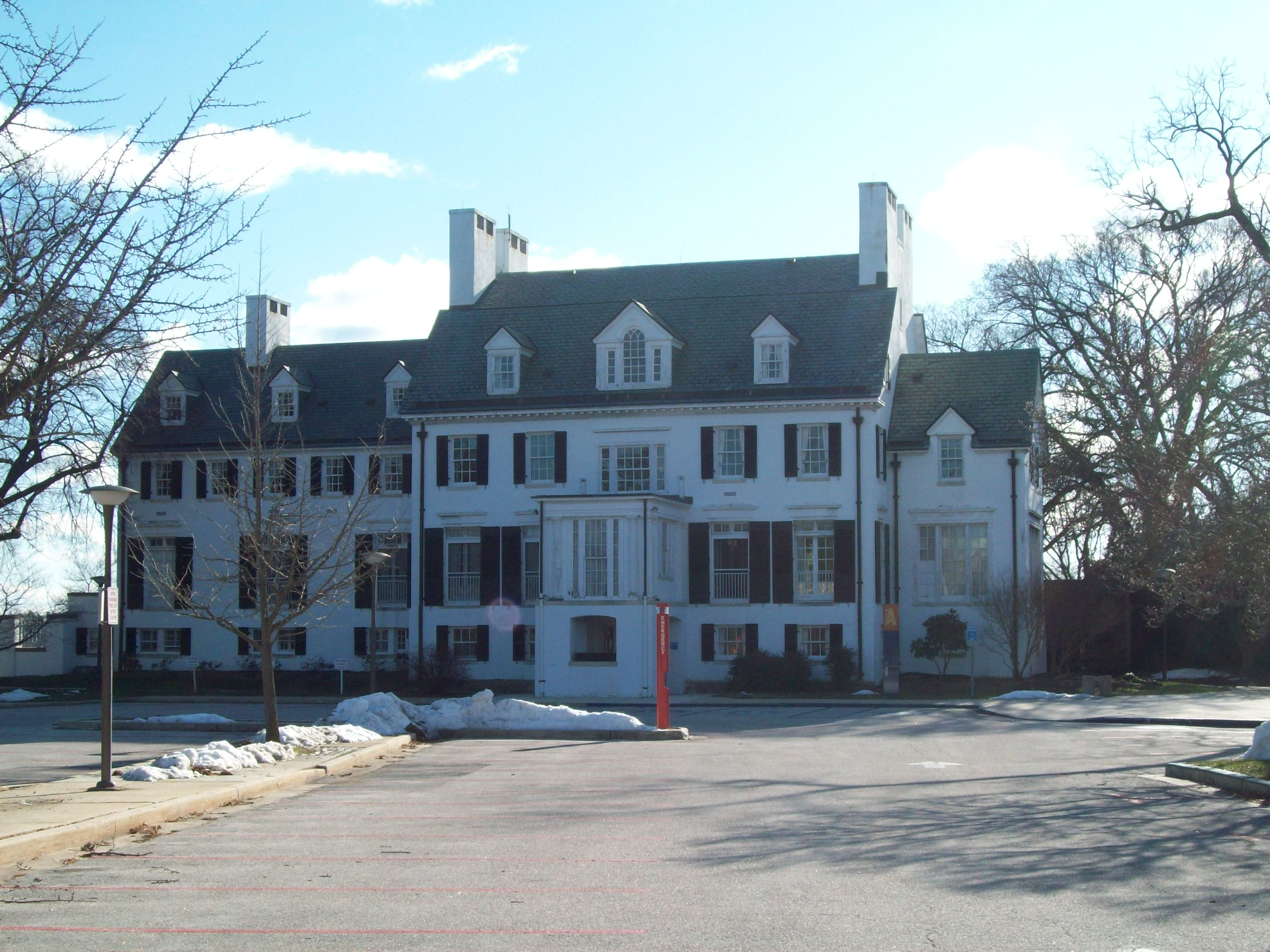
Hilton estate in Catonsville, rebuilt to Palmer's design in 1917.

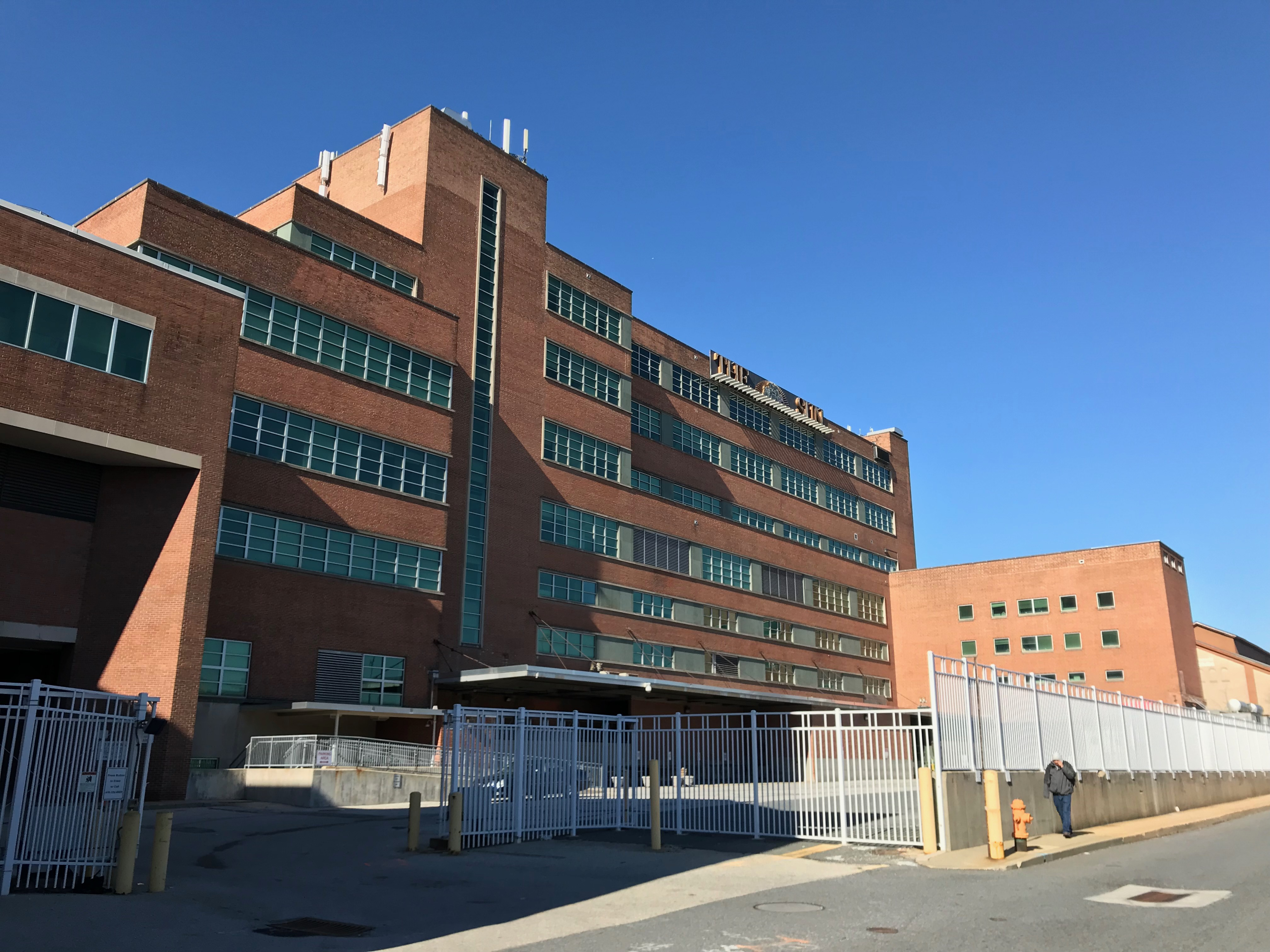
The Sunpapers Building in Baltimore, the longtime home of the Baltimore Sun, completed in 1950.

Edward Livingston Palmer Jr. FAIA (May 26, 1877 – May 13, 1952) was an American architect from Baltimore, Maryland, credited with the design and development of several planned neighborhoods such as Homeland, Roland Park, Guilford, Wawaset Park, and the design of many buildings within Dundalk, Maryland, which were created specifically for the workers of Bethlehem Steel

== Life and career ==
Edward Palmer received a Bachelor of Arts degree from the Johns Hopkins University. Palmer was one of 38 in his graduating class on June 13, 1899. While at Hopkins, he became a member of the Beta Theta Pi fraternity. Palmer then went into the insurance business in Washington, D.C. where he resided at 1516 H St in the NW section of the city. Shortly after, Palmer began attending the University of Pennsylvania. Here he received his B.S. in architecture in 1903.

After working for Hornblower & Marshall, in 1907 Palmer was appointed resident architect for the Roland Park Company. Ten years later, in 1917, he established his own practice in Baltimore. In 1925 he formed the firm of Palmer, Willis & Lamdin in partnership with John S. Willis and William D. Lamdin. Willis left the partnership in 1929, but Palmer & Lamdin continued until Lamdin's death in 1945. Palmer then formed a new partnership with architects L. McLane Fisher, Carroll R. Williams Jr. and Charles M. Nes Jr. He also replaced Lamdin on the State Board of Architects. Palmer's second partnership lasted until his death in 1952. The firm was then led by Fisher under the names Fisher, Williams, Nes & Campbell, Fisher, Nes, Campbell & Associates and Fisher, Nes, Campbell & Partners until his retirement in 1972 and then by Nes as Nes, Campbell & Partners and NCP Inc. until his own retirement in 1988. The firm did not last long after Nes's retirement, and was forfeited in 1995.

Palmer was elected chapter president of the Baltimore American Institute of Architects in 1926. He was also named a Fellow of the A.I.A. national organization in 1948. He served the Baltimore community through participation in the Homewood Building Committee, The Johns Hopkins University Advisory Board, the Goucher College Architectural Advisory Board, Baltimore City Planning Commission, and the Maryland Board of Examiners and its committee for Registration of Architects.

== Personal life ==
Palmer was married to Miss Jessie Loeffler, native of Pittsburgh and graduate of Goucher College. The two were married in 1907 by the Rev. Dr. Partridge. The ceremony was held in the backyard of the bride's brother, George Loeffler, on Woodworth Ave. The guests in attendance of the wedding consisted of family and a few close friends. Two years later he built a house for him and his wife on Longwood Rd. in Baltimore.

He lived in several neighborhoods throughout Baltimore, including Roland Park and Homeland. Later on in his life he held several residences on Gibson Island, including a home at 7 Midvale Rd. and a home off Harbor Water Rd.

Palmer had one daughter, Anne Livingston Palmer, a 1931 graduate of The Bryn Mawr School. After earning a bachelor's degree in zoology in 1935 from Smith College, she studied sculpture and painting at the Phillips Gallery of Art in Washington. Anne was married to the well-known cardiologist and professor, Dr. Bruce Sinclair-Smith, of Australia, in London, England on March 9, 1951. The couple then resided in England where Dr. Sinclair-Smith had residency at London Heart Hospital. In late 1951, the couple would then move to Australia and then eventually back to the US. At the age of 65, Dr. Sinclair-Smith died on January 1, 1985, of stomach cancer. Anne Livingston Sinclair-Smith died at age 94 on March 9, 2006. The two were survived by their daughter Susanne Palmer Sinclair-Smith of Washington.

Palmer had one brother, Albert G. Palmer or Montgomery County, Maryland, and three sisters. The three sisters were Carrol R. Williams of Philadelphia, Pennsylvania, Mrs. Thomas Janney Brown of Washington, D.C., and Mrs. Robert E. Robinson of Greenwich, Conn. His mother was Susan C. Palmer who died January 29, 1911. On his father's side, Palmer Jr. had 2 uncles and an aunt. They were John M. Palmer of Baltimore, Arthur W. Palmer of Louisville, Kentucky, and Mrs. Mary Palmer Beal of Montgomery County, Maryland.

Born in 1832, Palmer's father, Edward Livingston Palmer Sr. of Simpsonville, Howard County, Maryland, was one of Baltimore's widest known merchants in the late 1800s. His company of E.L. Palmer & Co. owned several fast moving clipper ships, of which Baltimore is known for. The company sailed all over the world, bringing back goods to the port of Baltimore. His business continued until the Baltimore Fire of 1904, when he retired the company to his partners creating Palmer, Harvey and Co. Edward Livingston Palmer Sr. died December 17, 1917.

== Selected works ==
- 1917: Hilton, Catonsville, Maryland
- 1919–20: Lake Drive Apartments, Baltimore, Maryland
- 1924: Biltmore Forest Country Club in Asheville, North Carolina
- 1926: St. Casimir Church, Baltimore
- 1937: Goucher College
- 1950 Sunpapers Building
