= Baron Peak =

Mountain in the state of Idaho

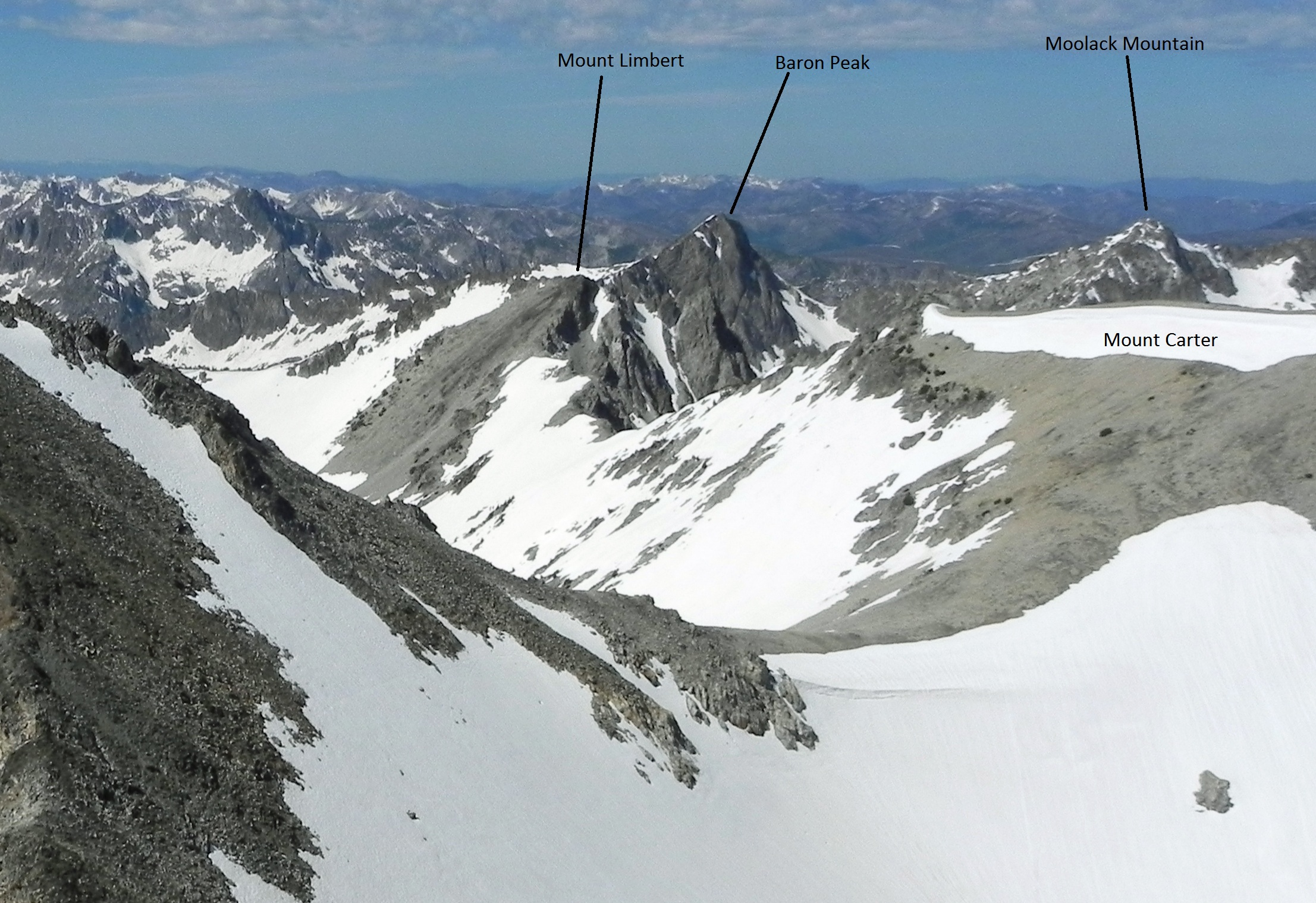
- Baron Peak from Thompson Peak

Highest point
- Elevation: 10,297 ft (3,139 m)
- Prominence: 817 ft (249 m)
- Parent peak: Moolack Mountain
- Coordinates: 44°07′26″N 115°02′44″W

Geography
- Location within Idaho
- Location: Boise and Custer counties, Idaho, U.S.
- Parent range: Sawtooth Range
- Topo map: USGS Warbonnet Peak

Climbing
- Easiest route: Scrambling, class 3

Baron Peak, at 10,297 feet (3,139 m) above sea level is a peak in the Sawtooth Range of Idaho. The peak is located in the Sawtooth Wilderness of Sawtooth National Recreation Area on the border of Boise and Custer counties. The peak is located 0.5 mi (0.80 km) southeast of Moolack Mountain, its line parent.

== See also ==
- List of peaks of the Sawtooth Range (Idaho)
- List of mountains of Idaho
- List of mountain peaks of Idaho
- List of mountain ranges in Idaho
