= Charles M. Nes Jr. =

American architect (1906–1989)

- Born: October 19, 1906; York, Pennsylvania
- Died: April 30, 1989 (aged 82); Cockeysville, Maryland
- Occupation: Architect
- Practice: Palmer, Fisher, Williams & Nes; Fisher, Williams, Nes & Campbell; Fisher, Nes, Campbell & Associates; Fisher, Nes, Campbell & Partners; Nes, Campbell & Partners; NCP

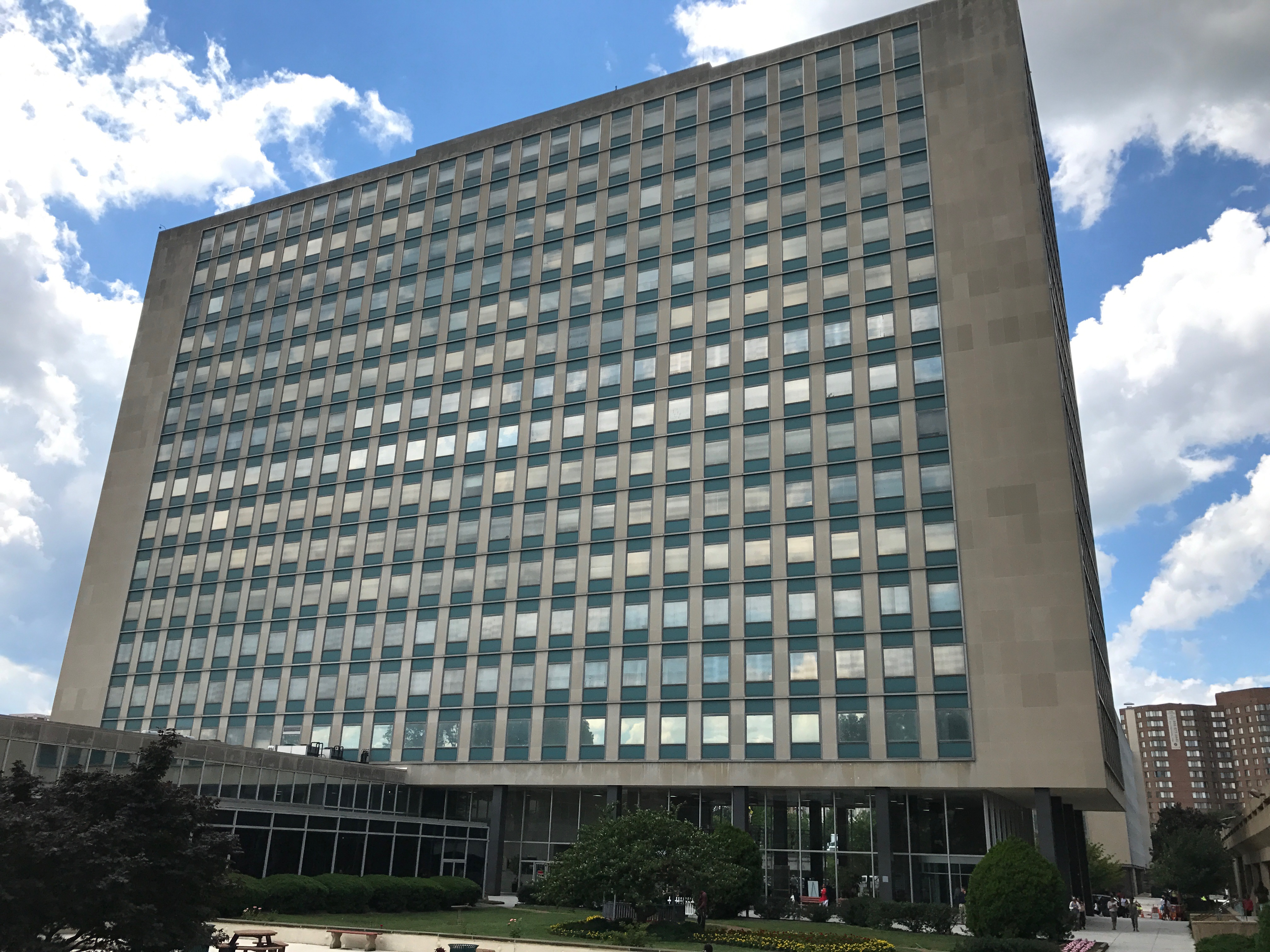
The State Office Building in Baltimore, designed by Fisher, Nes, Campbell & Associates and completed in 1959.

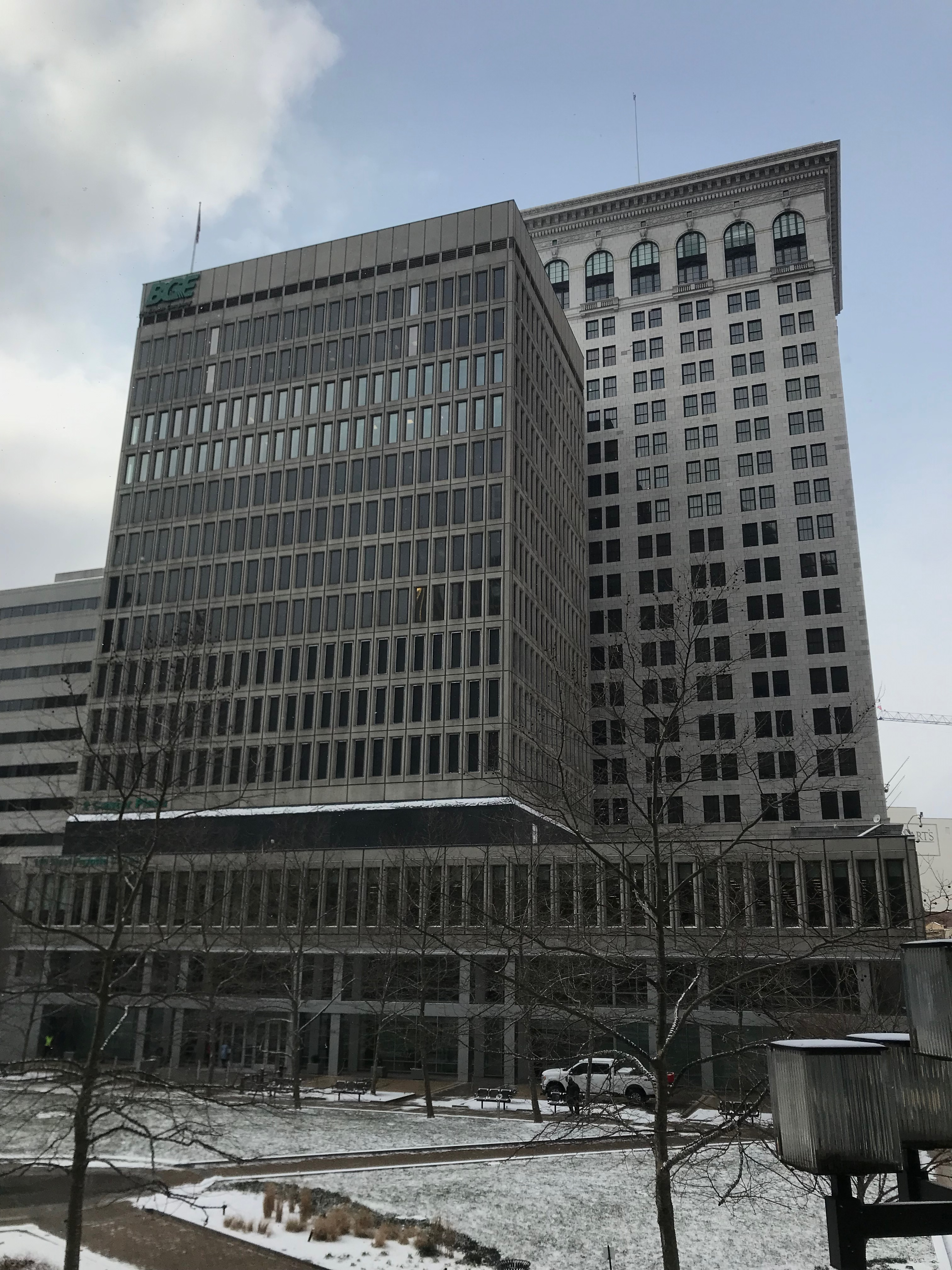
The Baltimore Gas and Electric Company Building extension in Baltimore, completed in 1966.

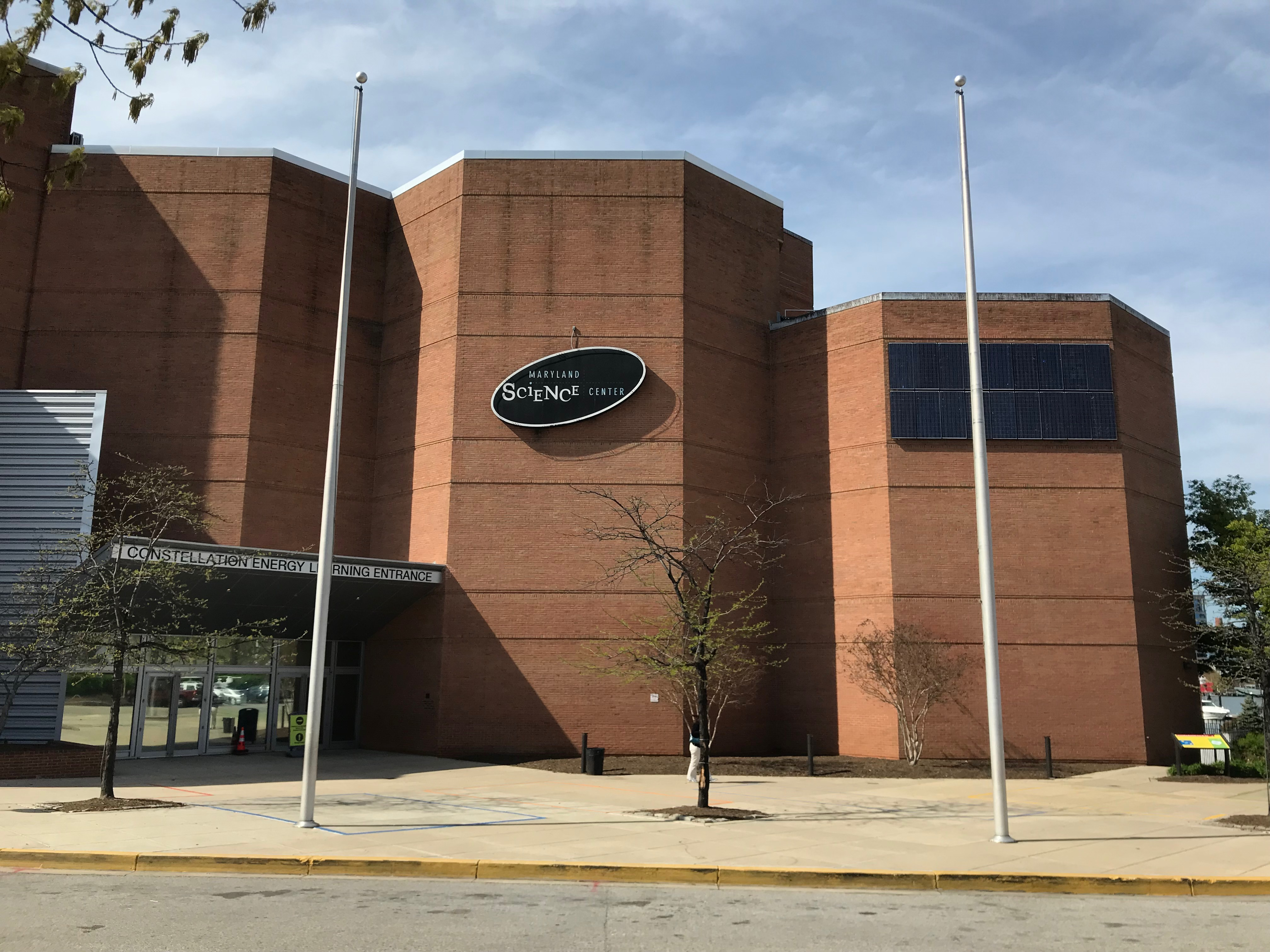
The Maryland Science Center in Baltimore, designed by Nes, Campbell & Partners and Edward Durell Stone and completed in 1976.

Charles M. Nes Jr. FAIA (1906–1989) was an American architect in practice in Baltimore from 1936 to 1988. He was president of the American Institute of Architects for the year 1966–67.

== Life and career ==
Charles Motier Nes Jr. was born October 19, 1906, in York, Pennsylvania, to Charles Motier Nes and Ethel (Billmeyer) Nes. He was educated in the York public schools and Princeton University, earning a BA in 1928 and an MArch in 1930. After graduation he joined Palmer & Lamdin, the Baltimore architecture firm of Edward L. Palmer Jr. and William D. Lamdin, and was made a junior partner in 1936. Nes worked with Palmer & Lamdin until the outbreak of World War II, enlisting in the United States Army Air Forces in 1942. He served until 1945, and was awarded the Bronze Star Medal and the Croix de Guerre. As Nes returned to Baltimore, William D. Lamdin died. Palmer then formed a new partnership with Nes and two other senior employees, L. McLane Fisher and Carroll R. Williams Jr., in the reorganized Palmer, Fisher, Williams & Nes. In 1953, following Palmer's 1952 death, the firm became Fisher, Williams, Nes & Campbell, and later Fisher, Nes, Campbell & Associates and Fisher, Nes, Campbell & Partners. In 1972 Fisher retired and the firm was split into two: Nes, Campbell & Partners and Richter Cornbrooks Matthai Hopkins. The firm soon moved its offices to suburban Towson and was incorporated as NCP in 1980. Nes retired from practice in 1988, shortly before his death. The firm did not last long after his death, and was forfeited in 1995.

Nes and his partner Fisher, both Princeton graduates, designed the Architecture Building at the university, completed in 1963. Nes also served on the advisory committee to the school of architecture from 1969 to 1971.

Fisher joined the American Institute of Architects in 1935 as a member of the Baltimore chapter. He served as chapter president from 1949 to 1951 and as Middle Atlantic regional director from 1963 to 1965 before being elected president for the year 1966–67. He was elected a Fellow in 1955, was a Benjamin Franklin fellow of the Royal Society of Arts and an honorary member of the Royal Architectural Institute of Canada and the Society of Architects of Mexico.

== Personal life ==
Charles Motier Nes, Jr. was married in 1927 to Elizabeth Linda Griffin of New York. The union resulted in two children, Charles Motier Nes, III (1928-2009) born in Massachusetts and dubbed "The Princeton Baby of 1928" and Ethel Linda Nes (1934-1969) born in Maryland and married (1st) William Adamson, Jr. and (2nd) Barrington Boardman.

Charles Nes, Jr. remarried in 1948 to Kathleen Garnham, a world champion golfer among other accomplishments. He died April 30, 1989, in Cockeysville, Maryland.

== Architectural works ==
- State Roads Building and State Office Building, 300 and 301 W Preston St, Baltimore (1958–59)
- Architecture Building, Princeton University, Princeton, New Jersey (1960–63)
- Basic science building, Johns Hopkins University, Baltimore (1960)
- Baltimore Gas and Electric Company Building extension, 39 W Lexington St, Baltimore (1966)
- George H. Fallon Federal Building, (Note: Designed in association with Fenton & Lichtig of Baltimore.) 31 Hopkins Plz, Baltimore (1967)
- Bel Air Middle School, 99 Idlewild St, Bel Air, Maryland (1968)
- Joppatowne High School, 555 Joppa Farm Rd, Joppatowne, Maryland (1969)
- Maryland Science Center, (Note: Designed in association with Edward Durell Stone of New York City.) 601 Light St, Baltimore (1976)
