= National Enameling and Stamping Company =

- U.S. National Register of Historic Places
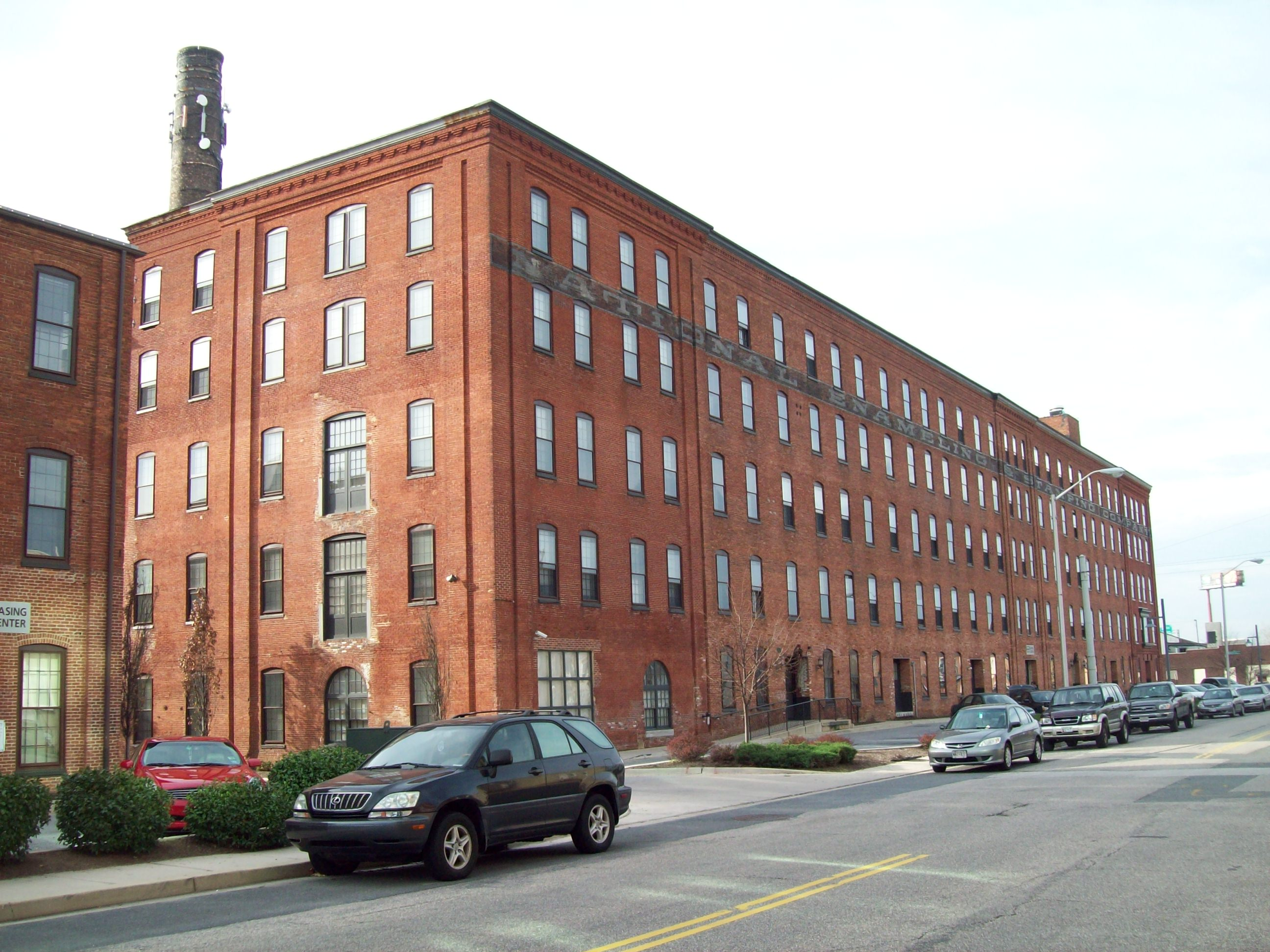
- National Enameling and Stamping Company, December 2011

- Location within Baltimore Location within Maryland Location within the United States
- Location: 1901 Light St., Baltimore, Maryland
- Coordinates: 39°16′4″N 76°36′38″W
- Area: 1 acre (0.40 ha)
- Built: 1860
- Architect: Pohl, Anton; et al.
- Architectural style: Gothic Revival, Late Victorian
- NRHP reference No.: 02001583
- Added to NRHP: December 30, 2002

National Enameling and Stamping Company was incorporated in New Jersey on 21 January 1899. It absorbed several U.S. firms long embroiled in legal disputes about proprietary manufacturing processes: the St. Louis Stamping Company, Kieckhefer Brothers Co. (Milwaukee), Haberman Manufacturing Co. (Brooklyn), and Matthai, Ingram and Co. (Baltimore). In the early 20th century, one of its trade-name brands was Royal Granite Enameled Ware. Another was the "Nesco Perfect Oil Cook Stove." By 1940 the NESCO plant in Granite City, IL (near St. Louis) alone had 1500 employees. By the mid-1940s the firm billed itself as "The World's Largest Manufacturer of Housewares." Metal Ware, of Two Rivers, WI, purchased NESCO in 1981.

== Baltimore factory ==
One former National Enameling and Stamping Company plant is the historic factory complex located at Baltimore. It was constructed in 1887 by Matthai, Ingram, and Co.--one of the metalworking firms absorbed in the incorporation of NESCO in 1899. The densely packed complex fills an almost 5-acre (2.0 ha) site and consists of 17 interconnected buildings and one structure that vary in height from one to five stories. The complex was organized to house three primary functions in discrete sections: the manufacture of tinware, the manufacture of enameled and japanned wares, and storage, warehousing, and distribution. The plant ceased production of tinware and enameled wares in 1952.

NESCO owner George Worth Knapp lived nearby at the Hilton estate and dairy farm near Catonsville, Maryland purchased in 1917.

National Enameling and Stamping Company was listed on the National Register of Historic Places in 2002.
