= Echo, Utah =

Echo
- CDP
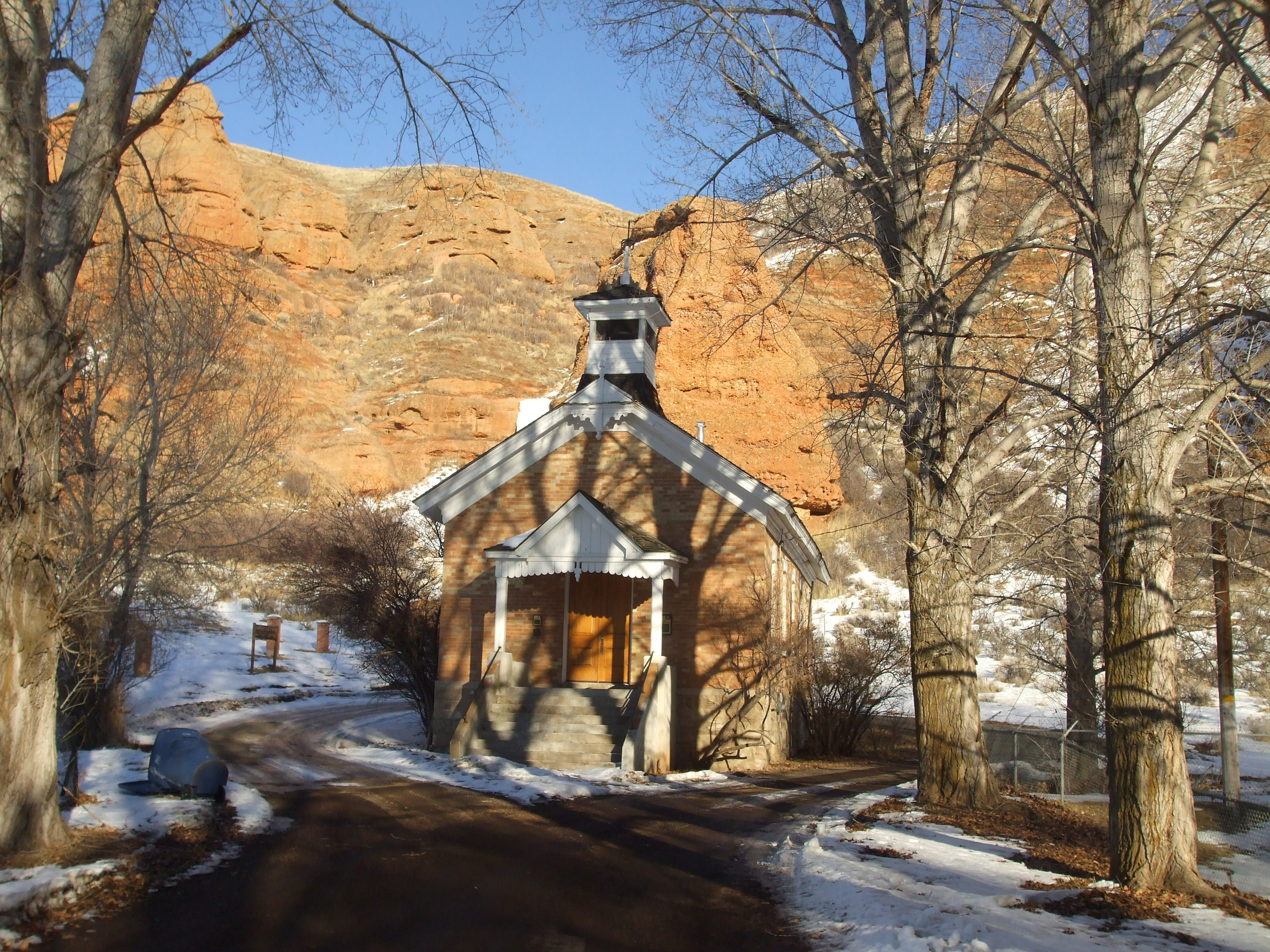
- The Old Echo Church

- Location in Summit County and the state of Utah
- Coordinates: 40°58′49″N 111°26′21″W
- Country: United States
- State: Utah
- County: Summit
- Settled: 1854
- Founder: James Bromley
- Named for: Echo Canyon
- Elevation: 5,748 ft (1,752 m)

Population (2020)
  - Total: 60
- Time zone: UTC-7 (Mountain (MST))
  - Summer (DST): UTC-6 (MDT)
- ZIP code: 84024
- Area code: 435
- GNIS feature ID: 2584763

Echo is a census-designated place located in northwestern Summit County, Utah, United States. The population was 60 at the 2020 census.

Echo was founded in 1854. The community took its name from nearby Echo Canyon.

== History ==
Echo originated as a stopover along the Mormon Trail. The town served as a junction between the First transcontinental railroad and a spur line to serve silver mines near Park City. Since the creation of U.S. Highways Echo has served as a highway junction, where the main road coming from Wyoming splits with one branch proceeding towards Salt Lake City, continuing towards San Francisco, California, and the other towards Ogden, continuing to Portland, Oregon. Originally the main highway was numbered U.S. Route 30S and the branch was U.S. Route 530; the modern freeway equivalents are numbered Interstate 80 and Interstate 84.

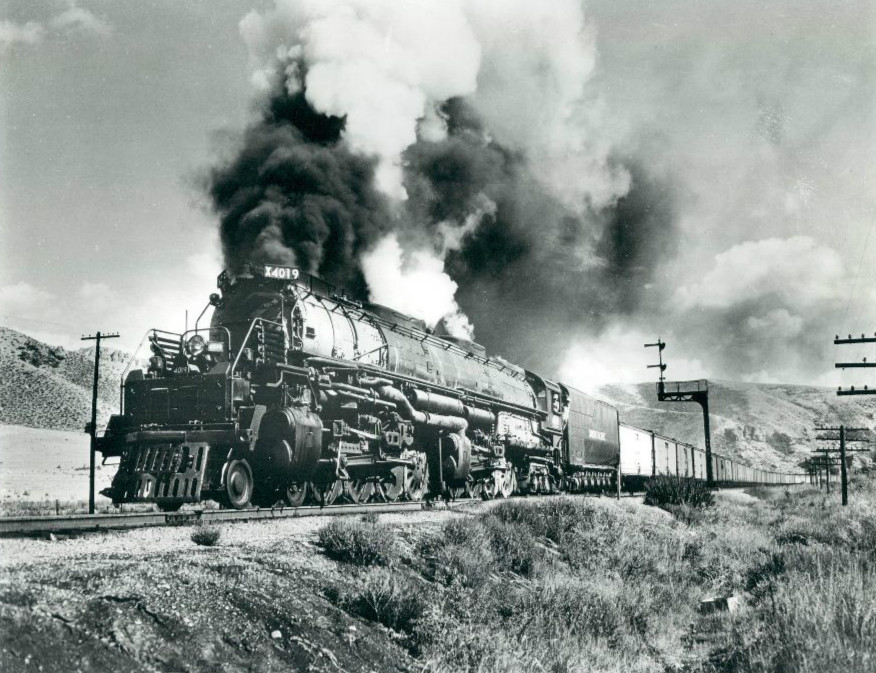
Union Pacific Big Boy No. 4019 climbing Echo Canyon

Echo was significant to the Union Pacific Railroad. The town served as a coaling and watering station for trains entering Echo Canyon. From Echo, helper locomotives were added, when needed, to push trains up the steep grade to Wahsatch. A large coaling tower and many other railroad infrastructures existed in and around the town. Echo saw the most action during World War II.

The introduction of diesel power, especially after the war, negated the need for the services previously required by steam. The coaling tower, most trackage, and structures were removed.

Echo had faded by the 1960s, yet was still alive by the junction of two major highways. However, the arrival of the interstate relegated the town to a few buildings; some homes, a motel, tavern, restaurant and bus station. Nearby, Echo Canyon is a visual spectacle with its high rock sides and colorful scenery. The canyon begins just east of Echo and ends outside of the ghost town of Wahsatch, Utah.

== Geography ==
=== Climate ===
Echo has a continental climate (Köppen Dfb) characterized by cold, snowy winters and hot summers with high diurnal temperature variation.

Climate data for Echo Dam, Utah, 1991–2020 normals, extremes 1940–present
Month	Jan	Feb	Mar	Apr	May	Jun	Jul	Aug	Sep	Oct	Nov	Dec	Year
Record high °F (°C)	59 (15)	67 (19)	76 (24)	85 (29)	91 (33)	101 (38)	100 (38)	100 (38)	99 (37)	86 (30)	75 (24)	65 (18)	101 (38)
Mean maximum °F (°C)	48.5 (9.2)	53.8 (12.1)	66.0 (18.9)	74.4 (23.6)	82.3 (27.9)	90.7 (32.6)	95.4 (35.2)	93.9 (34.4)	88.3 (31.3)	78.9 (26.1)	65.0 (18.3)	50.9 (10.5)	96.0 (35.6)
Mean daily maximum °F (°C)	35.1 (1.7)	40.6 (4.8)	51.9 (11.1)	59.4 (15.2)	69.1 (20.6)	80.3 (26.8)	88.9 (31.6)	87.2 (30.7)	78.3 (25.7)	64.5 (18.1)	48.4 (9.1)	35.6 (2.0)	61.6 (16.4)
Daily mean °F (°C)	23.7 (−4.6)	28.3 (−2.1)	38.3 (3.5)	45.1 (7.3)	53.5 (11.9)	62.0 (16.7)	69.9 (21.1)	68.3 (20.2)	59.5 (15.3)	47.7 (8.7)	35.3 (1.8)	24.9 (−3.9)	46.4 (8.0)
Mean daily minimum °F (°C)	12.2 (−11.0)	16.0 (−8.9)	24.8 (−4.0)	30.7 (−0.7)	37.8 (3.2)	43.8 (6.6)	50.8 (10.4)	49.4 (9.7)	40.8 (4.9)	30.9 (−0.6)	22.3 (−5.4)	14.2 (−9.9)	31.1 (−0.5)
Mean minimum °F (°C)	−10.1 (−23.4)	−7.0 (−21.7)	7.2 (−13.8)	17.2 (−8.2)	24.8 (−4.0)	32.0 (0.0)	40.8 (4.9)	38.6 (3.7)	27.5 (−2.5)	16.4 (−8.7)	2.9 (−16.2)	−7.1 (−21.7)	−14.3 (−25.7)
Record low °F (°C)	−34 (−37)	−34 (−37)	−25 (−32)	2 (−17)	16 (−9)	22 (−6)	30 (−1)	23 (−5)	14 (−10)	−7 (−22)	−21 (−29)	−32 (−36)	−34 (−37)
Average precipitation inches (mm)	1.22 (31)	0.94 (24)	1.19 (30)	1.47 (37)	1.93 (49)	1.18 (30)	0.71 (18)	0.83 (21)	1.22 (31)	1.43 (36)	1.32 (34)	1.29 (33)	14.73 (374)
Average snowfall inches (cm)	17.3 (44)	12.0 (30)	8.2 (21)	4.9 (12)	0.7 (1.8)	0.0 (0.0)	0.0 (0.0)	0.0 (0.0)	0.5 (1.3)	2.0 (5.1)	10.3 (26)	16.4 (42)	72.3 (184)
Average precipitation days (≥ 0.01 in)	9.8	9.0	9.3	9.6	9.9	6.1	4.4	5.8	5.9	7.3	8.4	9.9	95.4
Average snowy days (≥ 0.1 in)	7.3	6.1	3.5	2.4	0.4	0.0	0.0	0.0	0.1	0.9	4.3	7.0	32.0
Source: NOAA

== Demographics ==
Historical population
Census	Pop.	Note	%±
2010	56		—
2020	60		7.1%

As of the census of 2010, there were 56 people living in the CDP. There were 31 housing units. The ethnic makeup of the town was 96.4% White and 3.6% American Native and Alaska Native. Hispanic or Latino of any race were 19.6% of the population.

== Education ==
Echo is in the North Summit School District.

== See also ==
- List of census-designated places in Utah
- National Register of Historic Places listings in Summit County, Utah
