= Wasatch Elementary =

Wasatch Elementary may refer to any of several primary schools in the state of Utah:

- Wasatch Elementary (Ogden, Utah), Ogden City School District
- Wasatch Elementary School (Provo, Utah), Provo School District
- Wasatch Elementary School (Salt Lake City, Utah), Salt Lake City School District
