= Wysox =

Wysox may refer to:

- Wysox Township, Carroll County, Illinois
- Wysox Township, Pennsylvania
- Wysox Creek, a tributary of the Susquehanna River in Pennsylvania
