= Keewaydin Island =

Island in Collier County, Florida, United States

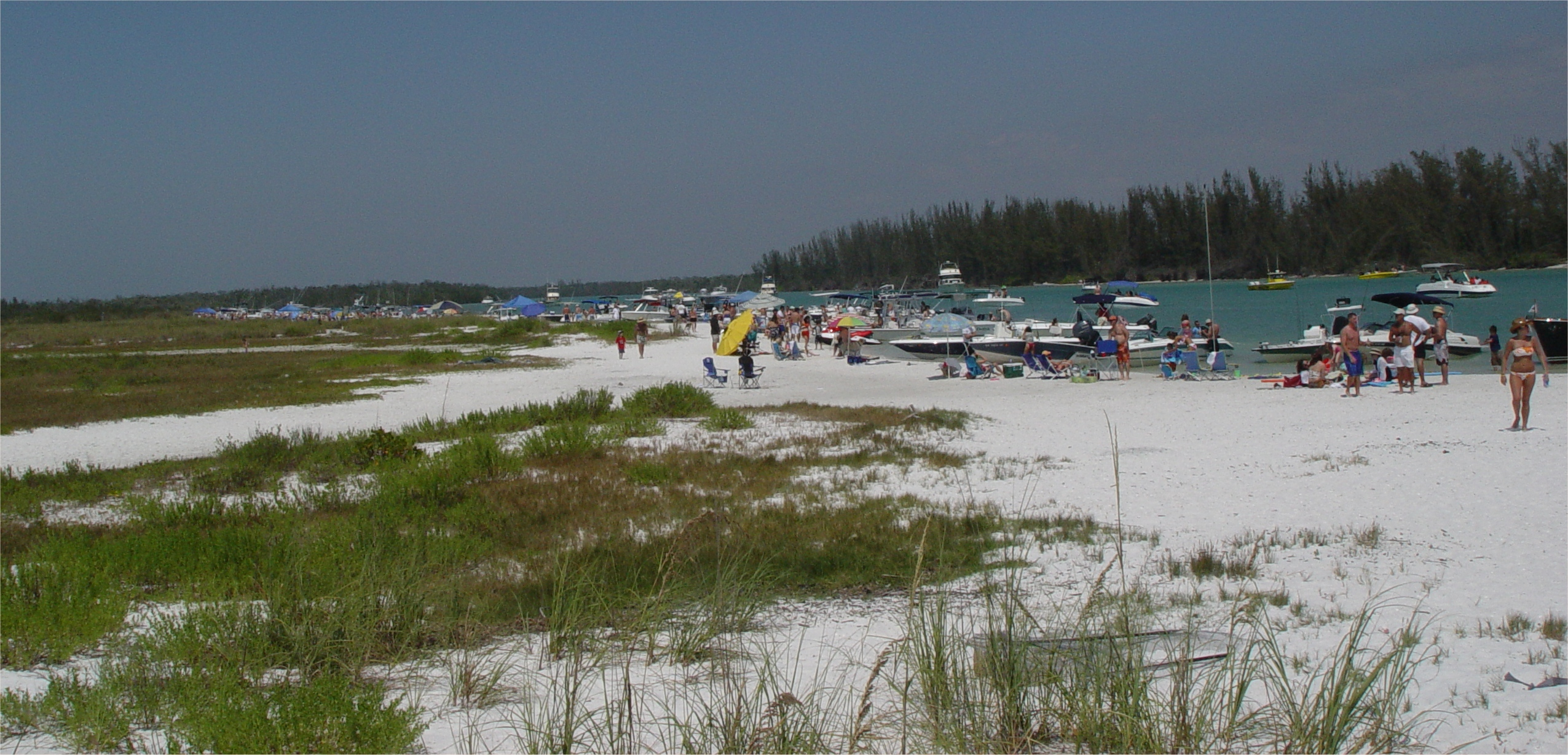
- Keeywadin Island's Public Beach

- Keewaydin Island Keewaydin Island (the Caribbean)

Geography
- Location: Gulf of Mexico
- Coordinates: 26°02′46″N 81°46′42″W

Administration
- United States
- State: Florida
- County: Collier

Keewaydin Island is a primary barrier island located off the coast of Naples, in Collier County, Florida, United States. It can be reached only by boat. It is managed by the State of Florida's Coastal Office, in cooperation with NOAA, within the Rookery Bay National Estuarine Research Reserve. Keewaydin Island is monitored nightly for Loggerhead turtle nesting activity by The Conservancy of Southwest Florida.

The Keewaydin Island shoreline has been mapped annually since 1997 in an effort to document shoreline change. The shoreline is also mapped after significant storm events. Mapping is done by collecting Global Positioning System locations along the dune-line and then downloaded using Geographic information system software.

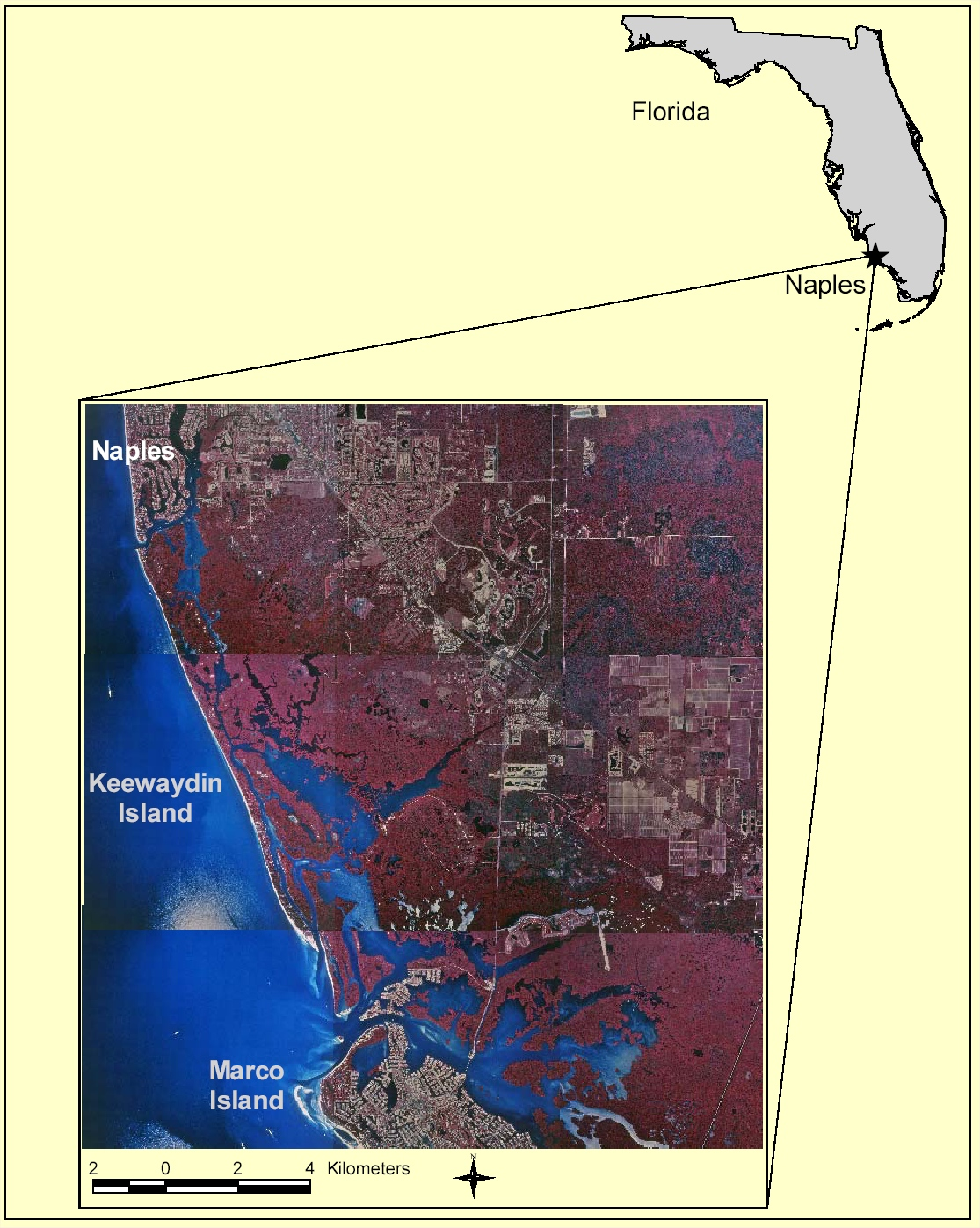
Keewaydin Island

== History ==
Originally, the island was named Kee Island. It became part of the Keewaydin Camps Ltd. corporation and was later known as Keewaydin Island. The island is currently about 85% public property and 15% private. Approximately 50 private lots and 15 private homes dot the island, located on the west side of the island close to the beachfront. Marco Island can be seen from the southern tip of Keewaydin.

Keewaydin Island is a barrier island in Florida that has no cars, roads, or bridges. It had a history of being the next developable barrier island, after Marco Island to the south was developed in the 1950s, 1960s, and onward. During the late 1950s and early 60s when the government was planning a road and bridge out to the island, 1,000 local residents signed a petition to stop the road and any future commercial development. They wanted to avoid the pattern on barrier islands at the time, such as Fort Myers Beach, where local residents were 85% against dense development, but zoning laws and large property owners held sway. In fact, high density high rise structures line the shores on most barrier islands in Florida, except notable places like Keewaydin, where the environmentalist movement finally got enough momentum to stop the bridge to the island. As a result, Keewaydin remains primitive, with the only infrastructure being dirt pathways connecting the private docks on the eastern side to the houses on the western beach side. Locals and visitors can relish the experience of a visit to a pristine barrier island and its ecosystem.

Most commonly known for the south tip of the island, where local boaters congregate at the end of the 8 mile long isthmus, where they can park their boat on the shore and enjoy people watching and the beach and scenery.

There are 12 homes on the island, and 50 lots, with the most famous house belonging at one time to James Biden, President Joe Biden's brother, who would occasionally visit. The "Biden Bungalow", as the house was known, was sold in 2018 for $1.35 million.

== Wildlife ==
The island is included in the Rookery Bay National Estuarine Research Reserve. Mammals such as wild boar, bobcat, and white-tailed deer live on the island. The gopher tortoise, which is threatened by habitat destruction, finds sanctuary on this island, aside from the invasive iguana which feeds on the tortoise's eggs.

== See also ==
- Keewaydin Club
- Marco Island
- Rookery Bay
