= Wawaset Park, Wilmington, Delaware =

- Wawaset Park
- U.S. National Register of Historic Places
- U.S. Historic district
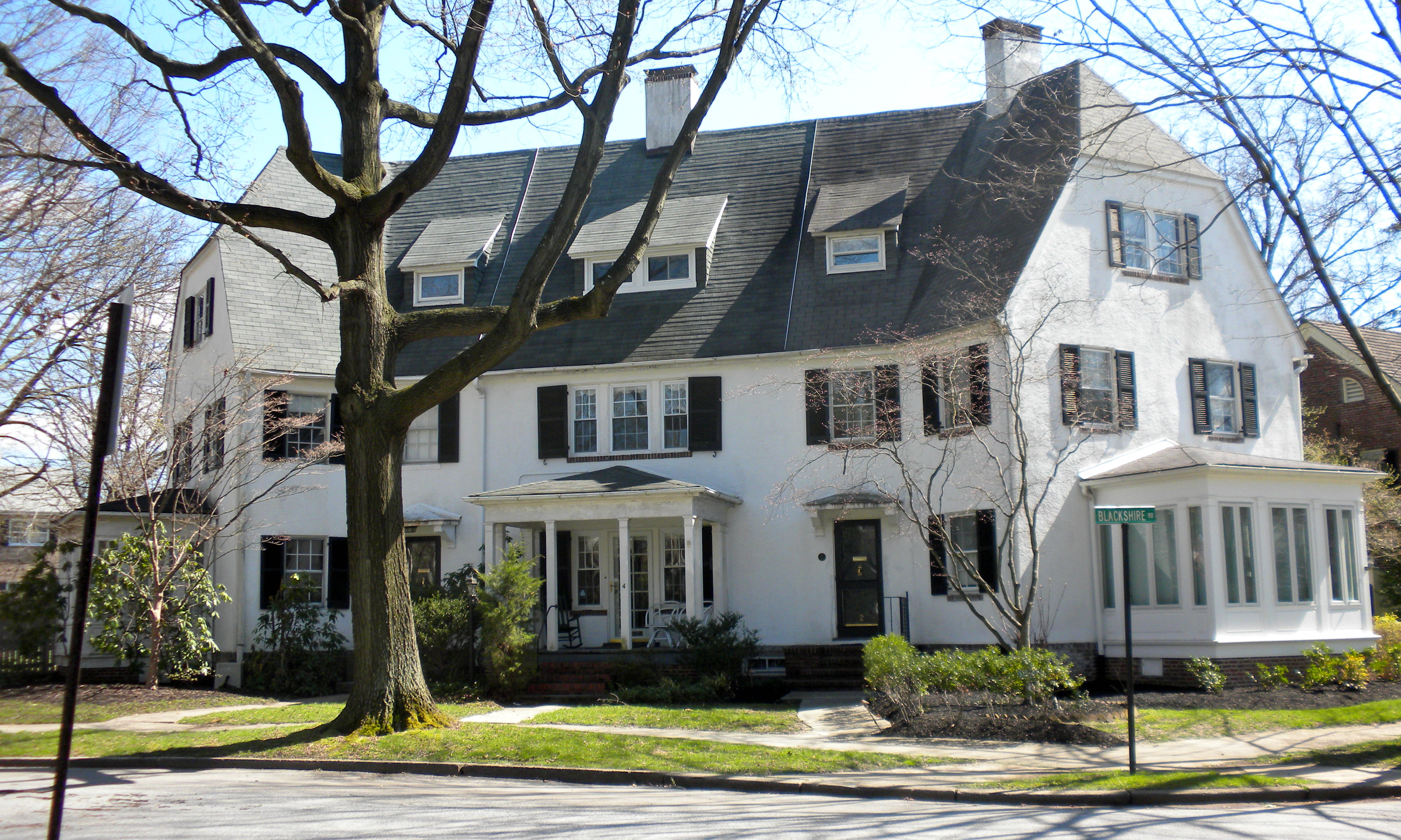
- Crawford Circle, Wawaset Park, April 2010

- Location within Delaware Location within the United States
- Location: Bounded by Pennsylvania Ave., Woodlawn Ave., Seventh St., and Greenhill Ave., Wilmington, Delaware
- Coordinates: 39°45′20″N 75°34′30″W
- Area: 45.9 acres (18.6 ha)
- Built: 1919
- Architect: Edward L. Palmer Jr., et al.
- Architectural style: Tudor Revival, Gothic Revival, Georgian
- NRHP reference No.: 86000008
- Added to NRHP: January 3, 1986

Wawaset Park is a planned community national historic district located on the western edge of the City of Wilmington, New Castle County, Delaware. The area was formerly the grounds of Schuetzen Park, a horse racing and later auto racing track and fairgrounds. It was purchased in 1917 by the DuPont Company and developed into single-family houses, semi-detached and row houses to meet the housing need for the company's expanding corporate staff. The historic district encompasses 321 contributing buildings and 1 contributing structure.

The neighborhood's design by noted Baltimore architect Edward L. Palmer Jr., with curvilinear streets and ample lawns giving it the setting of a suburb within the city, was influenced by the work of Frederick Law Olmsted, and its architecture includes Tudor cottages, Georgian mansions, and elements of the Picturesque and Gothic styles. The dwellings are unified by slate roofing.

The historic district was added to the National Register of Historic Places in 1986.

== Education ==
It is in the Red Clay Consolidated School District. Zoned schools are Highlands Elementary School, Alexis I. du Pont Middle School, and Alexis I. du Pont High School.
