= Keewaydin Club =

- U.S. National Register of Historic Places

- Location within Florida Location within the United States
- Location: Collier County, Florida
- Nearest city: Naples, Florida
- Coordinates: 26°5′23″N 81°48′2″W
- NRHP reference No.: 87001979
- Added to NRHP: December 22, 1987

The Keewaydin Club is a historic site in Naples, Florida. The Inn, which opened in 1934 and closed in 1999, is located at the north end of Keewaydin Island.

On December 22, 1987, it was added to the U.S. National Register of Historic Places, becoming the second site in Florida to do so.

The island remained basically natural with no cars or vehicles other than a golf cart at the club on the few southern hundred yards of the 7 mile long island where the club and its guest cottages were located.

Ferry access to the Inn was aboard the Kokomis, a 21-footer now part of the Collier County Museum.
