= Teton, South Dakota =

Unincorporated community in South Dakota, U.S.

Coordinates: 44°17′13″N 100°30′28″W

Teton is an unincorporated community in Stanley County, in the U.S. state of South Dakota.

== History ==
The community was named after the Teton Sioux Indian Tribe.
