= Moolack Mountain (Idaho) =

Mountain in the state of Idaho

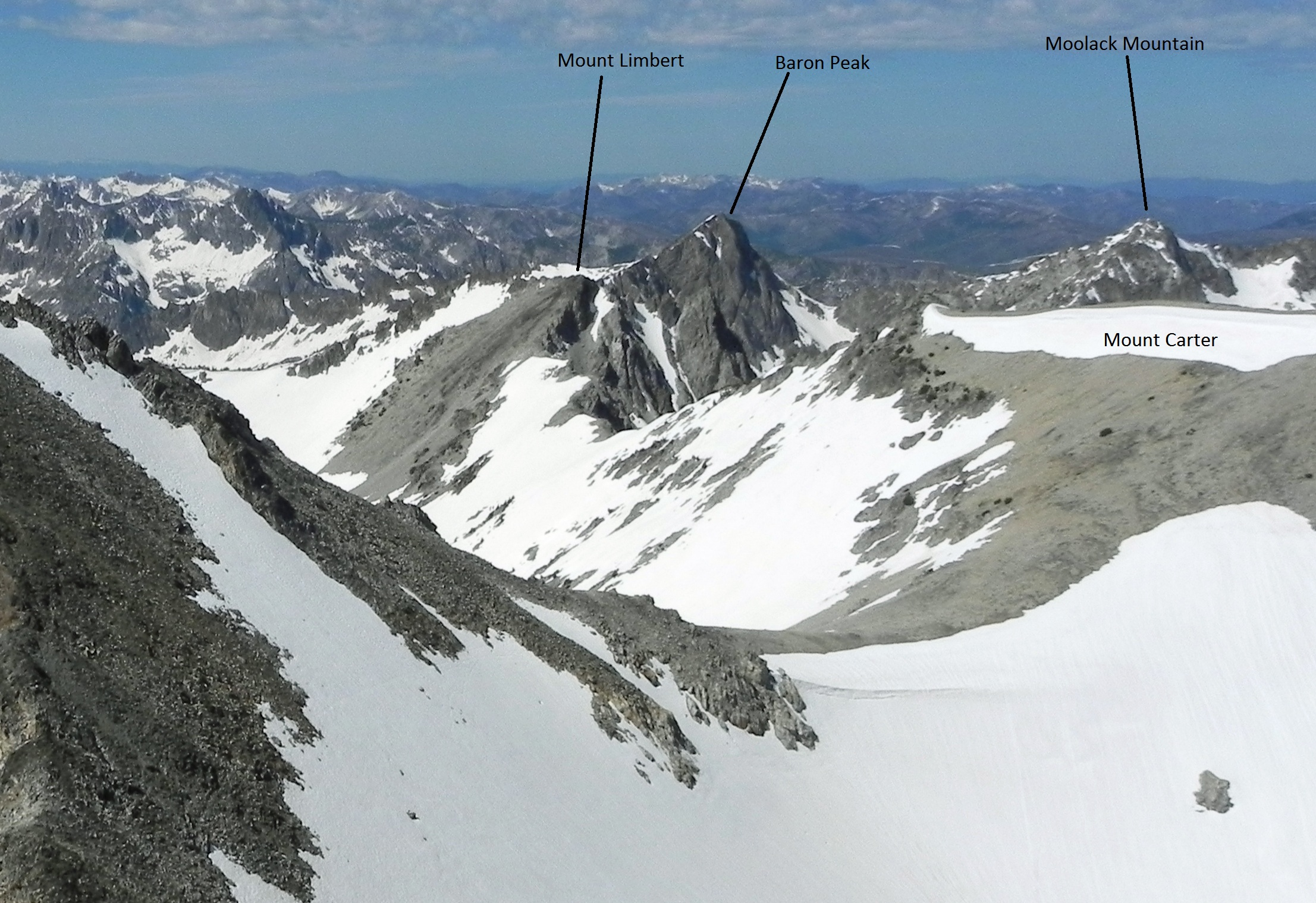
- Moolack Mountain from Thompson Peak

Highest point
- Elevation: 10,330 ft (3,150 m)
- Prominence: 810 ft (250 m)
- Parent peak: Mount Limbert
- Coordinates: 44°07′48″N 115°03′01″W

Geography
- Location within Idaho
- Location: Boise County, Idaho, U.S.
- Parent range: Sawtooth Range
- Topo map: USGS Stanley Lake

Climbing
- Easiest route: Scrambling, class 3

Moolack Mountain, also sometimes referred to as Baron Peak North, at 10,330 feet (3,150 m) above sea level is a peak in the Sawtooth Range of Idaho. The peak is located in the Sawtooth Wilderness of Sawtooth National Recreation Area in Boise County. The peak is located 1.3 mi (2.1 km) west of Mount Limbert, its line parent, and 0.5 mi (0.80 km) northwest of Baron Peak.

== See also ==
- List of peaks of the Sawtooth Range (Idaho)
- List of mountains of Idaho
- List of mountain peaks of Idaho
- List of mountain ranges in Idaho
