= Ottumwa, South Dakota =

Unincorporated hamlet in South Dakota, U.S.

Coordinates: 44°14′01″N 101°20′50″W

Ottumwa is an unincorporated community in Haakon County, in the U.S. state of South Dakota.

== History ==
A post office at Ottumwa was established in 1904, and remained in operation until 1983. The community takes its name from Ottumwa, Iowa, the native home of a share of the early settlers.
