= Wahsatch, Utah =

Wahsatch
- Ghost town
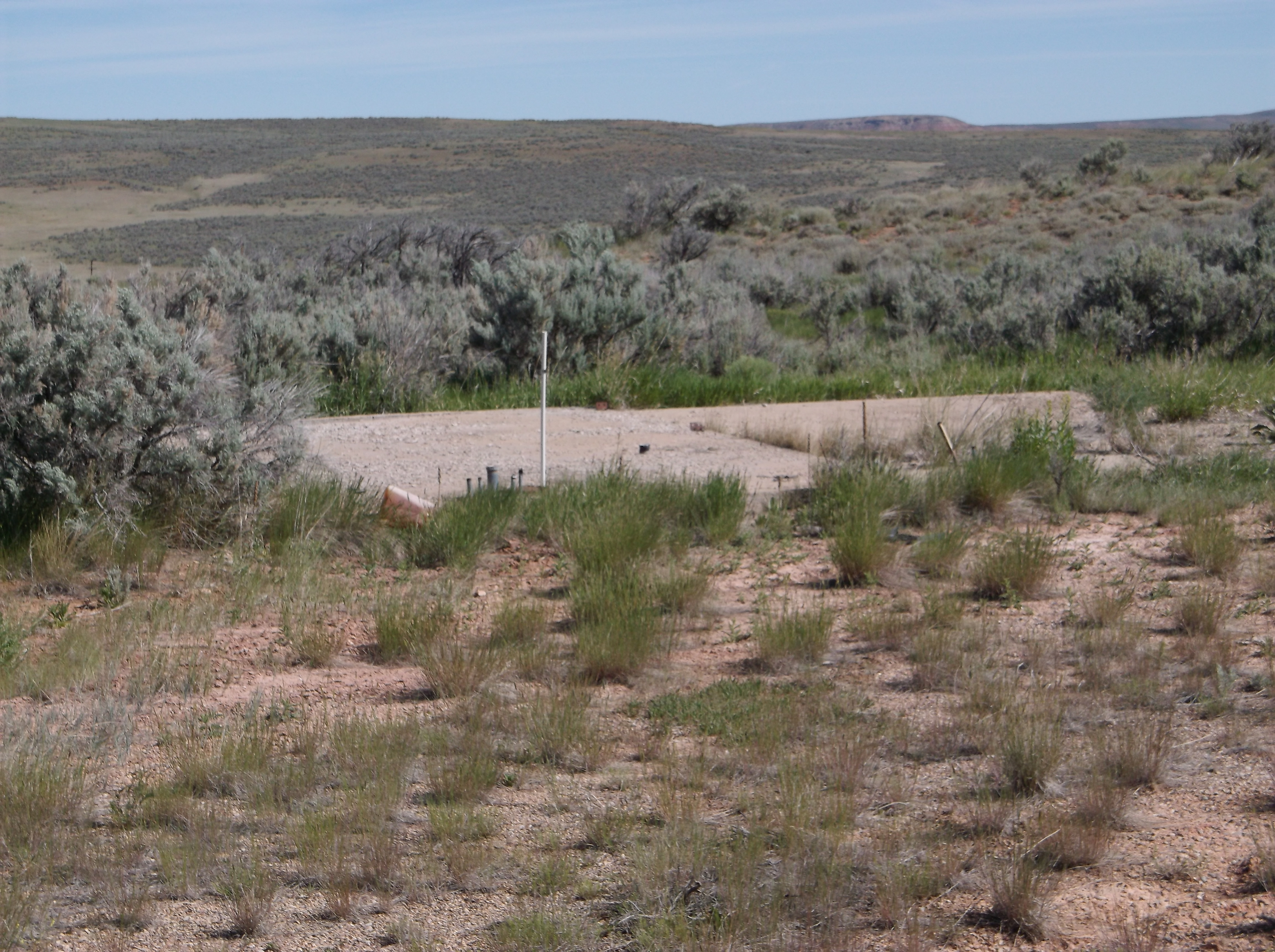
- Foundation at Wahsatch, June 2013

- Location within Utah Location within the United States
- Coordinates: 41°11′57″N 111°06′47″W
- Country: United States
- State: Utah
- County: Summit
- Established: 1868
- Abandoned: 1930s
- Named for: Wasatch Mountains
- Elevation: 6,820 ft (2,080 m)
- GNIS feature ID: 1437714

Wahsatch (/ˈwɑːsætʃ/ WAH-satch) is a ghost town in Summit County, Utah, United States. It lies along I-80 at the northeastern end of Echo Canyon some 23 miles (37 km) east of Echo, and 11 miles (18 km) west of Evanston, Wyoming. Wahsatch was established as a railroad camp, later achieving local prominence in sheep ranching. It was inhabited from 1868 until the 1930s.

== History ==
Wahsatch was established in 1868 as a railroad construction camp, the first of many such camps set up in Utah by the Union Pacific Railroad in the process of building the First transcontinental railroad. From 1868 to 1869, a population of hundreds dug the 772-foot (235 m) Echo tunnel through the Wasatch Mountains west of town. Wahsatch soon became a major supply station and railhead, with its own roundhouse, workshops, boarding houses, and warehouses. When the transcontinental railroad was finished in May 1869, a meal station for waiting passengers was constructed.

During the tunnel construction in 1868–1869, Wahsatch was known as a wild and lawless place. Laborers spent their wages immediately in tent saloons. Shootings were common, and at least one lynching was documented. Lacking a formal cemetery, the town buried its dead in makeshift hillside graves. This violent period was short-lived; in the early 1870s Wahsatch's development was outpaced by that of nearby Evanston, Wyoming, and the railroad moved most operations to Evanston. The population sharply dropped, and most of the buildings were demolished. Wahsatch became little more than a point for loading livestock.

Toward the end of the 19th century, Wahsatch enjoyed a minor rebirth as a location central to the area's growing sheep ranches. A number of new dwellings were built as ranchers and laborers began to gather here annually for sheep shearing season. In the spring of 1899 alone, an estimated 700,000 pounds (320,000 kg) of wool was sheared. In June 1903, it was reported that 489 carloads of sheep had arrived at Wahsatch from their winter range. The town grew enough to justify the building of a new school in 1910. In 1916, Wahsatch became the headquarters for the construction of a second railroad tunnel, bringing another temporary surge in population. The railroad built a new depot and section houses in the 1930s, but Wahsatch soon declined, along with the sheep industry. The town was abandoned in the 1930s.

The townsite on the north side of the highway is on railroad property, but the ruins on the south side are on a public road and can be accessed. Most visitors see little more than an old wooden sign reading Wahsatch alongside the tracks, but there are some remnants of railroad buildings and equipment.

== See also ==
- List of ghost towns in Utah
