= Guide Rock =

Guide Rock may refer to:

- Guide Rock (hill), a topographic feature in Webster County in south central Nebraska
- Guide Rock, Nebraska, a village in Webster County, Nebraska, named after a nearby hill
