= Skiri =

Skiri may refer to:

- Sciri, an East Germanic tribe
- Skidi, a sub-tribe of the Pawnee
