= Pahur =

Pahur may refer to:

- Pahur, Maharashtra, a city in India
- Guide Rock (hill), a landform in the United States, called "Pahur" in the Pawnee language
