= James Rolfe Murie =

Pawnee anthropologist and educator from Nebraska and Oklahoma, U.S.

- Sa-Ku-Ru-Ta
- Born: 1862; Grand Island, Nebraska, US
- Died: November 18, 1921 (aged 58–59)
- Resting place: North Indian Cemetery, Pawnee, Oklahoma
- Citizenship: Pawnee Nation of Oklahoma
- Education: Hampton Normal and Agricultural Institute
- Known for: Ethnography, anthropology, education
- Notable work: Ceremonies of Pawnee (1981)

James Rolfe Murie (1862 – November 18, 1921) was a Native American anthropologist, ethnographer, and educator. He was Skidi Pawnee and reached Pawnee culture, history, religion, and worldviews.

Murie wrote the Ceremonies of Pawnee, which included accounts of songs utilized in three South Band ceremonies, constituting one of the most extensive song collections for any Native American tribe ever described. Murie also collaborated with anthropologists Alice Fletcher, George Dorsey, and Clark Wissler.

== Early life and education ==
James Rolfe Murie, whose Pawnee name was Sa-Ku-Ru-Ta was born in 1862 in Grand Island, Nebraska to a Skiri Pawnee mother, Anna Murie, and a white father, James Murie. Murie's father was a Scottish immigrant who became a captain in Major Frank North's U.S. Army Pawnee scout battalion, which patrolled the Rocky Mountains in Colorado and Wyoming, protected the construction of the transcontinental railroad from raids, and safeguarded smaller settlements throughout the Plains. Murie's father rose from second lieutenant to captain, and in April 1869 re-enlisted in the scout battalion.

During the summer of 1869, Murie's father suffered from what was later identified as a mental illness and in 1871, was admitted to a mental institution. At this time, his wife and three children, including Murie, went to live with Anna Murie's brother. Murie was raised by his mother to speak Pawnee and participated in Pawnee tribal ceremonies. Murie claimed that his father died from a lightning strike while scouting with the battalion, but Murie's father was moved from the mental institution to the Soldiers and Sailors Home in Nebraska in 1888 and died there on December 26, 1910.

Although born in Nebraska, Murie lived part of his life in Oklahoma. In 1833, four Pawnee bands ceded their lands south of the Platte River, and in 1857 signed a treaty at Table Creek, Nebraska Territory, to accept a small reservation along the Platte River. The United States government removed the Pawnee from their Nebraska territory to Pawnee County, Oklahoma over a three-year period starting in 1874. A cholera epidemic in 1849, a smallpox epidemic in 1852, and continued conflict with the Sioux allowed the United States government to forcefully remove the Pawnee. The Pawnee Indian agencies and the Indian boarding school were established close to Pawnee, Oklahoma.

== Education ==
In 1879, Murie enrolled in the Hampton Normal and Agricultural Institute in Virginia. There he learned to read and write English and Arikara. Murie graduated in 1883. From 1883 to 1884, he taught at the Pawnee Agency boarding school, planning to become a full-time teacher. From 1884 to 1886, Murie served as the assistant disciplinarian and drillmaster at the Haskell Institute in Kansas. Murie also managed the post office in Pawnee, Oklahoma. By 1890, most of the Skiris lived in houses on their own farms and spoke English.

== Collaboration with anthropologists ==
Murie became a teacher and colleague to anthropologists studying Pawnee culture, including Alice C. Fletcher, George A. Dorsey, and Clark Wissler, by interpreting Pawnee language and culture. Many anthropologists greatly benefited from Murie's connection to Pawnee tribal members and his knowledge of English. In a letter to Alice Fletcher in 1898, Murie writes, "I have managed to get the Skee dee madicial [sic] man – a priest to stop with me tonight so he can give me lodge legend." Murie also remarks in a 1902 letter to Fletcher how "my people at this time have full confidence and trust in me."

In the mid-1890s, Murie worked with Alice Fletcher from the Peabody Museum of Harvard University to transcribe and translate Pawnee cultural materials, including songs. Fletcher collaborated with Murie and Tahriussawichi, a Pawnee Ku'rahus or ceremonial leader, to produce a description of a Calumet Ceremony, and Fletcher observed the Hako, a version of the Calumet Ceremony practiced by the Chauci clan of the Pawnee, one of the three South Bands. Fletcher published a book The hako: song, pipe, and unity in a Pawnee Calumet ceremony in which she transcribed and translated each Hako song and included its interpretation by a Pawnee Ku'rahus.

Murie was involved with sharing Pawnee culture with others. In January 1899, the American Anthropologist published the ceremony for changing a person's name performed by a Chauci Pawnee priest who was the friend of the Omaha chief Joseph La Flesche. Murie brought this priest to Washington, D.C. and helped to interpret his words during the ceremony.

== Collaboration with George Dorsey ==
Anthropologist George Dorsey was a curator of anthropology at the Field Museum between 1899 and 1915 and focused on the tribes of the Plains Indians between 1901 and 1907, including the Pawnee, Arapaho, and Cheyenne. Murie started working as Dorsey's full-time assistant in 1902, and Murie worked with Dorsey as an indigenous community scholar and interlocutor who participated in cross-cultural transfer of oral traditions along with Burgess Hunt (Wichita). Another key informant was Cleaver Warden (Southern Arapaho). In Monsters of Contact: Historical Trauma in Caddoan Oral Traditions (2018), Van de Logt address how Murie's family relationships as well acculturation through schooling and religion affected his collaboration with Dorsey like Warden. In a letter to Fletcher in 1901 or 1902, Murie remarked that he "was very very sorry to have to leave the work with you and go over to Dorsey- for his work is entirely different from yours."

Dorsey hired Murie, Hunt, and Warden to collect cultural information and objects from the Pawnee and Arapaho tribes. Murie also collected and transcribed ethnographic data related to the Skidi Pawnee, including Pawnee ceremonial material obtained from a monolingual Skiri Pawnee priest, Roaming Scout. These texts were key for Douglas Parks and Lula Pratt's A Dictionary of Skiri Pawnee, published in 2008 because they document a Pawnee style without English stylistic influence. Murie also communicated with Dorsey to inform him when Pawnee ceremonies were taking place and provided information on his own experiences of language, mythology, and symbolism.

Dorsey's collaboration with Murie ended in 1907, when Dorsey was to publish a manuscript about the Pawnee, funded by the Carnegie Institution of Washington, called The Pawnee: Mythology (1906). Dorsey and Murie were both listed as the authors. Much of Murie's work for the Field Museum remains unpublished. Douglas Parks traced the history of the collaboration between Dorsey and Murie referring to narratives told by Roaming Scout, a Pawnee priest, that were recorded by Dorsey and Murie during their work together.

After his work with Dorsey ended, Murie continued to work for the Bureau of American Ethnology and the American Museum of Natural History. In 1915, Murie conducted the Morning Star ceremony himself. The Pawnee had identified 24 stars and 15 constellations on a star chart painted on a buckskin hide that was currently housed in the Field Museum. Chamberlain utilized Murie's data to show how this document depicted stars of religious and ritual significance for the Skidi Pawnee. The National Anthropological Archives currently houses a Pawnee star chart with a two-page explanation from James Murie written on June 24, 1911.

== Ceremonies of the Pawnee (1981) ==
Murie also described Pawnee cultural material in a book produced in collaboration with anthropologist Clark Wissler, Ceremonies of Pawnee. The Ceremonies of Pawnee is made of two volumes including work created over a ten-year period. The first volume was completed in 1921 by Murie and Wissler under the American Museum of Natural History, and Murie describes the Skiri band. Murie described the cyclical Skiri ceremonies and the role of sacred bundles in the Skiri culture. The first volume is an example of participant observant involving collaboration between a Pawnee informant and an ethnographer.

The second volume focuses on the South Bands, including the Pitahawirata, Chawi, and Kitkahahki, which Murie created for the Bureau of American Anthropology. In the second volume, Murie details three rituals, the White Beaver Ceremony, the Bear Dance, and the Buffalo Dance. The songs of the ceremony are written in Pawnee and English. Murie provides interpretive comments on Pawnee songs, including songs involved in the sacred bundle ceremonies and doctor's songs from Pawnee elders. Murie also produced a Pawnee star chart describing cosmology.

This two-volume work was supposed to be published by the Smithsonian in 1921, but the length of the manuscript delayed publication until 60 years later in 1981. Douglas Park prepared it for publication. In the 1981 publication, Murie's song texts, transcribed in his own phonemic alphabet, were removed and replaced by phonetic transcriptions and morpheme by morpheme translations from Gene Weltfish.

== Later life ==
Although Murie contributed to the field of anthropology through his work with Fletcher and Dorsey, his work often goes uncredited. Ralph Linton produced two leaflets – Purification of the Sacred Bundles, A Ceremony of the Pawnee (1923) and The Sacrifice to the Morning Star by the Skidi Pawnee (1922) – published by the Field Museum of Natural History Department of Anthropology in 1922 and 1923. In these pamphlets, Linton often copied descriptions of Pawnee ceremonies verbatim from field notes produced by George Dorsey and James Murie. Linton mentions Dorsey but does not mention James Murie.

Murie died on November 18, 1921. Murie was included in Margot Liberty's American Indian Intellectuals and an obituary about Murie's life appeared on the front page of the Pawnee Democrat (newspaper from Pawnee, Oklahoma) on November 24, 1921.

The National Anthropological Archives contains correspondence between James R. Murie and Alice Fletcher in the Alice Fletcher and Frances La Flesche papers between 1898 and 1905, even when Murie was working for Dorsey. The National Anthropological Archives also house The Ceremonies of the Pawnee, with 18 photographs. The Field Museum Anthropological Archives also holds Murie's "Pawnee Ethnographic and Linguistic Notes” from his work with Dorsey which are largely unpublished.

== Published works ==
- Dorsey, George A.; Murie, James R. (1940) Notes on Skidi Pawnee Society. Chicago: Field Museum of Natural History.
- Murie, James R. (1941) Pawnee Indian Societies. New York: The Trustees.
- Murie, James R. (1981). Parks, Douglas R. (ed.). Ceremonies of the Pawnee. Washington, D.C.: Smithsonian Institution Press.
