= Effects of white settler contact on the Pawnee tribe =

The effects of white settler contact on the Pawnee tribe were considerable. Firstly, the tribe ceded its land in Nebraska which it had held since the 16th century and was relocated to Oklahoma. Secondly, despite generally having peaceful relations with settlers, there was a loss of life from European-introduced diseases. Lastly came the adoption of European customs, and culture.

The Pawnee are a tribe of North American Indigenous people. The tribe was known for peaceful relations with white settlers, earning the classification of a "friendly tribe". The Pawnee were made up of four bands or subtribes: the Kitkehahki, Chaui, Pitahauerat, and Skidi. These bands lived apart from each other, giving the collective tribe a nature of decentralization.

== Loss of land ==
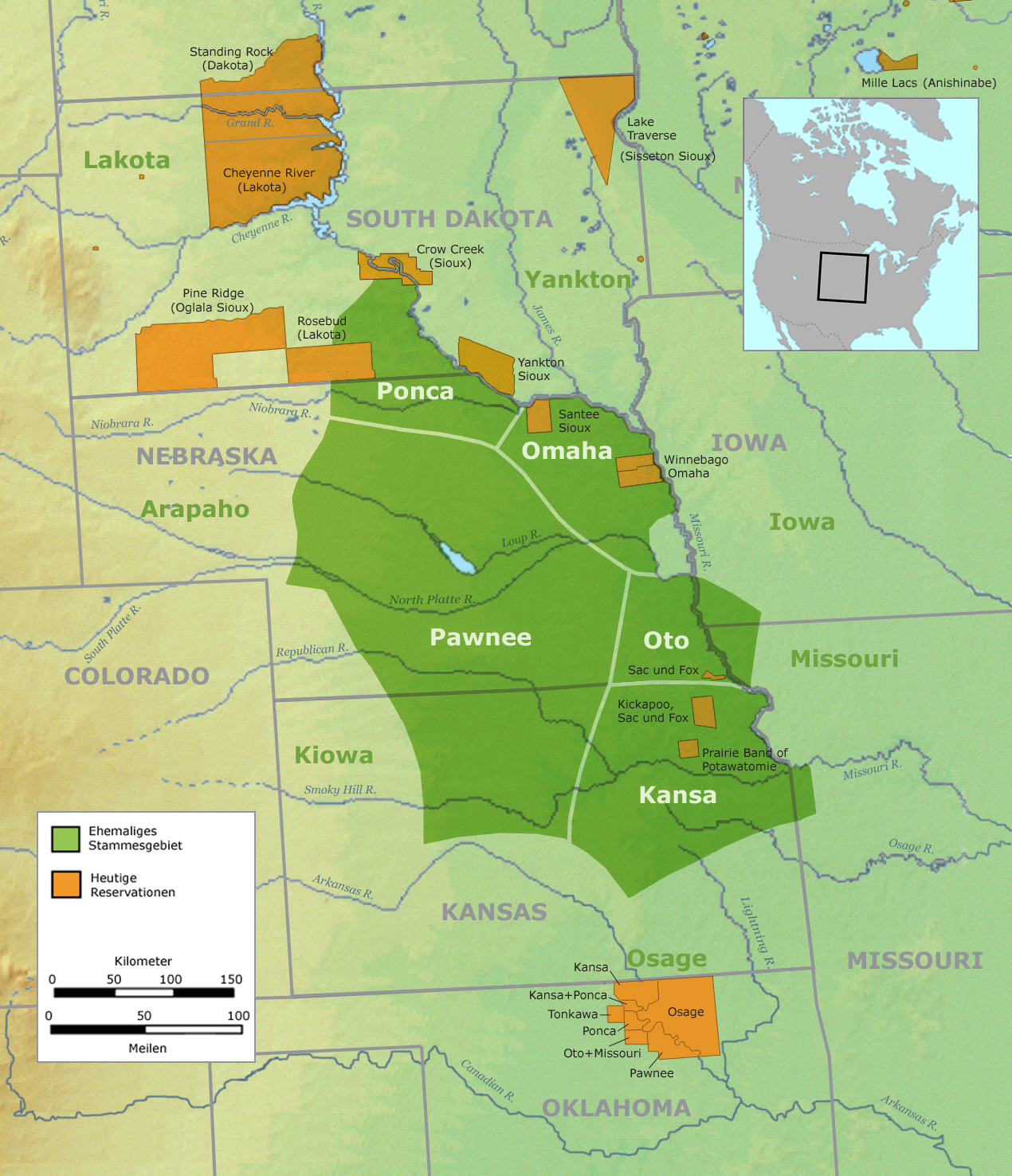
The Pawnee lived on the Platte River until they were removed from Nebraska by the United States government in the late 19th century.

The Pawnee lived on a river in what is now Nebraska for the entirety of their existence before European contact in the 1540s and well into the 19th century. However, over time the Pawnee ceded most of their land in Nebraska to the United States government through 19th century treaties. The four Pawnee subtribes gave up their lands south of the Platte River in an 1833 treaty. The tribe was then forced onto a small reservation area on the Loup Fork of the Platte River in an 1857 treaty. By 1874, the tribe had lost all of its land in Nebraska and had been moved to Oklahoma.

== Loss of life ==
The Pawnee generally had peaceful relations with settlers, but this resulted in many negative outcomes. Most conspicuously, involvement with settlers brought massive loss of life to the tribe. The Pawnee suffered from European-introduced diseases, losing over a thousand people to a cholera outbreak in 1849 and suffering further reductions as a result of smallpox in 1852. In addition, the Pawnee suffered losses at the hands of other Plains tribes following their agreement to give up their weapons at the 1833 treaty and become yeoman farmers. The Pawnee also became involved in international conflicts between the French, Spanish, and Americans.

The Pawnee had a population between 7,000 and 10,000 people in the early 19th century that dropped to around 2,500 by 1875.

== Europeanization ==
The Europeans also exerted a strong push to Europeanize the Pawnee beginning in the mid-18th century. The Pawnee resisted, but were forced to adopt European customs after 1854 when they were moved to the small reservation.

=== Goods and services ===
As a result of European contact, horses and guns were introduced into Pawnee culture by around 1750, combining with the record of trade goods to pinpoint that as the time that settlers became more involved in Pawnee culture. Guns came to replace bow and arrows as the Pawnee's primary weapon just after the turn of the 19th century.

The additions of horses and guns had separate but similar effects that made the Pawnee more powerful in the short term. They had been struggling with attacks from other Plains tribes for years, unable to defend themselves effectively due to their decentralized nature. Horses initially served a small role as more powerful versions of dogs in order to haul supplies, but Pawnee herds numbered between 6,000 and 8,000 by the early 19th century (4). The presence of horses made the Pawnee more proficient in hunting buffalo but introduced the distinctly European concept of division of wealth.

The British, eager to arm any potential enemies of the Spanish as European powers fought for North America, supplied the Pawnee with guns. The Pawnee gained a distinct fighting advantage over other Plains tribes that lacked this trade relationship with European traders, becoming the dominant tribe of the area into the 19th century. However, they lost this edge in the aforementioned 1833 treaty.

Settlers introduced a variety of trade goods into Pawnee culture. European trade goods were a proportionately insignificant percentage of Pawnee materials for 200 years after first contact in the mid-16th century, but accelerated after 1750. Europeans introduced artifacts into all aspects of Pawnee culture, from weapons (iron knives and lead bullets) and tools (awls and axes) to accessories (buttons, bracelets, and brass bells) and ceramics (porcelain and salt glazed stoneware).

==== Archeological record ====
Excavation projects carried out between 1930 and 1941 and catalogued by the Nebraska State Historical Society and other published sources portray a development toward European artifacts among Pawnee from 1571 to 1867. The study shows that hardly any European artifacts from before 1800 were found at Pawnee sites, followed by an explosion in European artifacts from 1800 on. By 1833, European artifacts had almost completely replaced those of the Pawnee.

=== Religion ===
The Pawnee had a distinct and developed religion built on geographical landmarks and elaborate ritualism before European contact. Priests presided over rituals that commemorated the people's belief in their heavenly origins, and doctors attributed their healing ability to shamanistic powers. The Pawnee believed that animals were the "terrestrial media for celestial gods", serving as a sort of lower deity that enabled doctors. Therefore, animals were prominently involved in Pawnee religion. However, those traditions disappeared or were marginalized as the tribe became more Europeanized.

The greatest example of a change in Pawnee religion as a result of white settler contact was the disappearance of the Morning Star ceremony. Members of one village (Village Across a Hill) in the Skidi subtribe regularly sacrificed a young girl as part of their creation belief, believing that it assisted the renewal of the earth and its resources. The practice took place throughout the 1810s, despite U.S. "Indian agents" warning that white settlers would not like it, and news of the ceremony reached the Eastern U.S. around 1820. A group of leaders in the village began to oppose the ritual because of white disapproval, and the last known example occurred in 1838.
