= Ute music =

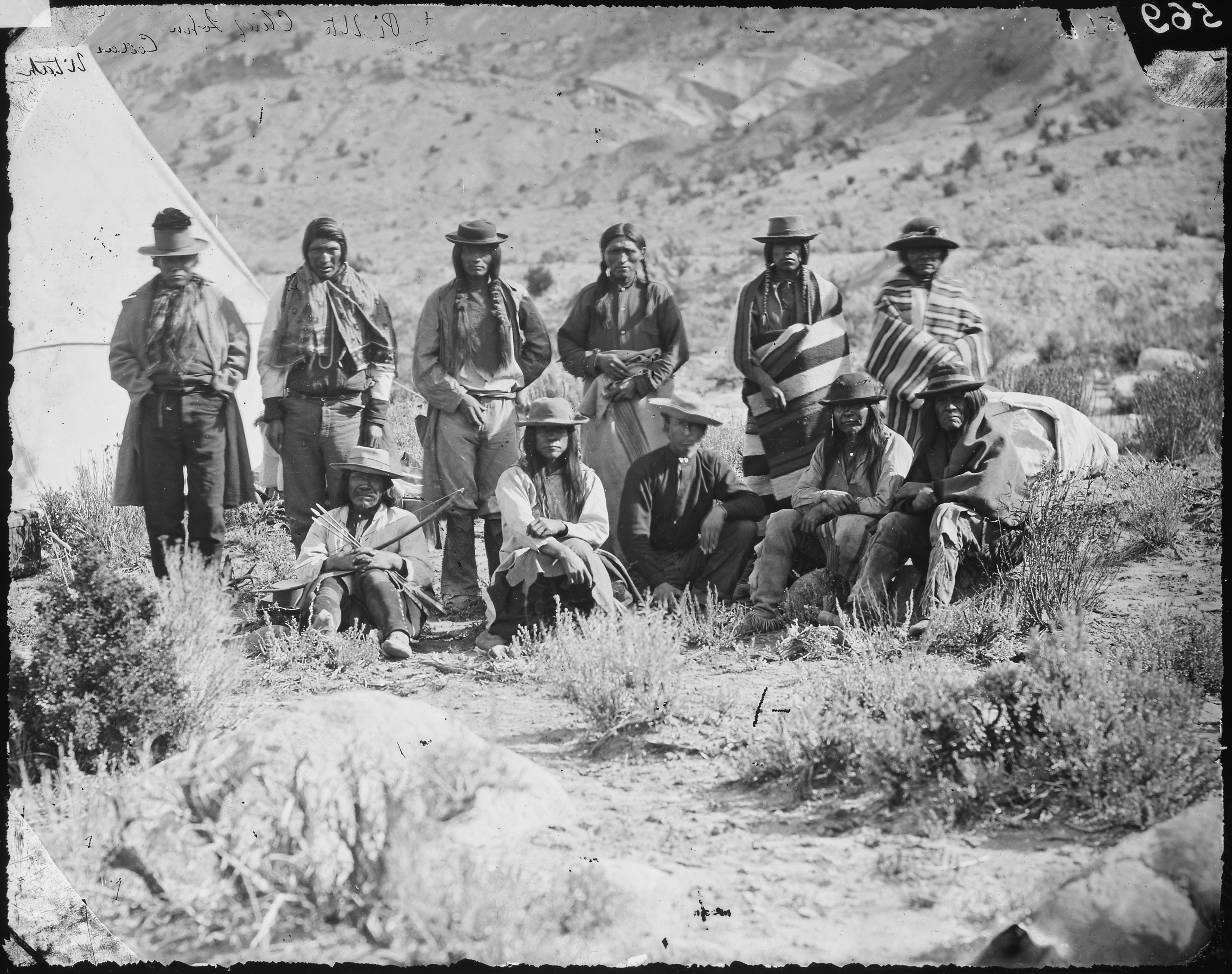
Group of Native American Utes

Ute music constitutes the music of the Indigenous Northern American Ute tribe. Much of this music has been recorded and preserved. Each song of the Ute tribe has a meaning or is based on an experience. These experiences may be social, religious or emotional. Many Ute songs are social songs. They include war songs, social dance songs, parade songs, medicine songs, love songs, game songs and story songs.

== Background ==
Similar to other Indigenous American music, much of Ute music is about or inspired by nature. These people even referred to nature as "mother," indicating how sacred they held it. Many Ute songwriters, particularly from Northern Ute tribes, have also claimed to have received their music through dreams.

Like most indigenous people, the Ute Native Americans in the Great Basin struggled with people traveling into their land and trying to take over, such as the Spanish and the Mormons. Their music continued to be a light for their people through these times.

== General characteristics ==
Most songs are chants. There are few lyrics. The expression of the histories and meanings of the songs rely more heavily on the emotions of the singer than the words sung. The singing is done with a guttural tight tone, and the tone is never clear or even. One Ute singer described proper singing tone to resemble singing while riding a galloping horse.

Ranges are usually more narrow and often remain within an octave. Most songs tend to start on higher notes and descend down to lower registers as the song progresses. Tones may sound flat or sharp to some because natural modes are used rather than pursuing accuracy of pitch. The majority of these tones remain consistent.

Like most Native American music, Ute music does not have rhythmic groups such as measures.

== Instrumentation ==
The Utes use common Native American musical instruments for their war and dance songs. These include the morache, hand drum, large drum, and the flageolet.

=== Morache ===
The morache has been a common instrument among indigenous American tribes. Mr. E. H. Hawley, curator of musical instruments at the United States National Museum in Washington D.C., described it simply as a "notched stick rattle with resonator." It is played by rubbing a short stick or bone across a longer stick with notches cut into its side. Originally, the sound was resonated by placing one end of the longer stick on a shallow basket. However, many have now come to use a piece of zinc instead of the basket.

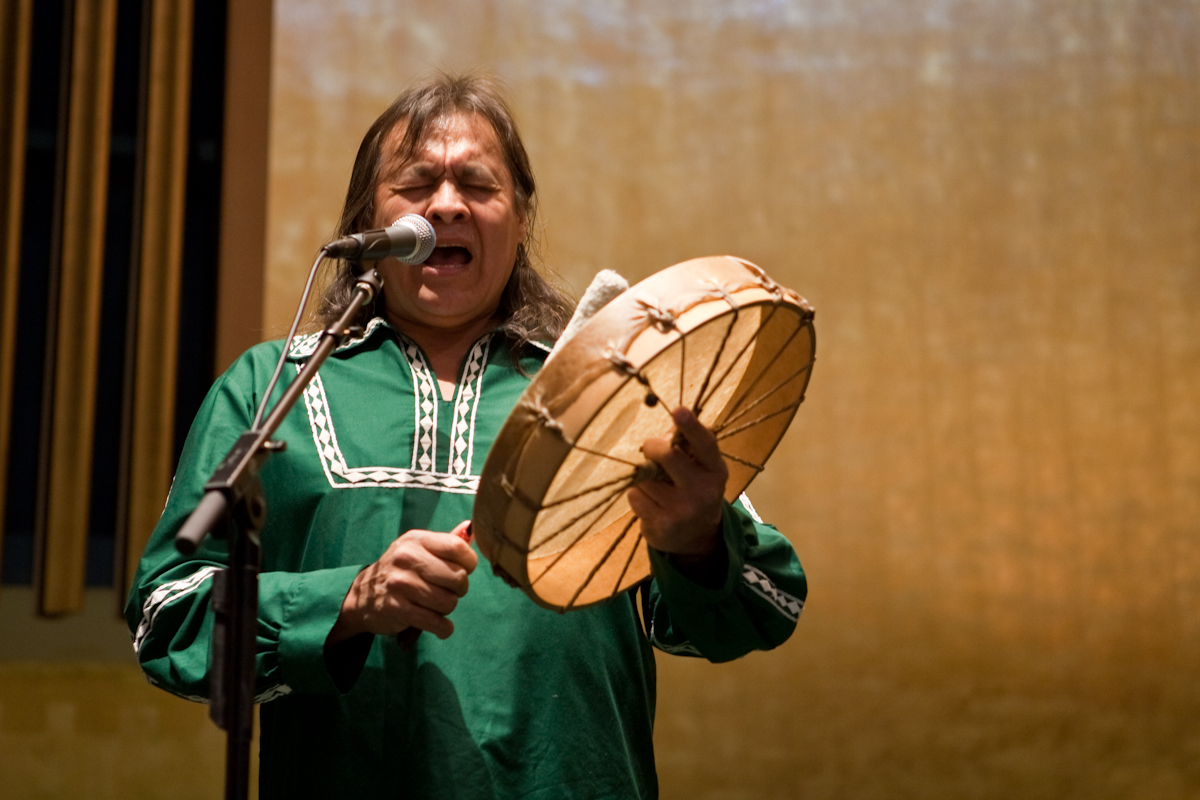
Indigenous American hand drum

=== Hand drum ===
The hand drum is a small drum, about 12 inches in diameter. It is fashioned with a piece of wood bent into a circle. A wet skin head is stretched across the head, with holes in the skin corresponding to holes in the wood to secure the skin to the wood. A handle is made from two strips of cotton cloth, with a strip of cloth tying them together in the middle of the drum to form a cross. The drum is played by hitting the skin with a drumstick formed out of a round stick with a head of white cloth wrapped around one of the ends.

=== Large drum ===
For some dances, such as the Turkey dance and Women's dance, a much larger drum was formed. Anywhere from 8 to 10 singers will sit around this drum, singing as they drum. There have been known to be as many as 14 seated around the drum.

=== Flageolet ===
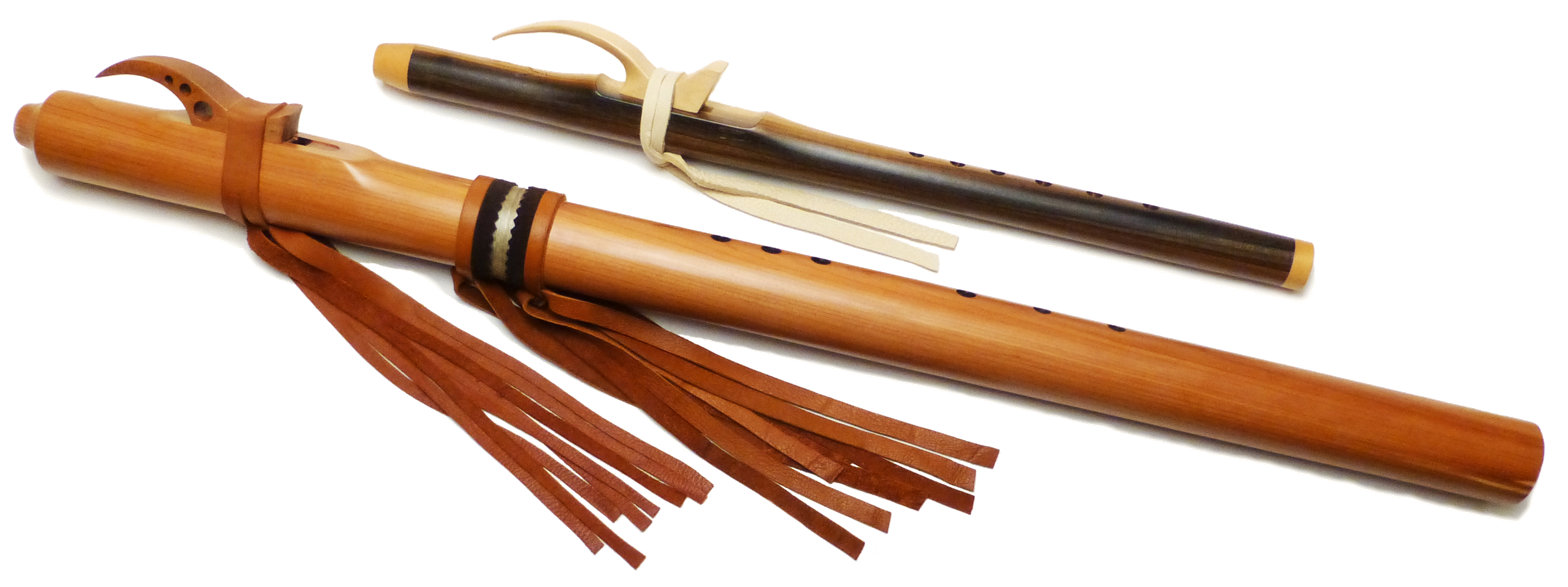
Examples of Native American woodwind instruments

The flageolet is a form of wind instrument. It is similar to flageolets used by other indigenous American tribes, and somewhat resembles a common flageolet. It is made from a straight piece of wood. The piece is hollowed by splitting it in half, removing the pith, and gluing the pieces back together. It is approximately 11 inches long, and just over an inch wide in diameter. The instrument is played through a whistle mouthpiece, and covering a number of the 6 sound holes with the fingers. It is known to have good tone, and was sometimes moistened to improve quality of the tone. The Ute flageolet was said to have an extended range but was specific to Indian music. A creator and player of the flageolet in a Ute tribe once said "American song tunes cannot be played on it but Indian music can be played on it."

=== Vocal ===
A major aspect of Ute music is the singing. Native American singing is in many ways unique and the vocal method, according to American anthropologist Frances Densmore, can be difficult to describe. Common features include an exaggerated tremolo and a certain approach where the tone is sung sharp then quickly slides down to the sustained tone. A Native American singer will use a contraction of the glottis to separate tones, which allows for distinct short note values for eighth and sixteenth notes without having to use words or syllables.

== Dancing ==
The music of the Utes is also accompanied by dance. The dancing is filled with symbolism.

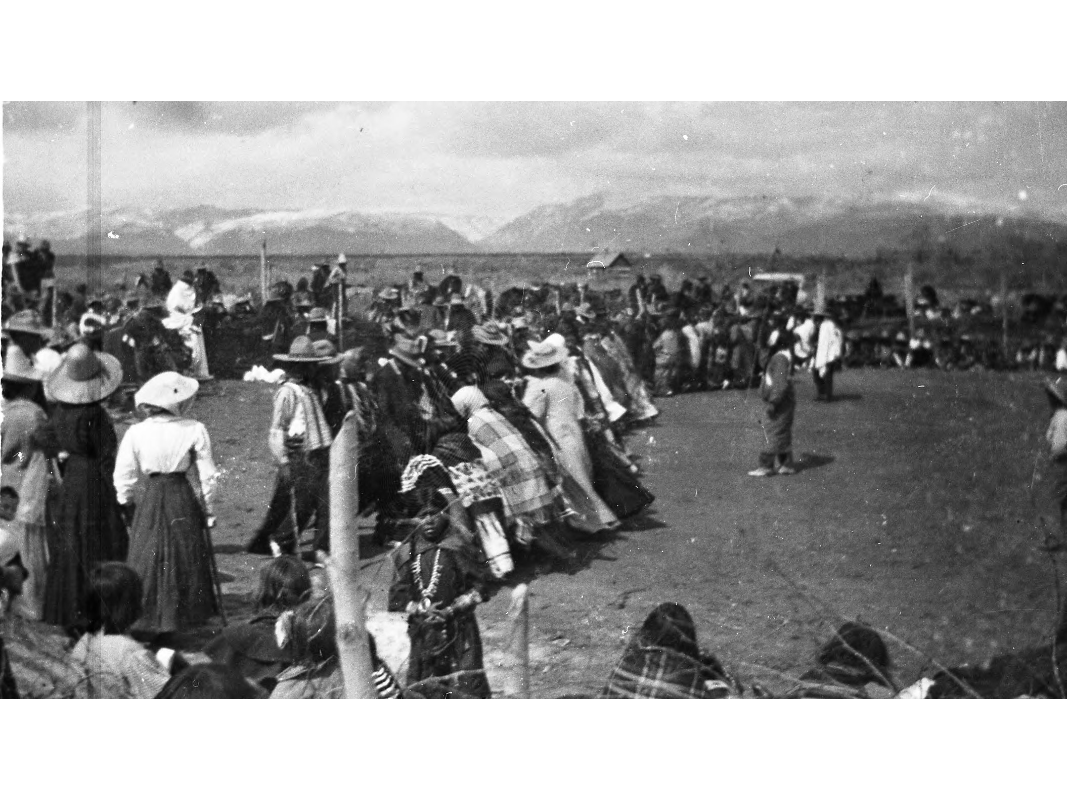
A group of Ute people participating in the Bear Dance

=== Ute Bear Dance ===
An iconic ceremonial dance of the Ute tribe is the Bear Dance. There are many different Bear dance songs with complex rhythms and melodies. They are often sung and danced at festivals lasting multiple days, up to a week, such as the Tam-Nam Nacup Springtime Festival. Some claim the dance was originally used as a courting dance, but today it is mostly a dance of sociability and general good feeling.

==== Origin ====
The Ute Bear Dance comes from a common story told by the leaders of the tribe. The dance is said to be as old as the culture itself. There are many different versions of the story. One common recounting is about a Ute man who goes out to hunt at the end of winter. As he was traveling, he sees a bear emerge from a cave that it had been sleeping in all winter. As it walks outside it starts to dance, moving forward and backward. As the man is watching from afar he is afraid to move closer because the bear might attack him. He studies the movement of the bear from afar. He likes what he sees and goes back to tell the people about what he had learned.

==== Music ====
The music involves singing as well as drums and a morache. The morache is used to produce a growling cry meant to imitate the howl of a bear. Glissandos on downward progressions are also used to imitate bear sounds. There is a steady drum beat played as the morache is grated up and down. The rhythm is more monotonous and the rhythmic sense is stronger than the melodic sense. The Bear dance is typically sung only by the men.

==== Dance ====
The dance itself comes from the story to which previously referred. It is named Mamaqui Mawats, meaning "to move forward and back." This relates to the way the bear moved as he came out of the cave. It begins with a member of the band approaching the band leader, requesting to give the dance. This request could be accepted or declined. It is more of a social dance, but has some religious aspects as well. The dance is led by the Bear Dance leader, who was the man who initiated the dance with the band. The dance involves men and women, who face different directions. The women face toward the band and the men face toward the east, the opposite direction that women are facing.

==== Religious beliefs about the dance ====
Ute belief holds that they descended from bears. The bear is considered the wisest of all the animals. Long ago it was believed that the Ute people would turn into bears before they died. While they believe transfiguration ended long ago and doesn't occur to those living today, they still maintain special connection with the bears, as they still believe they are distantly related. The dance itself created a bridge between the people and their ancestors. It became sacred to those participating. All things considered, it is commonly known as a social dance, and those involved have a lot of fun.

== Documentation and ethnology ==
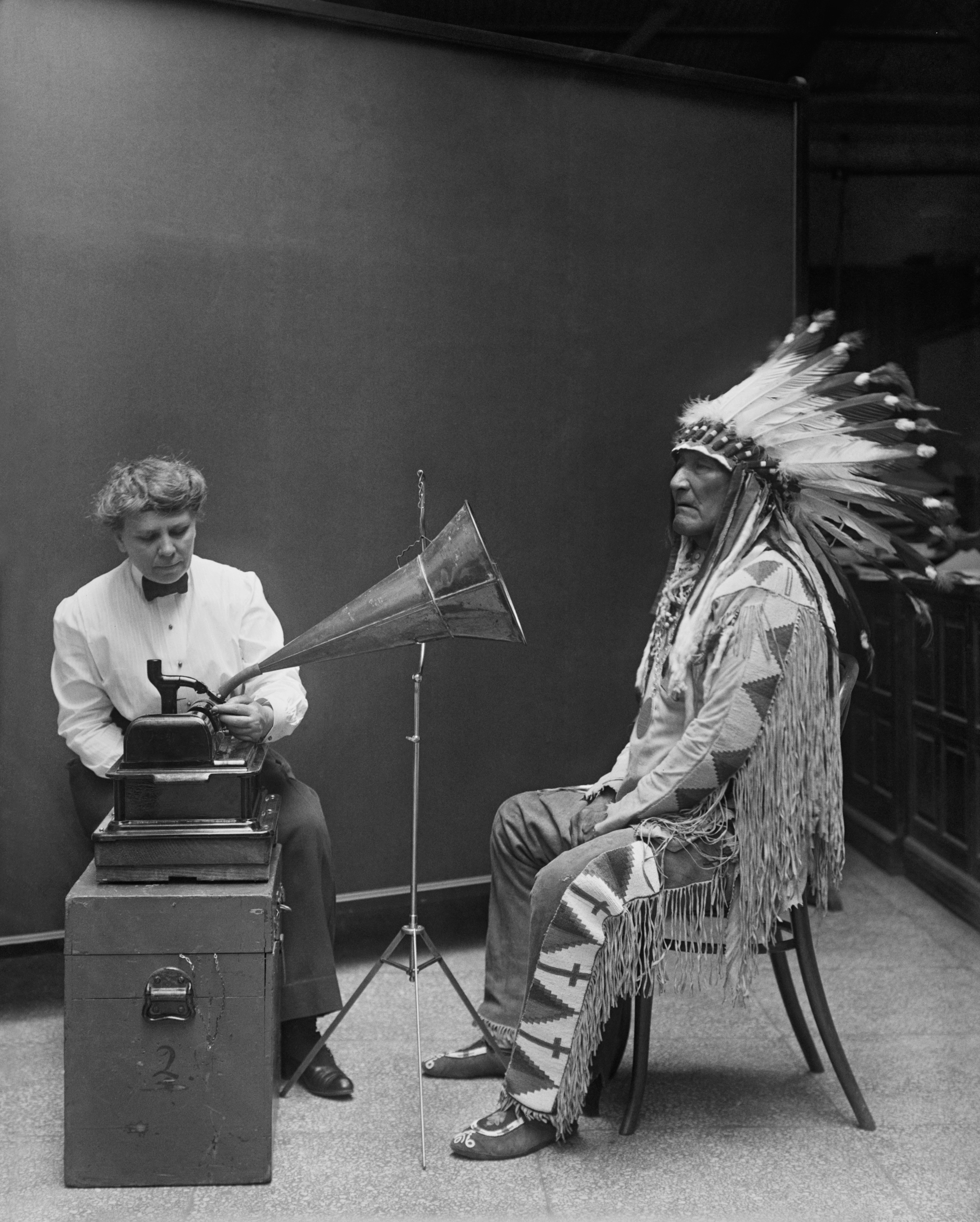
Frances Densmore recording Mountain Chief with phonograph

Ute folklore songs have been handed down for generations. They were never written down. Rather, they were always learned by rote. However, since the beginning of the twentieth century, many anthropologists and ethnologists have worked to preserve and archive this music.

=== Frances Densmore ===
Frances Densmore was one of the primary contributors to the thorough documentation of the music of over 30 different Indian tribes in the United States and Canada, including the Ute tribe. Her primary tools were a phonograph cylinder recorder and a box camera. Most of her studies were done under the support of the Bureau of American Ethnology, for which she was hired between 1907 and 1933, and again after 1939. Over the years of study, she came to develop a theory of Indian music, recognizing and appreciating the distinction between the interpretation of its melodies and harmonies and that of Western music.

As part of her years of research for the Bureau of American Ethnology of the Smithsonian Institution, she recorded 3,591 cylinders of indigenous music and analysis thereof. These were later transferred to the National archives and then to the Library of Congress. There they were duplicated onto 16-inch acetate discs. By 1915 about 900 songs had been phonographically recorded, and over the cumulative course of her work for the Smithsonian over 2,400 songs were transcribed. This is considered one of the "great recorded treasures of the American people." Her ethnological contributions to the preservation of Ute music are extensive.

=== Opposition to documentation ===
There are some who oppose the documentation of indigenous music, specifically the work of Frances Densmore. A woman by the name of Marcie Rendon wrote a play titled: "Song Catcher: A Native Interpretation of the Story of Frances Densmore". Rendon is an American indigenous woman herself and has rejected Frances Densmore's work, primarily because Densmore did not belong to the same culture. The play goes into detail about how Densmore's work could be considered an invasion of privacy. Set in modern day, from the perspective of indigenous people, it considers how such a study could be harmful to those being studied. Along with Rendon, some Native American people argue that the indigenous music should remain within their society.
