= Pahuk =

- U.S. National Register of Historic Places
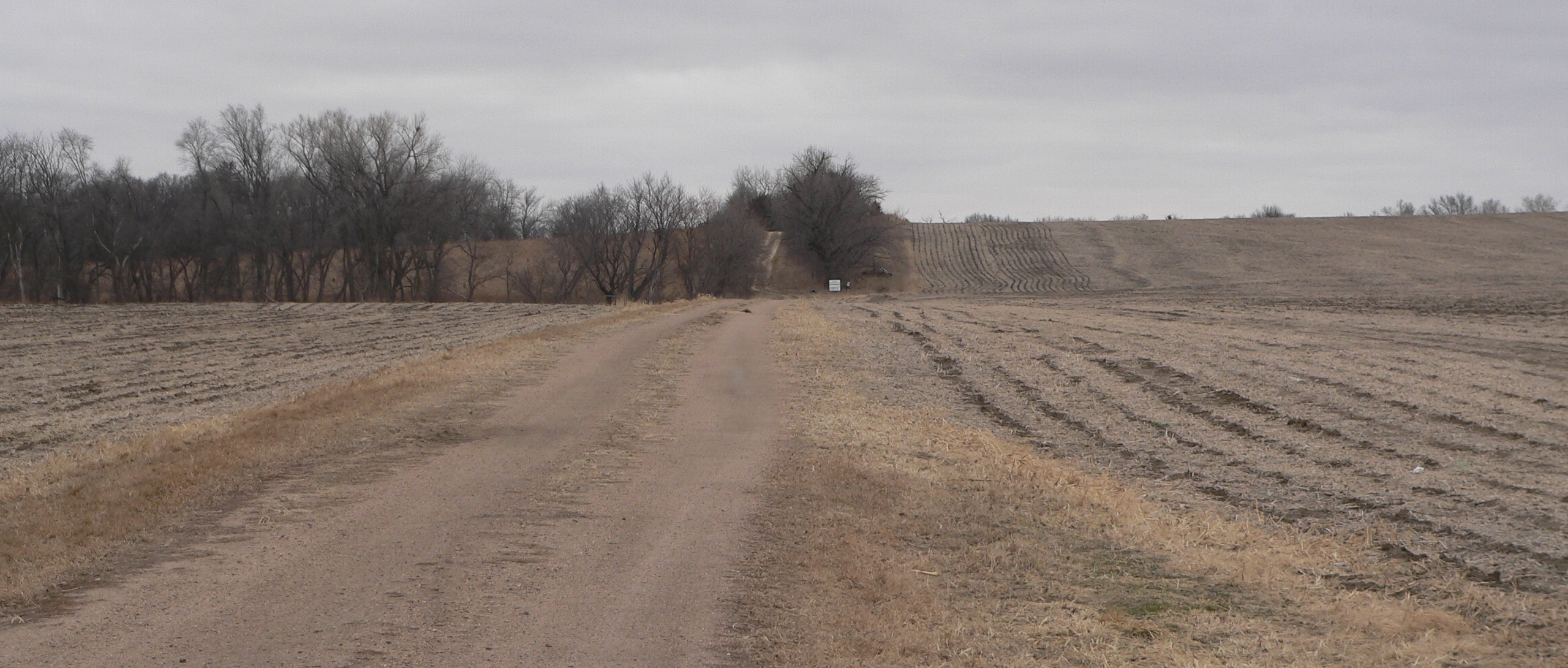
- Pahuk, seen from the south
- Nearest city: Cedar Bluffs, Nebraska
- Area: 85 acres (34 ha)
- NRHP reference No.: 73001074
- Added to NRHP: August 14, 1973

Pahuk, also written Pahaku, or Pahuk Hill, is a bluff on the Platte River in eastern Nebraska in the United States. In the traditional Pawnee religion, it was one of five dwellings of spirit animals with miraculous powers. The Pawnee occupied three villages near Pahuk in the decade prior to their removal to the Pawnee Reservation on the Loup River in 1859.

Pahuk is listed in the National Register of Historic Places.

== Description ==
Pahuk was defined by erosion of the Platte River and tributary gullies into the plain south of the river. The north side of the bluff is a near-vertical face rising 150 feet (46 m) from the river. The east and west sides are delimited by deep and steep-sided gullies about 1,000 feet (300 m) apart. The ground dips slightly to the south; there is a gentle rise about 40 feet (12 m) high near the bluff edge, making Pahuk the highest point for several miles in any direction.

== Pawnee tradition ==
The Pawnee name "Pahuk" is generally translated as "hill island". The accent is on the second syllable; the vowel in the first syllable is pronounced like the "a" in "father"; and the "u" is pronounced short, as in "us". More recently, the name has often been rendered "Pahaku".

In the Pawnee traditional religion, the supreme being Tirawa conferred miraculous powers on certain animals. These spirit animals, the nahurac, act as Tirawa's messengers and servants, and can intercede with him on behalf of the Pawnee.

The nahurac had five underground lodges, of which Pahuk was one. The others were Lalawakohtito, or "dark island", an island in the Platte near present-day Central City, Nebraska; Ahkawitakol, or "white bank", on the Loup River opposite the mouth of the Cedar River in what is now Nance County, Nebraska; Pahur, or "hill that points the way", a bluff south of the Republican River near its namesake Guide Rock, Nebraska; and Kitzawitzuk, translated "water on a bank", a spring on the bank of the Solomon River near Glen Elder, Kansas, also known to the Pawnee as Pahowa, but generally called today by its Kaw name of Waconda Spring.

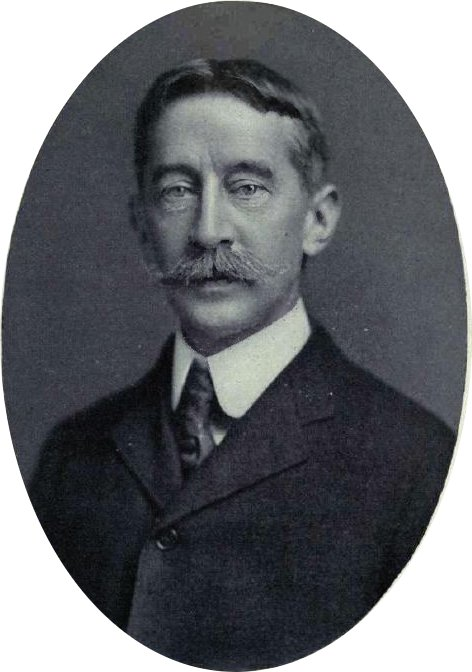
George Bird Grinnell

The nahurac who met at Pahuk were regarded as the most powerful. They figure in two of the Pawnee tales recounted by George Bird Grinnell. In "A Story of Faith", a young doctor is poisoned by a rival. Sick and miserable, he wanders until he unwittingly arrives at Pahuk. He is brought into the lodge, but before the doctor animals there will essay to cure him, they send him to the other four nahurac dwellings. At all of these, the doctors admit that curing him is beyond their powers, and acknowledge the leadership of those at Pahuk. The man is then returned to Pahuk, where the doctors cure him and instruct him in their secrets. He returns to his home, where he uses the magic he has learned to destroy the doctor who poisoned him, pouring his enemy's flesh and blood into the river to feed the nahurac.

In "The Boy who was Sacrificed", a man sacrifices his dearly-loved son to Tirawa, killing the boy with a knife and throwing him into the Platte. The boy's corpse drifts downstream to Pahuk, where the kingfisher messenger of the nahurac finds him and implores the spirit animals to restore him to life. The nahurac of Pahuk send the messenger to the other four lodges to ask what should be done with the boy; but the animals there are unable to make the decision, and it is left to the nahurac at Pahuk. Petitioned earnestly by the messenger bird, they bring the boy back to life, then teach him their secrets. He returns to his village and becomes a great doctor.

In a Pawnee creation story recounted by Mari Sandoz, the first people and animals awoke from a sleep underground, and emerged onto the earth's surface through a hole on Pahuk.

== History ==
In the 1850s, three Pawnee villages were located in the vicinity of Pahuk. The Skidi (Wolf Pawnee) had established a village at the McClean Site on the bluff between 1847 and 1850. By 1855, the Skidi had been joined by the Pitahauerats (Tapage Pawnee), and the village had been fortified against Sioux attack with a sod wall. The Chaui (Grand Pawnee) were in a village at the Leshara Site, about four miles southeast of the Skidi, near present-day Leshara, Nebraska. A third village, probably of the Kitkehahki (Republican Pawnee) was located on the south bank of the Platte west of the Skidi.

In 1857, the Pawnee, under pressure from white settlers and Sioux attacks, signed a treaty giving up all claims to land in Nebraska in exchange for a reservation on the Loup River in present-day Nance County, Nebraska. In 1859, the Mormon settlers of the town of Genoa on the reservation were evicted, and an agency built there. In that same year, the Pawnee left the villages near Pahuk for their summer buffalo hunt; shortly after they had departed, the villages were burned, either by Sioux raiders or by settlers. The destruction of the villages and the hope of obtaining government protection from the Sioux drove the Pawnee to leave the Platte and move to the reservation.

In 1858, the Nebraska Territorial Legislature, meeting in Florence, voted to move the territorial capital from Omaha to Pahuk, which they dubbed "Capitol Hill", and on which they proposed to build a capital city named Neapolis. Although a majority of the members of the legislature had been present at the Florence session, Governor William Alexander Richardson refused to recognize its actions, on the grounds that it had not met at Omaha, the legitimate seat of government. The nascent Neapolis community was soon abandoned.

Pahuk was claimed by homesteaders in 1868. Its name was given to Pohocco Precinct, organized in about 1869, although the bluff did not actually lie within the precinct.

== Preservation ==
Although the top of the bluff was cultivated, the site otherwise underwent very little development. The wooded portion of the bluff was purchased in 1962 by Dr. Louis and Geraldine Gilbert. Learning of its significance to the Pawnee, they applied to have the site listed in the National Register of Historic Places. The application was approved in 1973. By then, it was the only one of the five nahurac sites that had not been destroyed or significantly damaged.

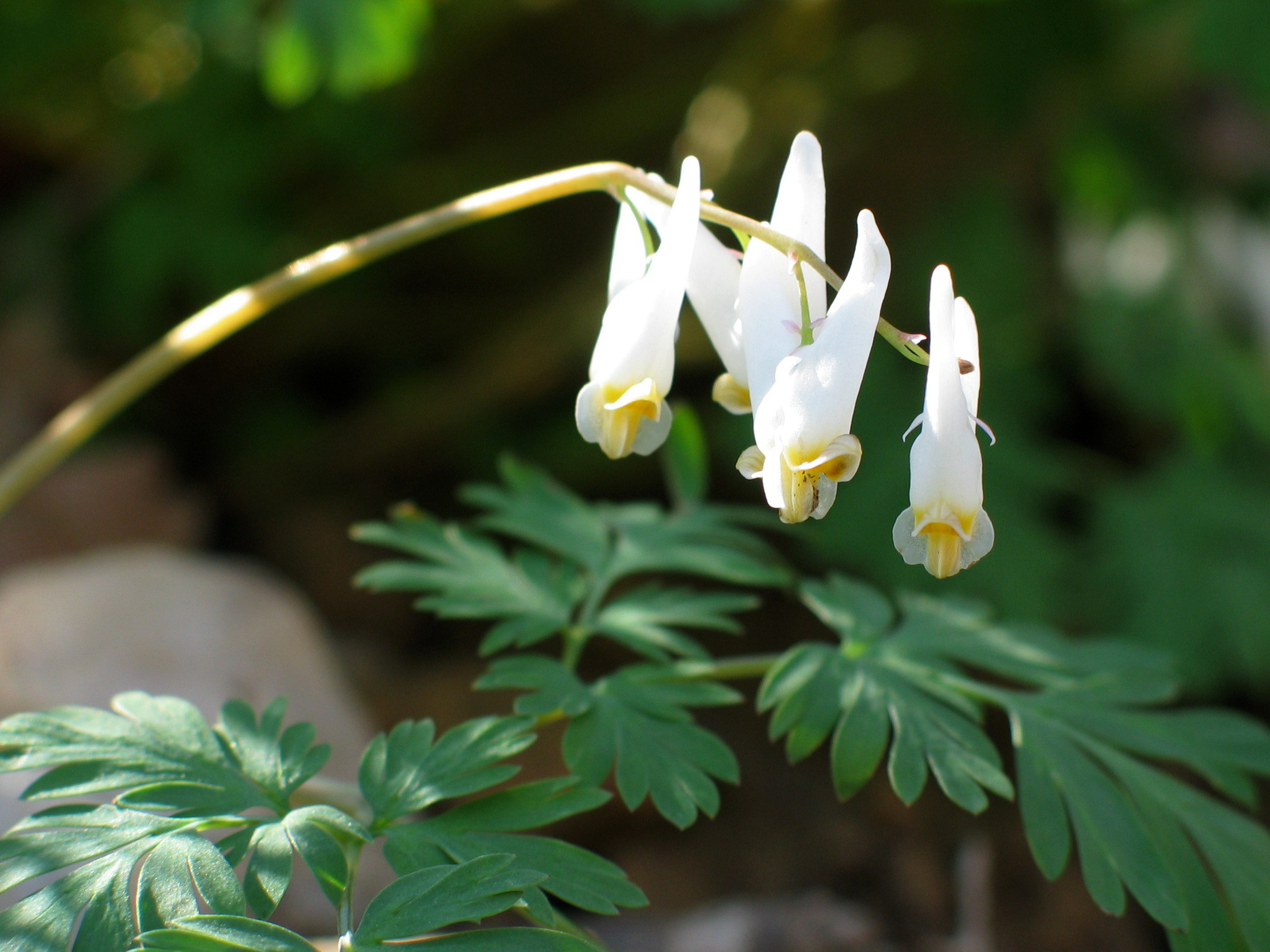
Dutchman's breeches

In the 1980s, the Gilberts placed a conservation easement on their property. The existence of the easement and Pahuk's sanctity to the Pawnee were factors cited in the 2005 decision by the Nebraska Department of Roads not to reroute U.S. Highway 77 west of Fremont in the course of converting it into an expressway between Lincoln and Norfolk, Nebraska.

In 2008, Pat and Nancy Shanahan, who farmed the land atop the bluff, created a conservation easement to protect their 257 acres (104 ha) from development. Four representatives of the Pawnee tribe traveled from Oklahoma to Nebraska for the dedication ceremony.

Apart from its historic and religious significance, Pahuk is of interest to biologists, as lying near the westernmost point in the Platte Valley distribution of a number of eastern woodland plant species, including bitternut hickory, black walnut, American linden, and Dutchman's breeches.
