= Waconda Spring =

Spring in Kansas, U.S.

Coordinates: 39°29′54″N 98°22′44″W

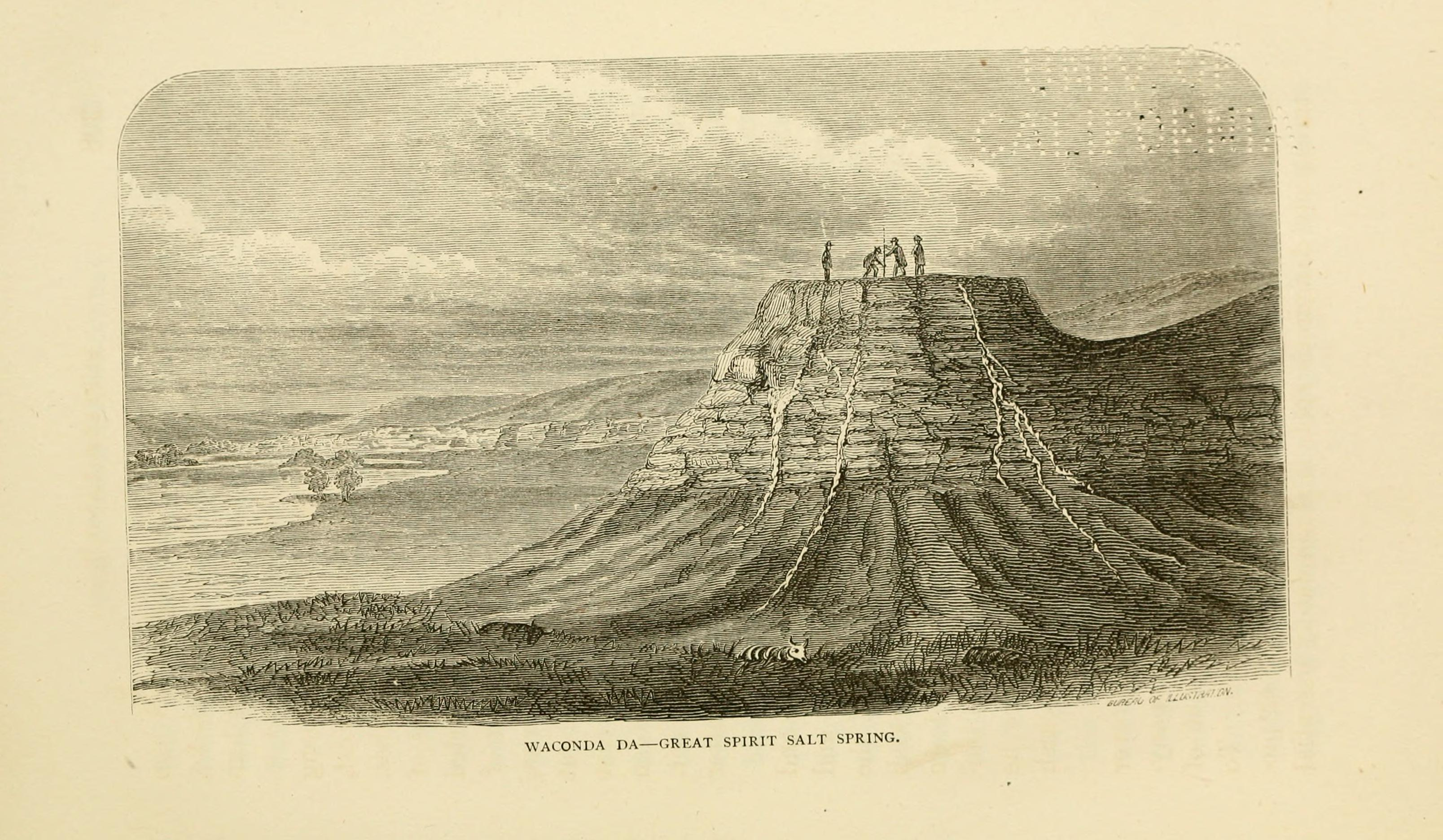
Drawing of Waconda Spring, 1873

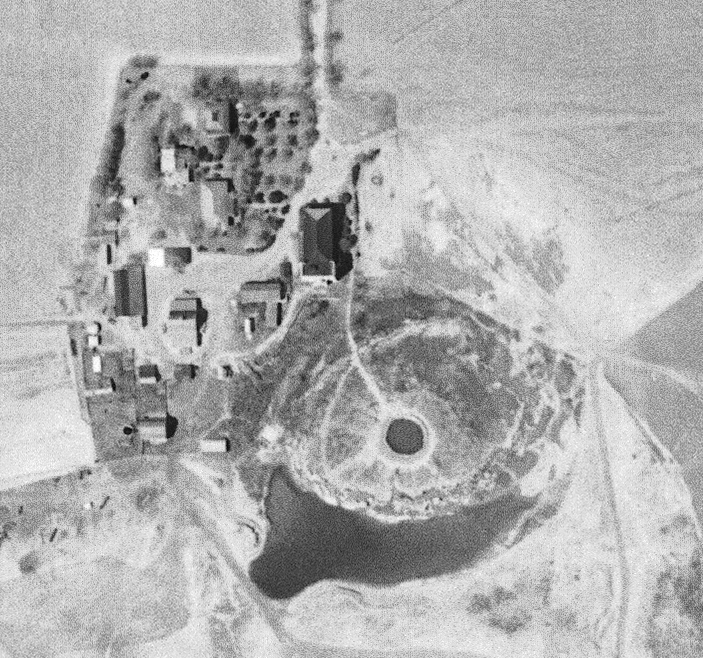
Aerial photo of Waconda spring, 1952.

Waconda Spring, or Great Spirit Spring, was a natural artesian spring located in Mitchell County, near the communities of Glen Elder and Cawker City in the U.S. state of Kansas. The sacred site for Native American tribes of the Great Plains was, for a time, the site of a health spa for American settlers. With the completion of the Glen Elder Dam in 1968, the mineral spring disappeared beneath the waters of Waconda Reservoir.

== Description ==
Waconda Spring was situated on the bank of the Solomon River, below the North and South Forks of the river. The water flowing from the spring had deposited a large cone of travertine around it. In 1866, surveyor David E. Ballard described it:

The Spring itself is a natural curiousity [sic], it being located on the summit of a cone shaped limestone rock. The rock is circular, about 200 feet in diameter at the base and about 30 feet high, upon the summit of this, rests the spring, the basin being circular and about 30 feet in diameter, its outlet is a trough apparently formed by the action of the water upon the rock. The water in the spring is about 20 feet deep and exceedingly strong with salt ...

== Native American beliefs ==
The name "Waconda" is from the Kanza language, and translates as "spirit water" or "Great Spirit Spring". It is located in territory controlled by the Pawnee, who knew it by the names "Pahowa" and "Kitzawitzuk", the latter translated as "water on a bank".

In the Pawnee traditional religion, the supreme being Tirawa allots supernatural powers to certain animals. These animals, the nahurac, act as Tirawa's servants and messengers, and intercede for the Pawnee with Tirawa.

The nahurac had five lodges, of which Waconda Spring was one. The foremost among them was Pahuk, usually translated "hill island", a bluff on the south side of the Platte River, near the town of Cedar Bluffs in present-day Saunders County, Nebraska. Lalawakohtito, or "dark island", was an island in the Platte near Central City, Nebraska; Ahkawitakol, or "white bank", was on the Loup River opposite the mouth of the Cedar River in what is now Nance County, Nebraska; and Pahur, or "hill that points the way", was a bluff south of the Republican River, near Guide Rock, Nebraska.

Beside the Pawnee, many other Native American tribes venerated Waconda Spring, often casting articles of value into it as offerings. George Bird Grinnell describes the offerings of the Pawnee as including blankets and robes, blue beads, eagle feathers, and moccasins.

A geoglyph, produced by the intaglio technique of removing the surface sod to form a figure, is located on a hillside about two miles southwest of Waconda Spring. The figure represents an unidentified animal, possibly a beaver. It is thought to be several hundred years old; soil analysis indicates that it was renewed at least once after its initial excavation, suggesting that it was in use over an extended period of time.

== History ==
It is said that the first European explorer to visit Waconda Spring was Sir William Johnson in 1767; however, this is unlikely. The first recorded visit to the site was by General Zebulon Pike in 1806. Pike visited the spring during his exploration of the Great Plains after he had concluded a treaty with the Pawnee.

Settlement in the area did not take place until after Kansas became a state in 1861. The first settler in the region was in 1870 by a man named Pfeiffer, who took out the first claim on the property. Kansas Senator Samuel C. Pomeroy toured the region in 1870 and marveled at what he saw. Said Pomeroy, "At first I declared it the Crater of an Ancient Volcano. The Water occupying its hollow center is fathomless, and about 200 feet in diameter in a perfect circle! It is always brimming full and running over on all sides ... The hills about it were as sacred to the Indians as those about Jerusalem." Pomeroy recognized the site's commercial potential and went on to predict that a health resort would soon be built in the region.

Within a few years, a man named Burnham constructed a bottling works on the site and began selling the mineral water as a health tonic. He called it Waconda Flier. The sales of Waconda Flier piqued the interest of an eastern investor named McWilliams, who in 1884 invested in the site and began the construction of a stone sanitarium. The spring was fenced off and completely privatized. The building was completed ten years later, and under the management of G. W. Cooper, Waconda Spring became a hotel and health spa. Sales of Waconda Flier continued, and by the 1890s it was being sold in all parts of the country. In 1904, Waconda Flier won a medal for its superior medicinal qualities at the St. Louis World's Fair.

In 1906, G. P. Abrahams purchased the property from McWilliams and continued operating the health spa and bottling plant until his 1924 death. In 1924, the property passed to Carl Bingesser, who had married Abrahams' daughter Anna in 1907. Under both Abrahams and Bingesser, the hotel resort was improved upon and maintained a solid reputation as health spa and place of healing. It continued to do so even as the spa passed on to Carlos Bingesser, the third generation of the Abrahams-Bingesser family to own and operate the spa. The facilities were fully modernized and offered physical therapy, hydro-therapy, electro-therapy, and dietary regimens. Water from Waconda Spring was used for internal and external cleansing of the body. It was piped into every bathtub in the sanitarium, was served with meals, and used for enemas. A popular slogan used to lure tourists to the resort was, "It will clean works until your works work." Waconda Spring was a popular, profitable enterprise for the Bingesser family. Descendants operated the spa until 1964.

== Glen Elder Dam ==
In 1944 the Bureau of Reclamation and the Army Corps of Engineers announced plans for a large earthen dam on the Solomon River near the town of Glen Elder. The plan called for the inundation of Waconda Spring. The Bingesser family fought to stop the plan, but in 1951 significant rainfall in Kansas led to massive flooding in Topeka and other Kansas towns. This led to renewed calls for dams and other flood control projects, including renewed calls for the Glen Elder Dam. A hydrologist was brought in to inspect Waconda Spring. The hydrologist concluded that Waconda Spring was unique and possibly the only spring like it in the world. Commercial advocates in favor of the dam dismissed the hydrologist and claimed that Waconda Spring was nothing more than a "mud hole."

Construction on Glen Elder Dam began in 1964 and was completed by the end of 1968. Engineers bulldozed the hotel and health spa then dumped the debris into the pool of Waconda Spring. Water from the Solomon River began filling up the valley, and by 1970 it was full.
