= Petalesharo (YTB-832) =

Tugboat of the United States Navy

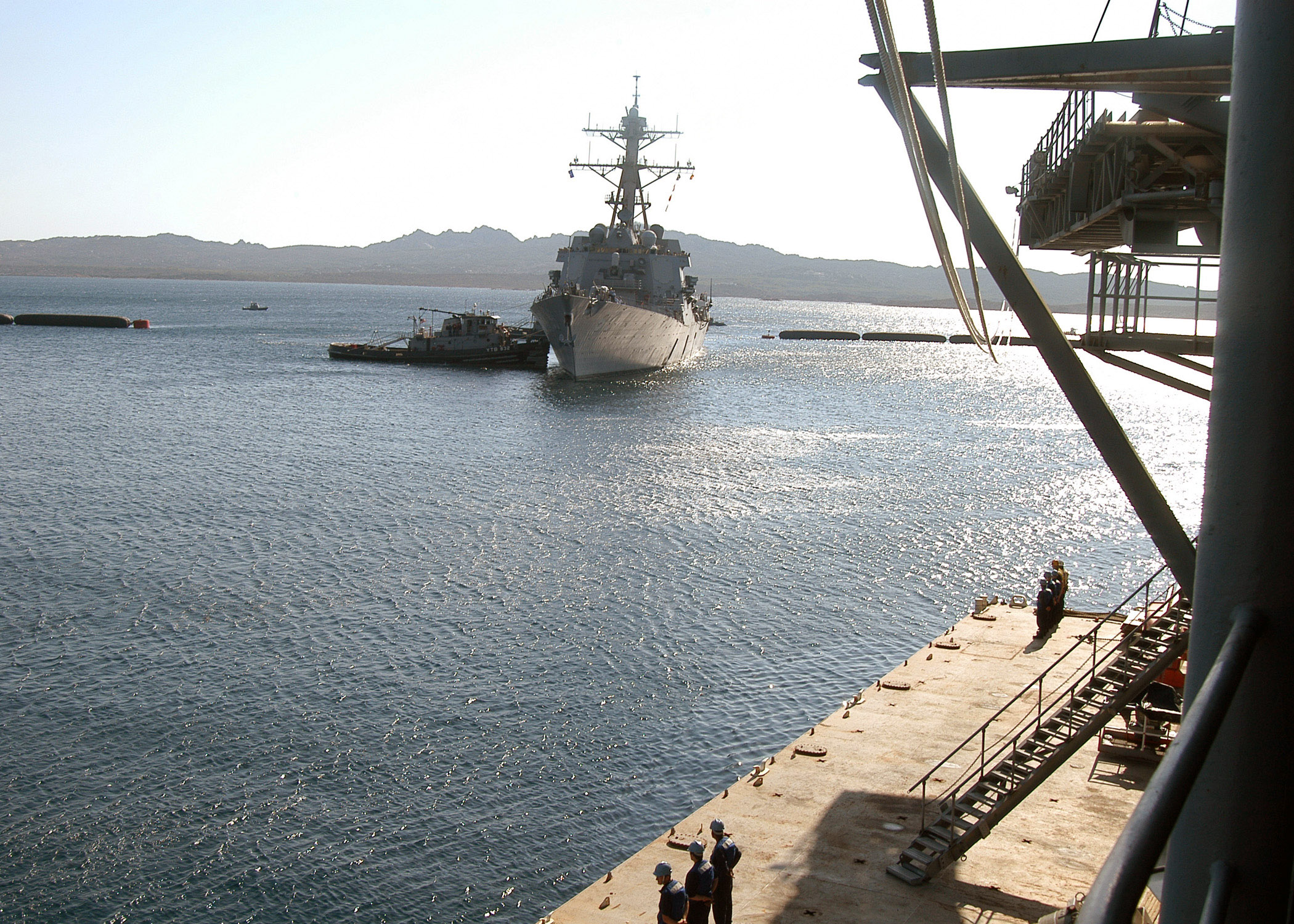
- Petalesharo (YTB-832) assists the guided-missile destroyer USS Roosevelt (DDG-80) into her berth alongside the forward-deployed destroyer tender USS Emory S. Land (AS-39) at La Maddalena, Italy

History

United States
- Awarded: 5 June 1973
- Builder: Marinette Marine, Marinette, Wisconsin
- Laid down: 26 December 1973
- Launched: 3 October 1974
- In service: 17 November 1974
- Stricken: 20 July 2007
- Fate: Sold to Hellenic Navy, 2008

General characteristics
- Class & type: Natick-class large harbor tug
- Displacement: 286 long tons (291 t) (light); 346 long tons (352 t) (full)
- Length: 108 ft (33 m)
- Beam: 31 ft (9.4 m)
- Draft: 14 ft (4.3 m)
- Speed: 12 knots (14 mph; 22 km/h)
- Complement: 12
- Armament: None

Petalesharo (YTB-832) is a United States Navy Natick-class large harbor tug. Petalesharo is named for Pawnee Chief Petalesharo.

== Construction ==
The contract for Petalesharo was awarded 5 June 1973. She was laid down on 26 December 1973 at Marinette, Wisconsin, by Marinette Marine and launched 3 October 1974.

== Operational history ==
Petalesharo was initially assigned to Naval Station Mayport, Florida. She was overhauled at the Naval Submarine Base Kings Bay Trident Refit Facility in Kings Bay, Georgia, in 1997 and then transferred to the Naval Support Activity, La Maddalena, Italy. Placed in inactive reserve at SUBRON22, July 1999. Stricken from the Navy List 20 July 2007, ex-Petalesharo was transferred to the Hellenic Navy 10 January 2008.
