= Skidi =

Band of Pawnee Native Americans

Skidi Pawnee
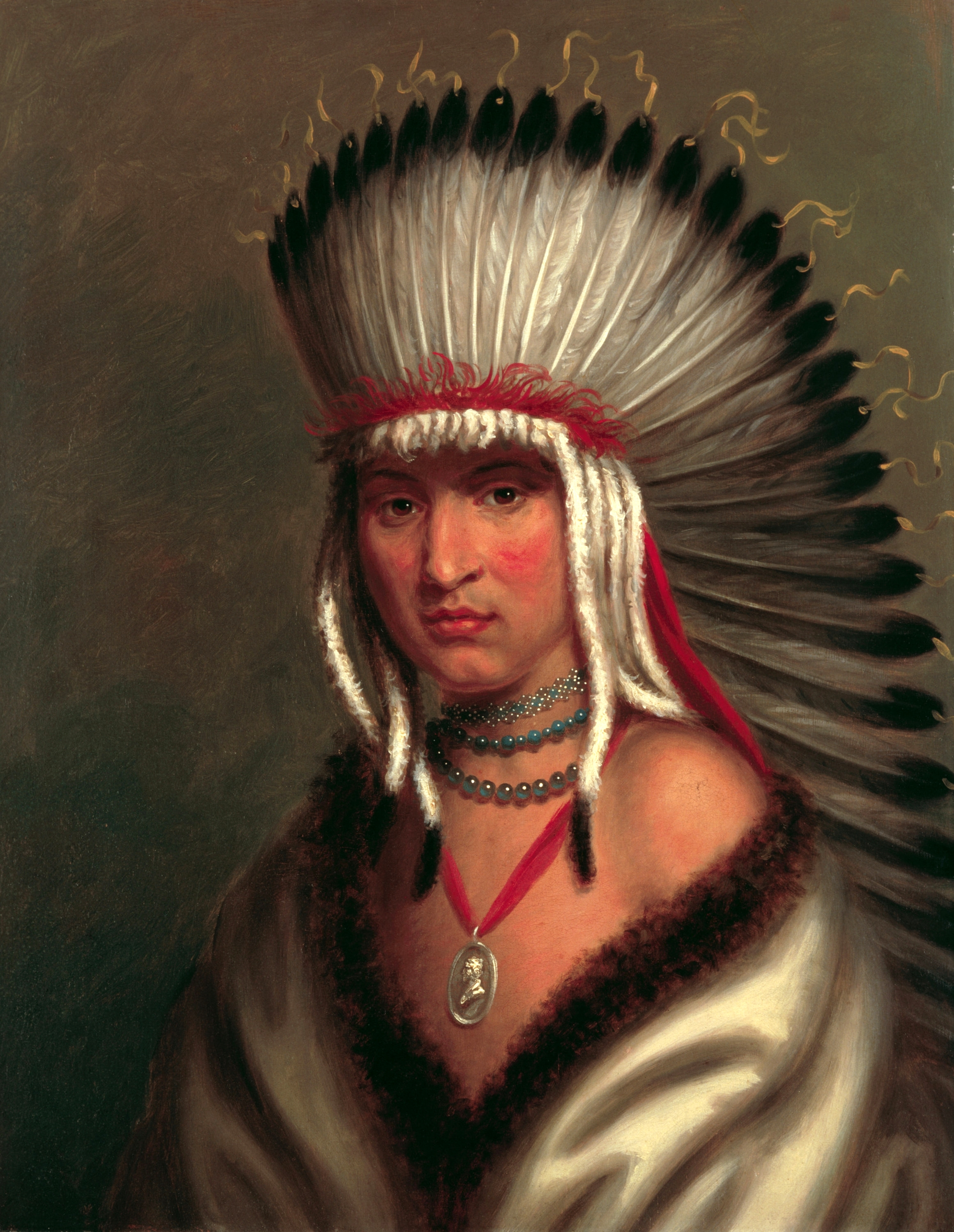
- Portrait of Petalesharro (ca. 1797–ca. 1832), a Skidi Pawnee, by Charles Bird King, 1822

Regions with significant populations
- Historically Kansas, Nebraska, and Texas, currently Oklahoma

Languages
- Skidi dialect of Pawnee language

Religion
- Indigenous religion

Related ethnic groups
- Other Pawnee people, Arikara people, Wichita people

The Skidi is one of four bands of Pawnee people, a central Plains tribe. They lived on the Central Plains of Nebraska and Kansas for most of the millennium prior to European contact. The Skidi, also known as the Wolf band, lived in the northern part of Pawnee territory.

According to oral history, the Skidi were associated with the Arikara and the Wichita before the Arikara moved northward. They did not join the other, southern bands of Pawnee until the mid-18th century. The Skidi language was less related to the other Pawnee languages than the other three tribes' languages were related to each other. In the 18th century, the Skidi first lived on the Loup River in Nebraska.

Today, the Skidi Pawnee are enrolled in the Pawnee Nation of Oklahoma.

== Names ==
The Skidi have also been known as the Wolf Pawnee, French Loup Pawnee, Panismaha, or Panimaha, or Skiri.

== History ==
The Skidi's main settlements were along the Platte River. Some early European explorers referred to this waterway as the Panimaha River, since this was before some of the Skidi migrated south.

=== 18th century ===
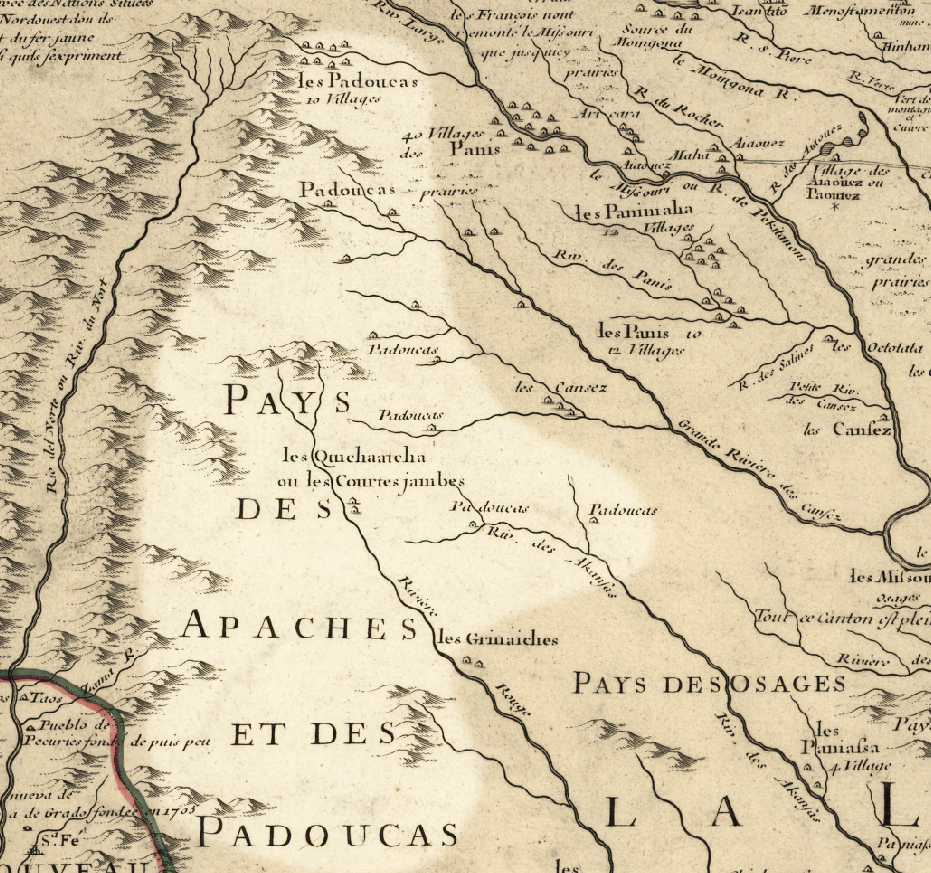
1718 French map reporting 12 villages of les Panimaha in the vicinity of Riv. des Panis (Platte River)

In the early 18th century, the Panishmaha lived west of the Missouri River in present-day Nebraska. A 1718 French map locates les Panimaha in the vicinity of the Riv. des Panis (Platte River) with other Pawnee villages (les Panis), perhaps on the Loup River, a historic territory of the Skidi. In the fall of 1724, in a village of the Kansa people, the Panismahas joined a peace council with Frenchmen, Otoes, Osages, Iowa, Missouri and Illini. In about 1752 they made peace with the Comanches (les Padoucas), Wichitas and the main Pawnee groups.

By the 1770s, the Panishmaha, a group of the Skidi had broken off and moved towards Texas, where they allied with the Taovayas, the Tonkawa, Yojuanes, and other Texas tribes. This group was referred to as the Panimaha. The Skidi are notable for their performance of a type of human sacrifice, known as the Morning Star ceremony, recorded for the last time in 1838.

=== 19th century ===
The Panishmaha, a group within the Skidi band, moved from what is now Nebraska to the Texas-Arkansas border regions where they lived with the Taovayas. It appears that this group was also the Pannis designated in a village along the Sulphur Creek in northeast Texas in a 19th-century Spanish map.

== Notable Skidi ==
- James Rolfe Murie (1862–1921), anthropologist, ethnographer

== See also ==
- Panis (slaves of First Nation descent)
