= Petalesharo =

19th century Pawnee leader

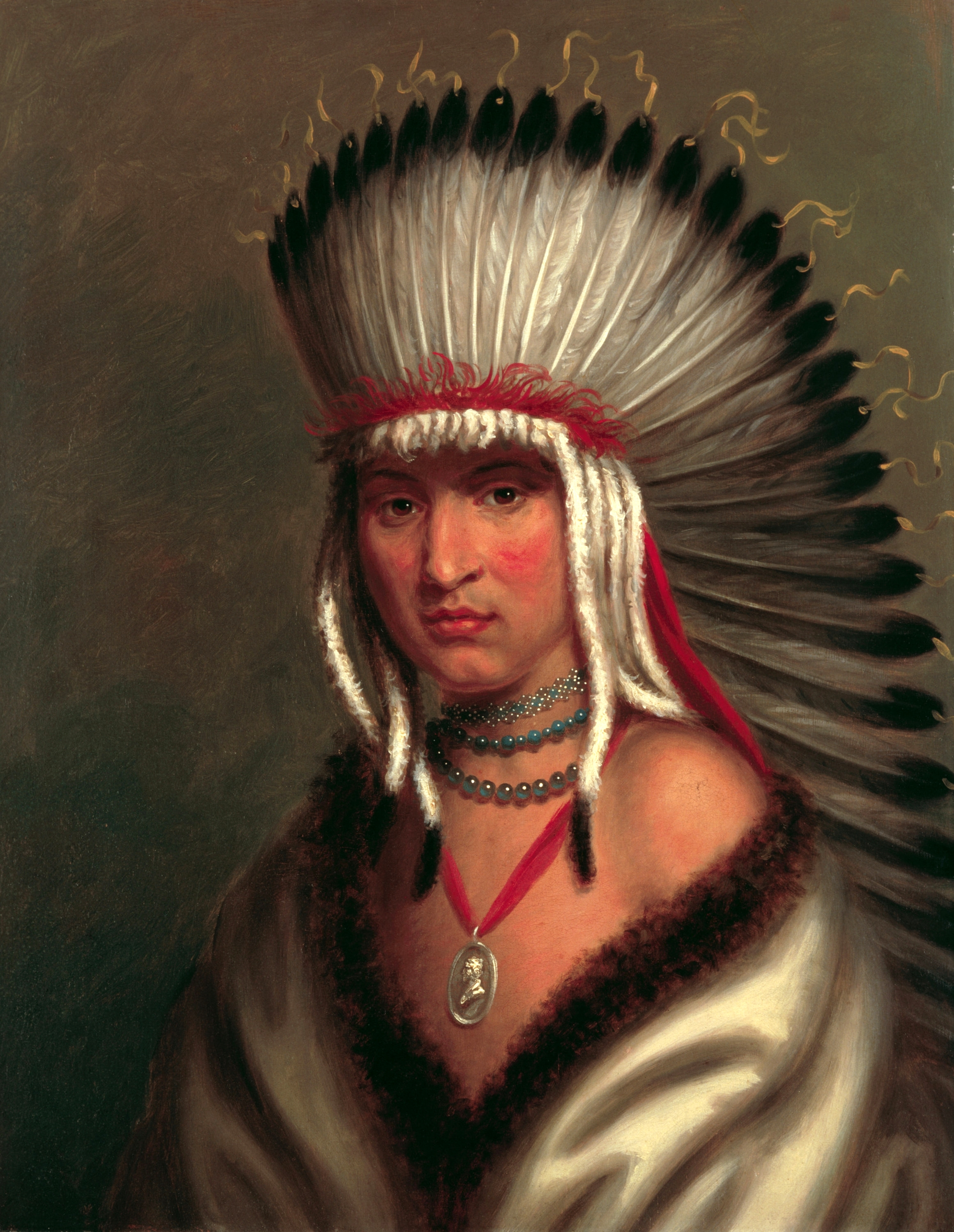
Petalesharro, a Pawnee Brave. 1822 painting by Charles Bird King. On display in the White House Library. His feather bonnet is likely the first ever painted by a white artist. To the cosmos focused Pawnees it symbolized a comet. He seems to wear a government medal on his breast.

Petalesharo (c. 1797 – c. 1836) was a Skidi Pawnee chief or brave who rescued an "Ietan" girl, that is Comanche girl, from a ritual human sacrifice around 1817 (in present-day Nebraska) and earned publicity for his act in national newspapers. In 1821, he was one of numerous Great Plains tribal chiefs to go to Washington, D.C. as part of the O'Fallon Delegation where they met President James Monroe.

== History ==
As was their traditional practice, the Skidi Pawnee had captured an enemy girl to sacrifice her as part of the spring equinox Morning Star ceremony. They would care for her well before the sacrifice in the weeks or months beforehand.

Petalesharo's father Knife Chief (Lachelasharo) opposed the ceremony, but the tribe ignored his concerns. The ritual had a long tradition and the people believed that their crops and hunting would suffer if the Morning Star did not receive a human sacrificial offering. The Comanche girl was tied to a pyre and prepared for execution when Petalesharo approached the warriors gathered for the ritual. Announcing that his father, also a chief, disapproved of the ceremony, he released the woman and led her away. Petalesharo gave the freed woman a horse and provisions, then sent her home to rejoin her tribe.

Missionaries working in the area heard the story of Petalesharo's bravery. Another version has two members of the 1820 Long Expedition, Edwin James and Robert R. Bell, as the carriers of the news. Thereby they corrected an 1818 newspaper story of a Comanche woman fleeing on a stolen horse and leaving her newborn child to be sacrificed instead. James gives the time for the deed of Petalesharo as 1817, while Bell states it took place "about five years since", ca. 1815. (Because no "Morning Star" was visible in the East in April 1817 and neither in April 1818, it has been suggested that the incident took place in 1816, when the planet Venus rose in the eastern morning sky.)

The Comanche girl was not the only person whom Petalesharo rescued from ritual sacrifice. In 1818, he prevented the sacrifice of a young boy under similar conditions. With the help of fur trader Alexander Papin, staying among the Pawnee, the Spanish boy came to live in the family of fur trader Manuel Lisa in St. Louis.

=== The news reach the major papers ===
The 1817 story circulated around the United States, appearing in newspapers that provided a romanticized version of the rescue. Petalesharo's story first appeared in The Washington Daily National Intelligencer on November 22, 1821. In the winter of 1821, the New York Commercial Advertiser published an eleven-stanza poem, "The Pawnee Brave." The poem became popular and was read and recited in parlors of sentimental New Yorkers.

=== Petalesharo in Washington City ===
Petalesharo was part of a delegation of Native American chiefs who traveled to Washington D.C. in 1821 on a trip organized by the superintendent of Indian affairs, Thomas L. McKenney, and Indian Agent Benjamin O'Fallon (it was sometimes called the O'Fallon Delegation). The U.S. officials intended to impress the Natives with the power and wealth of the white man and ideally persuade them to end their warfare against American settlers. Native Americans who participated in this delegation performed traditional dances, which drew a reported six to ten thousand on-lookers. Many businesses and Congress closed for the day to allow staff to attend the performances.

During the visit to Washington, news of Petalesharo's rescue became a popular topic of discussion. At Miss White's Select Female Seminary, the young students begged to attend the Native American dance performance. Afterward, they raised funds to have a medal created for Petalesharo, to commemorate his brave act. Made of silver, the medal had images depicting his rescue, together with the inscription, "bravest of the brave". McKenney accompanied Petalesharo to the home of one of the students' parents. There the young women presented the medal to him. Petalesharo made a short speech, saying, "I did not know the act was so good. It came from my heart. I was ignorant of its value. I now know how good it was. You make me know by giving me this medal."

The BIA commissioned Charles Bird King to paint portraits of Petalesharo and others in the delegation, including Young Omahaw, War Eagle, Little Missouri and Pawnees. Petalesharo was further painted by John Neagle, and he is also shown in the 1822 Samuel F.B. Morse painting, The Old House of Representatives, now held by the Corcoran Gallery of Art. During the trip, Petalesharo met author James Fenimore Cooper, who was believed to be inspired to write his novel, The Prairie.

=== Later ===
Indian agents had warned the Pawnees against continuing their sacrifices, seemingly starting with Superintendent William Clark in 1811. In 1827, some Pawnees, with the help of Indian agent John Dougherty, attempted to rescue a young Cheyenne girl who had been taken in a raid. During the effort, a Skidi Pawnee shot and killed the girl with arrows as she was being lifted onto a horse. This authentic event is the basis for a story of an assumed Morning Star rite and an actually never attempted rescue in 1833.

The last historic reference to Petalesharo is in 1825, when he and his father signed a treaty at Fort Atkinson, on the west bank of the Missouri River before his death in 1836 in a battle with "Cheyenne" near the Platte river in Nebraska.

The medal given by the student girls in Washington was excavated in 1883 from a gravesite in Howard County, Nebraska. A young farm boy, Olando Thompson, dug up the medal at the former site of a Skidi village. By the 1920s, the American Numismatic Society in New York had purchased the medal for its collection.

Earlier sources often confused Petalesharo, Skidi Brave, with two other 19th-century Pawnee with the same name. The second Petalesharo who also accompanied the 1821 delegation to Washington was mistaken for the name Peskelechaco, a Kitkehahki Chief. The third Petalesharo is, in fact, the second notable Petalesharo in Pawnee Treaties...his accurate title is Petalesharo II, the head chief of the Grand Pawnees in the 1860s.

Petalesharo is honored by the United States Navy. The large harbor tug, Petalesharo (YTB-832), was named after him.

== In popular culture ==
Petalesharo's story is narrated in Złoto Gór Czarnych (Gold of the Black Hills), a trilogy of novels told from the perspective of the Santee Dakota tribe, by Polish author Alfred Szklarski and his wife Krystyna Szklarska.
