= Bear Dance =

Ute ceremonial dance

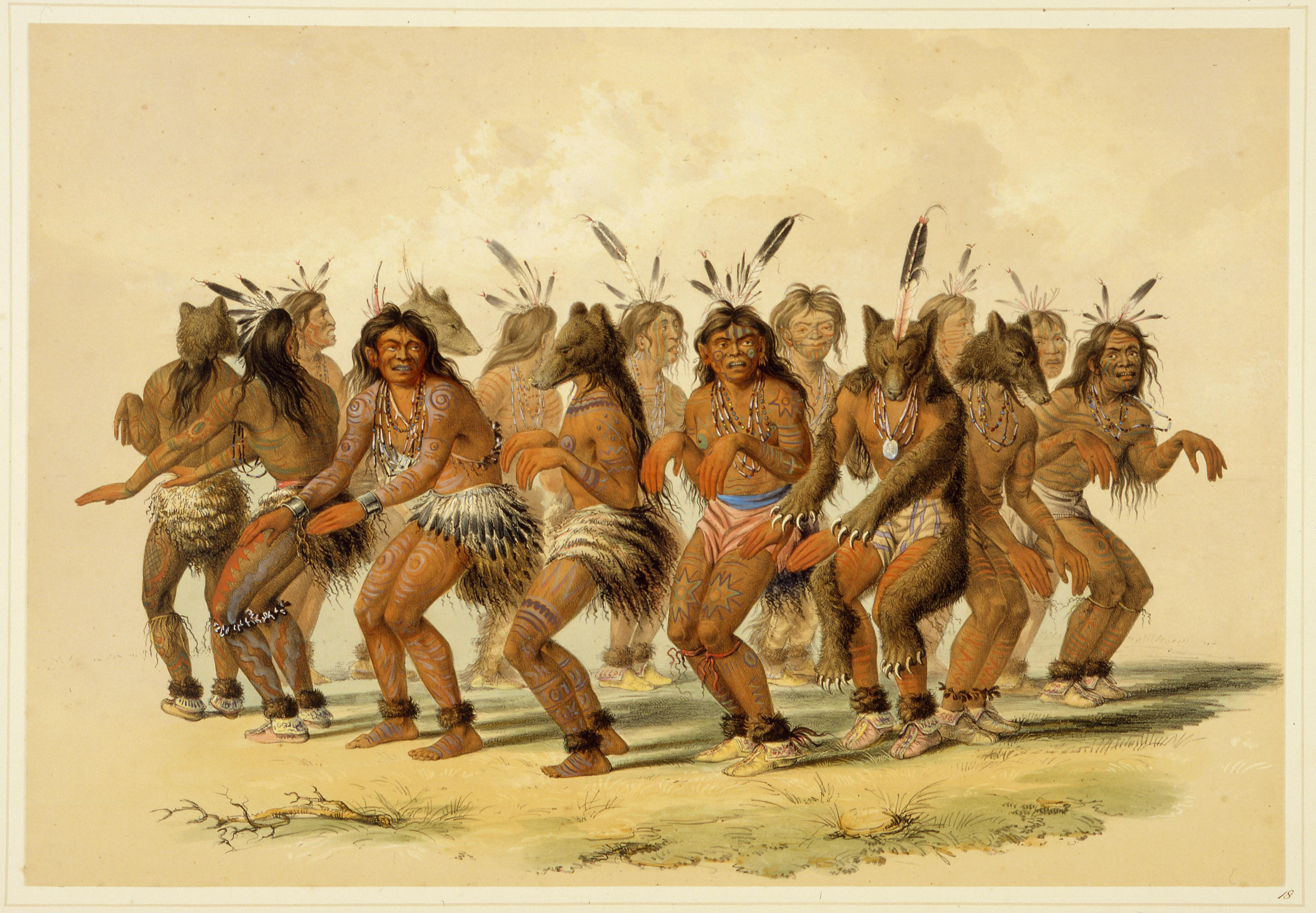
George Catlin, Bear Dance, hand-colored lithograph, 1844, Buffalo Bill Center of the West.

Bear Dance is a Ute ceremonial dance that occurs in the spring. It is a three-day event to strengthen social ties within the community, and encourage courtship. The event includes dancing, feasting, games, horse racing, and gambling.

It is one of the oldest Ute ceremonies. The Bear Dance was first recorded by Spanish conquistadors in the 15th century, but oral tradition dates it to be a thousand years old or older. and continues to be performed by modern Ute.

The bear symbolizes leadership, strength, and wisdom. Traditionally, a group of men play musical rasps for the dance.

== Origins ==
According to Ute tradition, the Bear Dance was first taught to a young hunter by a she-bear. The primal ancestor of the Ute Indians are believed by themselves to be bears. The dance celebrates both the waking of hibernating bears and in winter, and the time when, historically, Ute people were able to break winter camps and look for food and game.

Along with waking up for winter finding a new mate for the new season is another reason this dance is performed by bears, and humans.

== Description ==
The Bear Dance lasts a week to ten days, beginning after the first thunder of the spring, which usually occurs in March. Ute people of all ages are involved in this yearly dance, although some traditions say women who are menstruating or pregnant should not attend. Both men and women prepared for the bear dance. Traditionally, women prepare the clothes to be worn during the dance, while the corral and other things related to the dance are made by men. Each year, a new corral is made and is placed at the entrance of the dance, with its entrance facing east.

The Bear Dance is traditionally directed by a medicine man or chief. The basic dance step, called mamakwanika in Ute (English: back-and-forth dance), involves a back-and-forth motion, meant to emulate bears scratching a tree. During the dance, women are the ones who choose their male dance partner. Partners dance across from each other, without touching, for the first two days, and are allowed to touch while dancing for the last two days. The dance leader, known as the "Cat Man", touches couples with a willow stick to note when they are allowed to touch. Two different traditions exist regarding a dancer falling: one says that a fallen dancer marks the end of the dance; another says if dancers fall, they should remain on the ground until an elder blesses them.

According to tradition, the songs played by the Ute show respect to the bears spirits. Instruments used include wooden notched sticks, musical rasps, and drums. The songs are meant to sound like bears scratching and growling. When the drums are played, they sing an incantation. They believe the incantation takes the noises to the caves of the bears which are then transformed into thunder.

Following the ceremony, recreational dancing, socializing, and feasting occur. At the end of the event, dancers can leave feathers or fringe from their outfits by the entrance of the corral, symbolizing the leaving of worries, pain, or bad luck in the past.

== Modern status ==
The Bear Dance continues to be performed by the Ute People in the 21st century, primarily in Colorado and Utah and often in a shorter four day format. Some Ute now hold the dance around Memorial Day weekend, in May, so as to align with the schedules of schoolchildren and workers. Others push the dance further back into the summer, leading to what some dub a "Bear Dance season" that stretches from April into September. The event is generally open to the public. During the COVID-19 pandemic, the 2020 Bear Dance was cancelled, with Utes using social media to share photos and videos of previous Bear Dances. Some musicians performed Bear Dance chants in "otherwise empty arenas", so people could come hear the songs even if dancing did not occur. In 2021, some groups put on a "pared down" Bear Dance, with COVID-19 screenings, encouraging of face masks, and vaccine distribution.

Ute children often learn about the dance and its etiquette at school.

Some modern adaptations include the use of technology both to promote the event and during the event, such as the use of loudspeakers. The master of ceremonies is nearly always a male singer, who banters with the audiences in between songs, speaking both on traditional beliefs and modern life, often humorously.

Some Christian Ute have interpreted the dance as being given to the Ute people by Jesus Christ.
