= Guide Rock (hill) =

Hill in southern Nebraska, U.S.

- Pa-hur
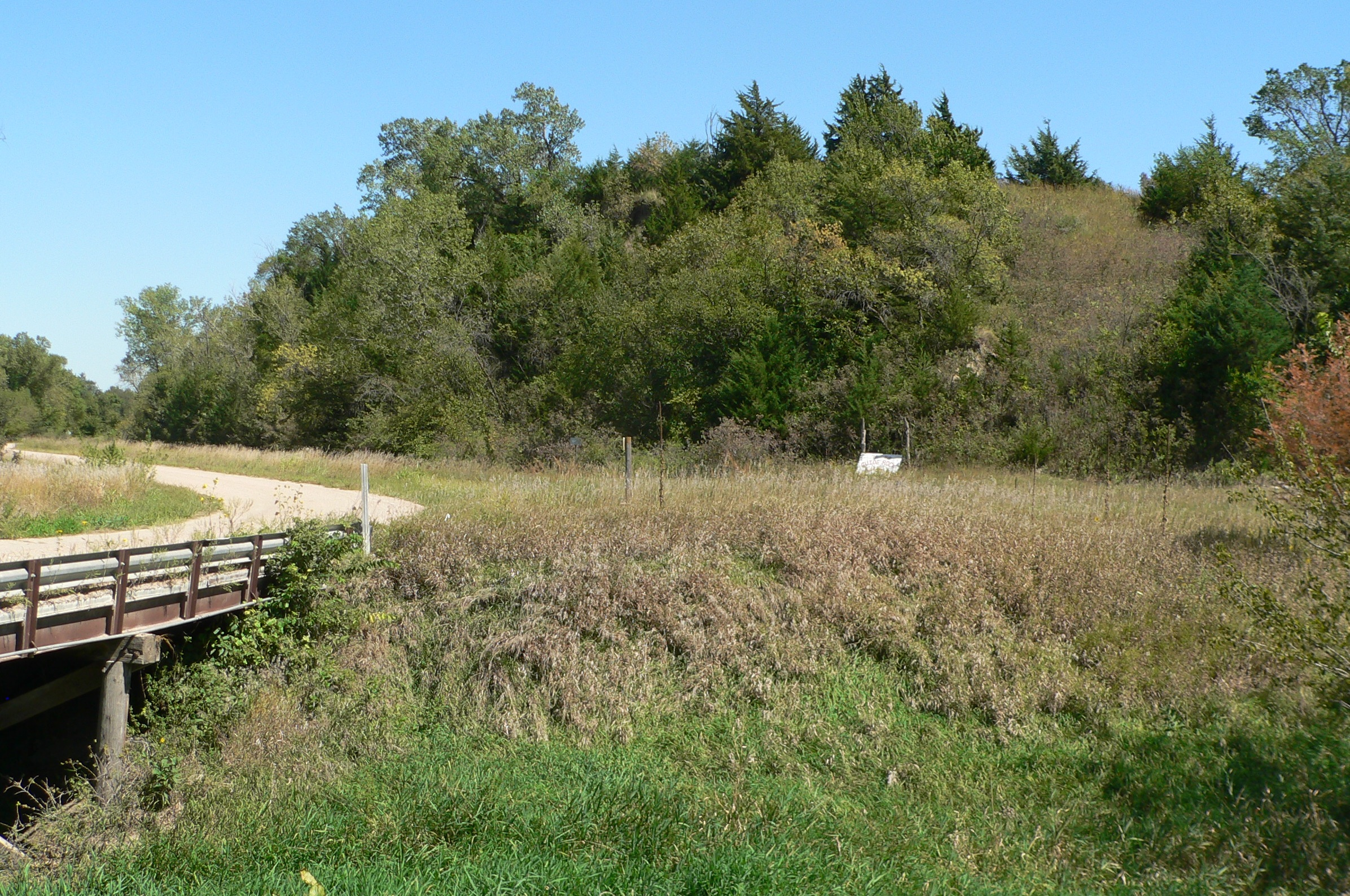
- Guide Rock, seen from the west. The bridge in the left foreground crosses Rankin Creek.

Highest point
- Elevation: 1,713 ft (522 m)
- Coordinates: 40°3′6″N 98°19′6″W

Geography
- Location within Nebraska Location within the United States
- Location: Webster County, Nebraska, United States

Guide Rock, whose Pawnee name is Pa-hur or Pahur, is a hill in south central Nebraska in the United States. In the traditional Pawnee religion, it was one of five dwelling places of spirit animals with miraculous powers.

In 1806, separate expeditions led by Facundo Melgares and Zebulon Pike both journeyed to a large Pawnee village nearby; Pike persuaded the inhabitants to lower the recently received flag of Spain and replace it with that of the United States.

The hill's English name was given to the nearby village of Guide Rock, Nebraska.

== Description ==
Guide Rock is located in Webster County, Nebraska. It lies southeast of the town that bears its name, on the south side of the Republican River and just east of Rankin Creek.

Descriptions of the landform vary. The United States Geological Survey classifies it as a "pillar", which it defines as a "[v]ertical, standing, often spire-shaped, natural rock formation". A local writer described it as a "vast rocky bluff". However, the authors of Roadside Geology of Nebraska state that it is "not so much a rock as a loess bluff of modest size". The difference might be due to human action: in 1973, it was reported that of the five sacred places of the Pawnee, four, including this one, had been "extensively damaged or totally destroyed".

== Pawnee traditional belief ==
In the Pawnee traditional religion, the supreme being Tirawa allots supernatural powers to certain animals. These animals, the nahurac, act as Tirawa's servants and messengers, and intercede for the Pawnee with Tirawa.

The nahurac had five lodges. The foremost among them was Pahuk, usually translated "hill island", a bluff on the south side of the Platte River, near the town of Cedar Bluffs in present-day Saunders County, Nebraska. Lalawakohtito, or "dark island", was an island in the Platte near Central City, Nebraska; Ahkawitakol, or "white bank", was on the Loup River opposite the mouth of the Cedar River in what is now Nance County, Nebraska. Kitzawitzuk, translated "water on a bank", also known to the Pawnee as Pahowa, was a spring on the Solomon River near Glen Elder, Kansas; it is usually known today by its Kanza-derived name of Waconda Spring. It now lies beneath the waters of Waconda Reservoir.

The fifth lodge of the nahurac was known to the Pawnee as Pahur, a name translated as "hill that points the way". According to George Bird Grinnell, the accent is on the second syllable; the "a" in the first syllable is pronounced like the "a" in "father"; and the "u" in the second syllable is pronounced long, like the vowel in "pool". In English, the name was shortened to "Guide Rock".

== History ==
=== Pawnee village ===
The Pawnee tended to locate major population centers near homes of the nahurac. Pahur was no exception: a large village of the Kitkehahki, or Republican Pawnee, was situated a short distance upstream from the hill. The village was intermittently occupied from about 1770 to 1830.

After the Louisiana Purchase, the United States found itself embroiled in a conflict with Spain, which disputed the boundaries of the Louisiana Territory, contending that most of the territory west of the Mississippi River belonged to them. The Spanish dispatched four expeditions from Santa Fe to find and arrest the Lewis and Clark Expedition. The fourth of these, in 1806, consisted of over 600 men under Lieutenant Facundo Melgares; its size was intended to impress the Native Americans of the area and to secure their cooperation with Spain against the United States.

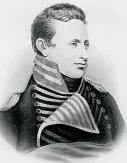
Zebulon Pike

The United States also sent out an expedition in 1806. General James Wilkinson, the newly appointed governor of the Louisiana Territory, dispatched Zebulon Pike and 23 men to explore the headwaters of the Arkansas and Red Rivers, to negotiate peace between the Native American tribes of the area, and to contact the Comanche of the High Plains.

Melgares and 360 of his men arrived at the Guide Rock Pawnee village. They gave presents and a Spanish flag to the inhabitants, and requested that they block travel west and southwest into Spanish-claimed territory by anyone from the United States. Rather than continuing toward the Missouri, they then returned to the Arkansas River, where they rejoined the rest of their party; from there, they returned to Santa Fe. The failure of their expedition has been attributed to Pawnee opposition, combined with the difficulty of maintaining a force of that size on the country with no supply lines.

The Pike party arrived at the Guide Rock village on September 25, 1806, a few weeks after Melgares's departure, and remained there for nearly two weeks. While there, Pike persuaded the Pawnee to haul down the Spanish flag that they had been given by Melgares, and to replace it with an American flag. However, he left the Spanish flag in the possession of the Pawnee, only asking that they not fly it while his party was in the village.

When Pike prepared to depart, the Pawnee informed him that they would oppose his attempt to continue westward. Melgares had requested that they prevent such travel; furthermore, they did not want the United States to establish relations with their Comanche enemies. Pike refused to be intimidated, making it clear that if fighting ensued, his party would kill a great many Pawnee before their own extermination. In the end, the Pawnee relented, and Pike's expedition was allowed to proceed.

=== Guide Rock, Nebraska ===
The first settlement established by homesteaders in Webster County was established on the north side of the Republican River. By a unanimous vote of eight settlers, it was named Guide Rock after the nearby hill.

An annual festival held in Guide Rock is called "Pa-Hur Days".
