= Guide Rock, Nebraska =

- Village
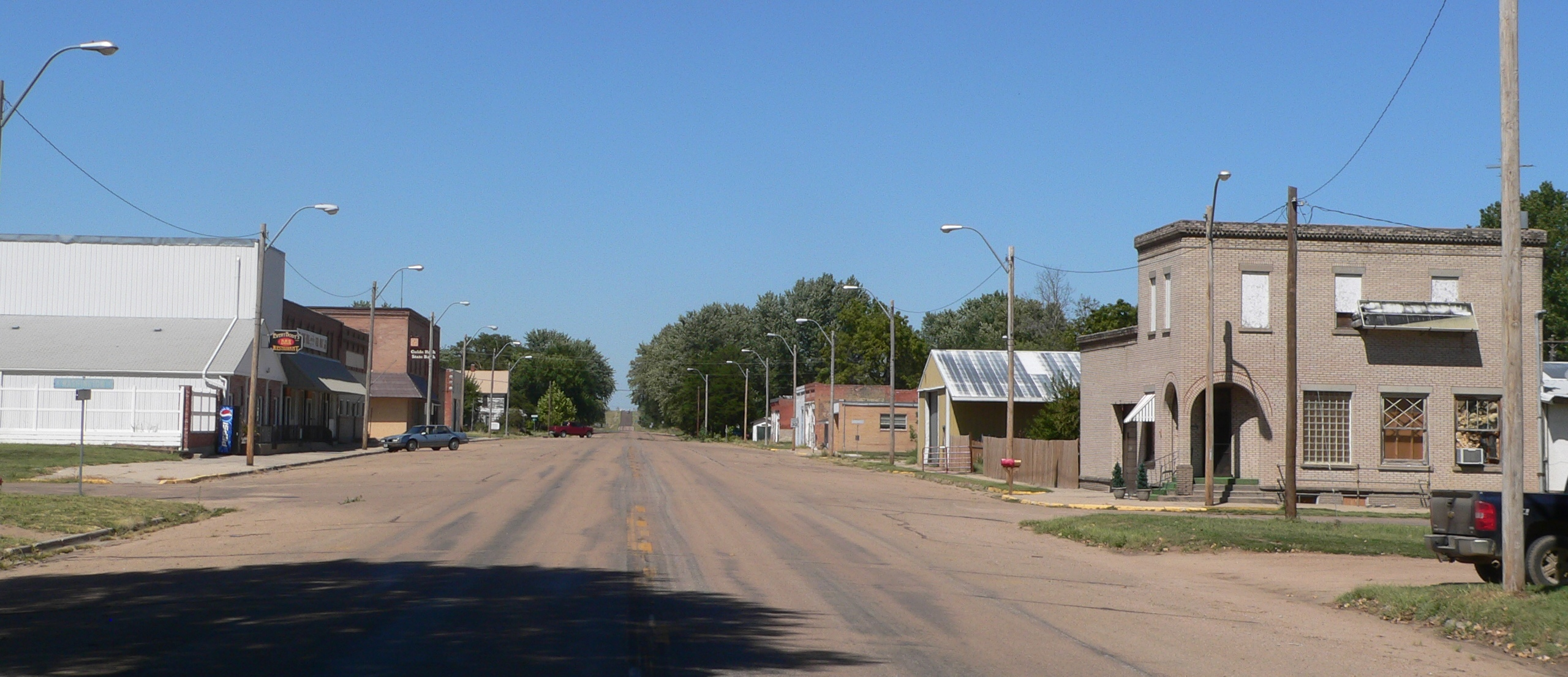
- Downtown Guide Rock: looking north along University Street (Nebraska Highway 78), September 2010

- Location of Guide Rock, Nebraska
- Coordinates: 40°04′25″N 98°19′44″W
- Country: United States
- State: Nebraska
- County: Webster

Area
  - Total: 0.50 sq mi (1.30 km^{2})
  - Land: 0.50 sq mi (1.30 km^{2})
  - Water: 0 sq mi (0.00 km^{2})
- Elevation: 1,657 ft (505 m)

Population (2020)
  - Total: 199
  - Density: 396.6/sq mi (153.13/km^{2})
- Time zone: UTC-6 (Central (CST))
  - Summer (DST): UTC-5 (CDT)
- ZIP code: 68942
- Area code: 402
- FIPS code: 31-20365
- GNIS feature ID: 2398215

Guide Rock is a village in Webster County, Nebraska, United States. As of the 2020 census, Guide Rock had a population of 199.

== History ==
The first settlement at Guide Rock was made in 1870. Guide Rock was platted in 1873. The town was named after Guide Rock, a hill on the opposite bank of the Republican River.

A historical marker near the village marks the former site of a large Pawnee village.

== Geography ==
According to the United States Census Bureau, the village has a total area of 0.50 square miles (1.29 km^{2}), all land.

== Demographics ==
Historical population
Census	Pop.	Note	%±
1890	336		—
1900	416		23.8%
1910	690		65.9%
1920	611		−11.4%
1930	690		12.9%
1940	596		−13.6%
1950	676		13.4%
1960	441		−34.8%
1970	318		−27.9%
1980	344		8.2%
1990	290		−15.7%
2000	245		−15.5%
2010	225		−8.2%
2020	199		−11.6%
U.S. Decennial Census

=== 2010 census ===
As of the census of 2010, there were 225 people, 109 households, and 64 families residing in the village. The population density was 450.0 inhabitants per square mile (173.7/km^{2}). There were 150 housing units at an average density of 300.0 per square mile (115.8/km^{2}). The racial makeup of the village was 96.0% White, 1.3% Native American, and 2.7% from two or more races. Hispanic or Latino of any race were 4.9% of the population.

There were 109 households, of which 22.0% had children under the age of 18 living with them, 45.9% were married couples living together, 8.3% had a female householder with no husband present, 4.6% had a male householder with no wife present, and 41.3% were non-families. 37.6% of all households were made up of individuals, and 17.4% had someone living alone who was 65 years of age or older. The average household size was 2.06 and the average family size was 2.67.

The median age in the village was 50.5 years. 19.1% of residents were under the age of 18; 5.4% were between the ages of 18 and 24; 18.6% were from 25 to 44; 32% were from 45 to 64; and 24.9% were 65 years of age or older. The gender makeup of the village was 52.4% male and 47.6% female.

=== 2000 census ===
As of the census of 2000, there were 245 people, 133 households, and 69 families residing in the village. The population density was 485.7 inhabitants per square mile (187.5/km^{2}). There were 162 housing units at an average density of 321.2 per square mile (124.0/km^{2}). The racial makeup of the village was 98.78% White, and 1.22% from two or more races.

There were 133 households, out of which 15.0% had children under the age of 18 living with them, 42.1% were married couples living together, 8.3% had a female householder with no husband present, and 47.4% were non-families. 43.6% of all households were made up of individuals, and 18.0% had someone living alone who was 65 years of age or older. The average household size was 1.84 and the average family size was 2.51.

In the village, the population was spread out, with 15.1% under the age of 18, 7.3% from 18 to 24, 24.9% from 25 to 44, 26.5% from 45 to 64, and 26.1% who were 65 years of age or older. The median age was 47 years. For every 100 females, there were 97.6 males. For every 100 females age 18 and over, there were 98.1 males.

As of 2000 the median income for a household in the village was $20,250, and the median income for a family was $26,500. Males had a median income of $22,250 versus $18,750 for females. The per capita income for the village was $18,981. About 13.2% of families and 17.8% of the population were below the poverty line, including 17.0% of those under the age of eighteen and 3.8% of those 65 or over.

== See also ==
- List of municipalities in Nebraska
