= Pawnee language =

Endangered Caddoan language of Oklahoma, US

Pawnee
- pâri pakûruʼ
- Native to: United States
- Region: North-central Oklahoma
- Ethnicity: 2,500 Pawnee (2007)
- Native speakers: <10 (2007)
- Language family: Caddoan: Northern; Pawnee–Kitsai; Pawnee–Arikara; Pawnee
- Dialects: Skiri †; South Band

Language codes
- ISO 639-3: paw
- Glottolog: pawn1254
- ELP: Pawnee
- Linguasphere: 64-BAB-b
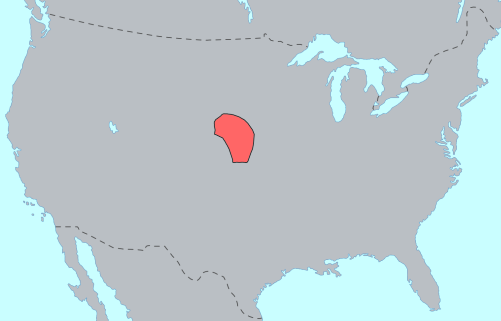
- Pre-contact distribution of Pawnee

- Pawnee is classified as Critically Endangered by the UNESCO Atlas of the World's Languages in Danger.

The Pawnee language, pâri pakûruʼ, is a Caddoan language traditionally spoken by Pawnee Native Americans, currently inhabiting north-central Oklahoma. Historically, the Pawnee lived along the Platte River in what is now Nebraska.

== Dialects ==
Two important dialect divisions are evident in Pawnee: South Band and Skiri. The distinction between the two dialects rests on differences in their respective phonetic inventory and lexicon. The Skiri dialect became extinct in 2001 with the death of Lula Nora Pratt.

== Status ==
As of 2007, there are fewer than 10 native speakers, all elderly. The Pawnee Nation is developing teaching materials for the local high school and for adult language classes. There are also extensive documentary materials in the language archived at the American Indian Studies Research Institute. The Pawnee language can be heard spoken in the 1990 movie Dances With Wolves and the 2015 movie The Revenant. In 2019 and 2020, the Pawnee Nation posted online videos teaching the Pawnee language.

== Phonology ==
The following describes the South Band dialect.

=== Consonants ===
Pawnee has eight consonant phonemes, and according to one analysis of medial- and final-position glottal stops, one may posit a ninth consonant phoneme.

	Bilabial	Alveolar	Velar	Glottal
Stop	p	t	k	(ʔ)
Affricate		ts		
Rhotic		r		
Fricative		s		h
Approximant			w	

- /ʔ/ is predictable when it occurs in the middle of words. However, since /ʔ/ is not completely predictable at the end of words, it may also need to be considered a phoneme.

=== Vowels ===
Pawnee has four short and four long vowel phonemes.

	Front	Back
High	i iː	u uː
Mid-low	e eː	a aː

=== Phonotactics ===
Consonant clusters are common in Pawnee in initial, medial, and final positions. These clusters fall into a small number of types, illustrated in the table below. The sequence /ks/ patterns as a single unit in initial and medial clusters, and so it is not considered a cluster in itself.

	C1	C2	Examples
Initial	/ts, ks/	/p, t, k/	cpirârus "to fly" kspata "flesher"
Medial	/t, k, ks, s/	/p, t, k/	pitkus "two" istu "again"
Medial	/h/	any consonant except /s, h/	rahwa "captive"
Final	/h/	/t, k, ts, r/	wahc "to be open" ahr "to live, exist"

Vowel sequences are allowed morpheme-internally and across morpheme boundaries. Pawnee distinguishes between long vowels, doubled vowels (e.g. kskîtiiks "four"), long + short vowel sequences (cakîis "trotter"), and short-long vowel sequences (tiîtit "snipe"). No morpheme contains two long vowels in sequence, however.

== Morphology ==
Pawnee is an ergative-absolutive polysynthetic language.

== Alphabet ==
The Pawnee alphabet has nine consonants and eight vowels. The letters are relatively similar in pronunciation to their English counterparts.

=== Consonants ===
Spelling	Sound (IPA)	English equivalents
p	p	poke, cup
t	t	top, cat
k	k	cool, stuck
c	ʃ ~ ts	shell, push ~ pants
s	s	silly, face
h	h	heart, ahead
r	r	car, ferry
w	w	wacky, away
ʼ	ʔ	The "-" in uh-oh

=== Vowels ===
Spelling	Sound (IPA)	English approximation
i	i	sit
ii	iː	feed
e	e	red
ee	eː	paid
a	a	nut
aa	aː	father
u	u	book
uu	uː	rude

=== Other alphabets ===
Here are other alphabets that are used sometimes in Pawnee texts.

Pawnee Alphabet #1
a	â	c	č	e	ê	h	i	î	k	p	r	s	t	u	û	w	ʼ

Pawnee Alphabet #2
a	aa	ch	e	ee	h	i	ii	k	o	oo	p	r	s	t	ts	u	uu	w	ʼ
