= Republican River Expedition =

US Military Expedition

- Part of the American Indian Wars
Date	June – July 1869
Location	Republican River Valley (Kansas, Nebraska, Colorado)
Result	U.S. victory; Cheyenne Dog Soldiers expelled

Belligerents
United States Pawnee	Cheyenne

Commanders and leaders
Eugene A. Carr	Tall Bull

The Republican River Expedition was a United States Army campaign from June to July 1869, aimed at expelling hostile Plains Indians, particularly the Cheyenne Dog Soldiers, from the Republican River Valley in Kansas, Nebraska, and Colorado and mapping the uncharted terrain it crossed on the way. Led by Brevet Major General Eugene A. Carr of the Fifth U.S. Cavalry, the expedition sought to safeguard American settlement in the valley following increased Indian raids in the post-Civil War period. It concluded with the Battle of Summit Springs on July 11, 1869, a decisive US Army victory that curtailed significant Indian resistance in the region.

== Background ==
American expansion into the central plains after the Homestead Acts and the end of the Civil War led to increased conflicts between settlers and the local Indian tribes. The Republican River Valley, a Cheyenne Dog Soldier stronghold under Chief Tall Bull, saw heightened tensions by 1869. Raids on Kansas settlements escalated, with a notable attack on May 30, 1869, near Fossil Creek, where Cheyenne warriors killed 13 settlers and abducted two women, Susanna Alderdice and Maria Weichell, near Salina. The kidnappings of Alderdice, a 29-year-old mother of four, and Weichell sparked outrage and demands for military action. On May 31, 1869, Nebraska Governor David Butler urged General Christopher C. Augur, commander of the Department of the Platte, to intervene, citing imminent threats reported by settlers and scouts. Augur, constrained by limited forces, initially supplied settlers with 50 Spencer carbines and 10,000 rounds, and promised a follow-up cavalry expedition to clear the Republican River valley of hostile Indians.

The Republican River Expedition unfolded within the broader operations of the Department of the Platte, a U.S. Army administrative division established in 1866 to secure the Central Plains amid the post-Civil War Indian Wars. The department oversaw campaigns against hostile tribes like the Cheyenne and Sioux, protecting settlements, trails, and railroad lines. The Pawnee, a tribe reduced to about 3,000 by 1869 due to disease and warfare, allied with the U.S. through treaties (e.g., in 1833 and 1857) in search of protection from their longstanding enemies the Cheyenne, who with their allies the Sioux raided Pawnee lands relentlessly. This enmity, coupled with the economic incentive of Army pay and rations, drove the Pawnee to join expeditions like Carr’s against the Cheyenne.

== Organization and Commanding Officers ==
The expedition’s structure reflected the frontier army’s resource constraints and reliance on allied scouts:

- Commanding Officer: Brevet Major General Eugene A. Carr, a veteran of the Civil War and Indian Wars, led the expedition.
- Subordinate Officers: Brevet Colonel William B. Royall, second-in-command; Major Eugene W. Crittenden; Captains Luther H. North and Robert Sweatman. Chief of Scouts William F. "Buffalo Bill" Cody provided critical reconnaissance, while Major Frank J. North commanded the Pawnee Battalion.
- Units: The force comprised eight to ten companies of the Fifth U.S. Cavalry and the Pawnee Battalion. Civilian teamsters supported logistics with a wagon train.

== The March ==
The expedition departed Fort McPherson on June 9, 1869 with a ceremonial send-off attended by General Christopher C. Augur and the garrison. On the first day, the column faced immediate hurdles: overloaded wagons bogged down in muddy trails, exhausted mules faltered under the strain, and drunken civilian teamsters overturned supplies, limiting the day's progress to just eleven miles. On June 10, after a grueling 27-mile push to Medicine Creek, Carr wrote a complaint to headquarters to headquarters lamenting shortages of saddles, carbines, and medical support, including the absence of ambulances for the growing number of sick and footsore troopers.

Lieutenant William J. Volkmar’s detachment spotted a small Cheyenne hunting party near the Platte River on June 12, only to lose them in a swift retreat across the rugged terrain. On June 13, the column struck the Republican River’s south bank, entering largely uncharted territory which Carr and his officers thenceforth carefully mapped. Cheyenne raiders struck the mule herd near Prairie Dog Creek at dusk on June 15, scattering the animals. Captain Luther H. North’s Pawnee scouts, eager to prove their worth despite Carr’s initial doubts about their reliability, repelled the attackers without orders, recovering the mules but earning a stern reprimand from Carr for breaching discipline.

The march pressed on despite long waterless stretches, failing horses dropping from exhaustion, injured soldiers being forced by the lack of ambulances to ride in supply wagons or limp along on foot. By late June, morale was suffering after three weeks of marching 25–30 miles daily across the open plains, chasing elusive Cheyenne trails. The arrival of a supply train from Fort McPherson at Thickwood Creek June 30 lifted the soldiers' spirits with deliveries of fresh mules, rations, and ammunition. On July 3, a scouting party finally returned with hope the Cheyenne were close: they had located a deserted Cheyenne camp along the Frenchman River (North Fork of the Republican), abandoned less than 36 hours earlier.

Carr drove his command westward in hot pursuit of the Cheyenne. On July 9, the column marched 30 miles through Colorado’s barren sandhills before camping amid choking dust and dwindling water supplies at a place they called “Bechers Battle ground”. The decisive push came on July 10, a punishing 32-mile march that crossed the winding Frenchman River eight times. Scouts discovered a series of abandoned camps, the last vacated that morning, with telltale prints of a white woman’s shoe, presumed to belong to either Susanna Alderdice or Maria Weichell, confirming they were closing in on the Dog Soldiers. Carr halted at this third camp, ordering a forced march that night to maintain the element of surprise. From July 10–11, the weary troops pressed 20 miles north under cover of darkness, their lanterns dimmed, until Pawnee scouts sighted Tall Bull’s village at 2 p.m. on July 11, setting the stage for the Battle of Summit Springs.

== Battle of Summit Springs ==
On July 11, 1869, Carr’s cavalrymen and 50 Pawnee scouts attacked Tall Bull’s camp near Summit Springs, Colorado. The surprise assault killed dozens Cheyenne, including Tall Bull, captured 17 women and children, and freed Maria Weichell. Susanna Alderdice, however, was killed by her captors during the chaos, a fate confirmed by witnesses who found her body with a fatal head wound, likely inflicted to prevent her rescue. Her death underscored the brutal stakes of the conflict, with Broome noting that Cheyenne warriors often killed captives when cornered, a grim reality of Plains warfare. The victory yielded significant spoils - over 400 horses and camp supplies - and severely undermined the Cheyenne's regional power.

== Aftermath ==
Arriving at Fort Sedgwick on July 15, Carr reported success, earning commendations from Augur, General W. H. Emory, and regional legislatures. The campaign facilitated settlement by neutralizing the Indian threat, though Carr soon left, grieving a personal loss. Subsequent operations confirmed the area’s pacification. The Battle of Summit Springs marked a turning point in the Indian Wars, accelerating settlement in the Republican River Valley.
