= Samuel Breck =

Samuel Breck may refer to:

- Samuel Breck (general) (1834–1918), Adjutant General of the U.S. Army
- Samuel Breck (politician) (1771–1862), member of the U.S. House of Representatives from Pennsylvania

== See also ==
- Breck (surname)
