= Breck =

Breck may refer to:

== People ==
- Daniel Breck (1788–1871), member of the U.S. House of Representatives from Kentucky
- Helena Breck, British actor
- James Lloyd Breck (1818–1876), priest, educator, and missionary of the Episcopal Church in the United States of America
- Joseph Berry Breck (1828–1865), officer in the United States Navy
- Julia Breck (1941–2020), British actress
- Peter Breck (1929–2012), American character actor
- Samuel Breck (general) (1834–1918), officer in the United States Army
- Samuel Breck (politician) (1771–1862), American politician from Pennsylvania

== Other ==
- USS Breck, a Clemson-class destroyer in the United States Navy
- Breck School, an independent college-preparatory preK–12 school in Golden Valley, Minnesota
- Breck Shampoo, American brand of shampoo
