= Treaty with the Pawnee (1857) =

1857 Treaty

Treaty with the Pawnee, 1857
Treaty Between the United States of America and the Pawnee Tribe
- Signed: September 24, 1857
- Location: Table Creek, Nebraska Territory
- Effective: February 11, 1858
- Signatories: James W. Denver (U.S.); Pawnee Chiefs and Headmen
- Parties: United States; Pawnee Tribe (Four Confederated Bands)
- Language: English

The Treaty with the Pawnee, 1857 was an agreement signed on September 24, 1857, between the United States, represented by Commissioner of Indian Affairs James W. Denver, and the chiefs and headmen of the four confederated bands of the Pawnee Tribe at Table Creek in the Nebraska Territory. Ratified by the U.S. Senate and proclaimed on February 11, 1858, the treaty ceded most remaining Pawnee lands in exchange for a permanent reservation, annuities, and federal protection from the Cheyenne and Sioux. Though intended to stabilize the Pawnee, the treaty’s promises of defense and support were poorly implemented, contributing to their decline and reliance on the U.S..

== Background ==
By the 1850s, the Pawnee faced escalating threats in their Central Plains homeland. The Treaty with the Pawnee, 1833 had ceded lands south of the Platte River and smallpox outbreaks (notably 1837) and relentless raids by Cheyenne and Sioux bands had reduced their population to around 5,000 by 1857. Accelerated American settlement following the Nebraska Territory’s organization in 1854 encroached on Pawnee hunting grounds and prompted demands for their confinement to a reservation. Earlier treaties (1833, 1848) had failed to deliver promised agricultural aid or protection, leaving the Pawnee vulnerable as Cheyenne aggression intensified, for instance in the devastating 1843 Battle at Blue Coat's Village. In September 1857, James W. Denver negotiated with a weakened Pawnee Nation to secure their remaining territory and formalize U.S. oversight.

== Terms ==
The treaty’s 11 articles outlined key provisions:

- Article 1: The Pawnee ceded all lands except a 30-by-15-mile reservation (288,000 acres) along the Loup Fork of the Platte River, near present-day Genoa, Nebraska.
- Article 2: The U.S. guaranteed this reservation as a permanent home, barring white settlement unless authorized.
- Article 3: The U.S. promised $40,000 annually in goods or money for 40 years—halved after 20 years—delivered at the reservation.
- Articles 4–5: The U.S. pledged $12,000 for a manual labor school and teacher for ten years, plus blacksmiths, farmers, and mills (one per band) with $1,200 in equipment annually for ten years, to promote agriculture.
- Article 6: The U.S. committed to protect the Pawnee from “all enemies,” Sioux and Cheyenne implicitly included, and to arbitrate tribal disputes.
- Article 8: The Pawnee agreed to cease hostilities with other tribes and submit to U.S. laws on the reservation.
- Article 10: The U.S. provided $10,000 in goods upon signing, acknowledged by the Pawnee.

The treaty bound both parties upon ratification.

== Outcomes ==
The treaty failed to deliver the protection and prosperity the Pawnee had hoped for. The Loup Fork reservation, though fertile, was too small for traditional hunting, and the U.S. failed to deliver consistent annuities, hindering agricultural development. Cheyenne and Sioux raids persisted, with a devastating 1873 attack at what would later be known as Massacre Canyon killing over 100 Pawnee. The manual labor school operated sporadically, closing by 1867 due to funding cuts, while mills and blacksmiths arrived years late, if at all. By 1869, the Pawnee population hovered near 3,000, and their poverty and reliance on the United States deepened, leading many Pawnee to join the U.S. Army as scouts.

== Significance ==
The 1857 treaty's failure to provide effective protection or economic stability left the Pawnee vulnerable, deepening their reliance on the United States. The treaty’s unfulfilled promises foreshadowed the Pawnee’s forced relocation to Oklahoma in 1875–1876.
