= Big Spotted Horse =

Pawnee warrior

Big Spotted Horse was a Pawnee warrior and raider who lived during the 19th century. He belonged to the Pitahawirata band or division of the Pawnee tribe.

Big Spotted Horse photographed in 1875 by John K. Hillers

== The killing of Alights-on-the-Clouds ==
In 1852, the Pawnee tribe, while engaged in the summer buffalo hunt, on the Solomon Fork in what is now Kansas were attacked by a band of Plains Indians. A Cheyenne warrior, Alights-on-the-Clouds (also known as Alight on the Cloud or Touching Cloud), who, unbeknownst to the Pawnee, was wearing a scalemail extending to his knees which effectively armored him from arrows and musket balls, gave chase to Big Spotted Horse, then a youth of 15 or 16. The youth fled but the warrior, intending to count coup on the boy before killing him, rode him down, approaching from the right. This gave him an advantage, as a right-handed person armed with a bow can usually only shoot effectively to the left. But Big Spotted Horse was left-handed, and as the warrior approached him, intending to count coup on him with a sheathed sword, Big Spotted Horse turned to the right and shot an arrow point blank at the Cheyenne warrior and pierced his eye.

Big Spotted Horse was not aware of the damage he had done, but there was a great shout by the Pawnee, and, fighting their way to the warrior's body they discovered he was wearing a leather coat armor covered with metal discs- scalemail. The loss of Alights-on-the-Clouds was very distressing to the Cheyenne who withdrew from the field and a cause of celebration for the Pawnee. They later made up a song about the deed and the unusual circumstances surrounding it to memorize the incident.

The exploit is attributed to Pawnee warrior Shield Chief (Carrying the Shield) by other sources.

== The great horse raid ==
Big Spotted Horse grew up to be a respected warrior and an expert horse thief. In 1869 he led a small party of Pawnee into a village of Cheyenne camped near the Arkansas River. They entered the village itself and untied the horses tied to the lodges, getting the best horses, then ran off the rest of the herd and set off for home with 600 horses. (One source states 150 horses). It was winter and the raiders were caught in a blizzard and suffered frostbite, but arrived at the Pawnee village with the herd intact. Raiding for horses had been concealed from the Indian agent, Jacob M. Troth, a Hicksite Quaker, but 600 horses were too many to conceal. Called before the Indian Agent, together with an interpreter, Big Spotted Horse, on being called a "big horse thief" thought at first that he was being complimented as a "great horse thief". He was soon disabused of that notion by the interpreter. The Indian agent demanded that the horses be returned to the Cheyenne; Big Spotted Horse, imagining the reaction of the Cheyenne, refused. He was imprisoned in Fort Omaha for 5 months but eventually released as it was determined that there was no actual law forbidding horse raiding. On return to the Pawnee village, Big Spotted Horse found that attrition had reduced the horse herd to only 30 or 40 head and that those had been returned to the Cheyenne in Kansas. Disgusted, he left to join the Wichita on the Red River in Oklahoma (Indian Territory).

== Scouting for the U.S. Army ==
Big Spotted Horse served at a time as scout for the U.S. Army. He made quite an impression of Officer Richard Henry Pratt, who described him as "a tall fine specimen of man who relished perilous service". While living in Oklahoma Big Spotted Horse served as scout during the Red River War in 1874.

== Reunion with the Wichita ==
Big Spotted Horse had made friends with the Wichita Indians before his great horse raid. The Wichita are a Caddoan tribe closely related to the Pawnee who did not accompany them on their migration to the north in the 17th century. In 1872 Big Spotted Horse returned to the Pawnee village and together with other warriors began to agitate for relocation of the tribe to the country of the Wichita who had invited the Pawnee to join them. This proposition was opposed by the Pawnee chiefs.

At the time of his visit, the Pawnees were troubled with white settlers stealing wood in the reservation. Late in 1873, Indian Agent Jacob Troth appointed a group of Pawnees, including Big Spotted Horse, to approach any timber thieves and stop them.

In 1874, Big Spotted Horse left the reservation with 300 followers, and in 1875, the entire tribe joined him, leaving their lands in Nebraska for much poorer lands in Oklahoma.

== Big Spotted Horse's last raid ==
Big Spotted Horse never returned from his last horse raid into Texas.

== Notes ==
- The Pawnee Indians by George Hyde, University of Oklahoma Press (1974, original hardback 1951), trade paperback, ISBN 0-8061-2094-0
