= Battle at Blue Coat's Village =

Lakota attack on a Pawnee village
Date	June 27, 1843
Location	Near Plum Creek, north of Loup River, present Nance County, Nebraska
Result	Lakota victory

Belligerents
Brule and Oglala Lakota	Kitkahahki and Tappage Pawnee

Commanders and leaders
Unknown	Blue Coat

Strength
Estimated 300 Lakotas	Around 40 earth lodges

Casualties and losses
Some, but unknown	More than 65-70 men and women killed, maybe some children.

Pawnee leader Blue Coat's village near the Loup River in Nebraska at a site called Plum Creek was attacked by a group of Lakota fighters on June 27, 1843. This was the worst blow to the Pawnee people until the attack in Massacre Canyon by the Lakota in 1873. Between 65 and 70 Pawnees were killed, scalped and mutilated, half of the earth lodges were burnt.

== Background ==
In the 1840s, the four divisions of Pawnee were living in villages of earth lodges along tributaries of the Loup River. The village of the Kitkahahki (or Republican) Pawnee people led by Blue Coat was located near Plum Creek, north of the Loup, in present Nance County, Nebraska. The village had 41 earth lodges of Pitahawiratas (or Tapages) and in addition "14 lodges of Republicans". (Some sources report a total of 41 lodges). The whites in a newly established Presbyterian mission about a mile away had an open view to the earth lodges.

For decades, the Pawnee and the Lakota had been enemies. "While the Pawnee power base was shrinking, their old enemies, the Lakota, were gaining strength...". The days before the attack, the villagers found worn out moccasins and feathers in the grass as well as signs of strangers moving around at night.

== The battle ==
A 300 strong force, possible of Brulé and Oglala Lakotas, made a large-scale attack on the village at dawn on June 27. "The enemy was so numerous they formed a line from the bluff to the river, which is over a mile". Waves of mounted warriors, many with firearms, dashed through the village. The Pawnee sent couriers out for help and protected as many earth lodges as possible. "Some of the women and children frightened and thinking themselves unsafe in the lodges ran out and started for the river and thus fell an easy prey to the enemy. Some children were taken captive". Around 8 o'clock, the attackers were in control of nearly half the village and set 20 lodges ablaze. Likely, it was at this occasion that a Lakota stumbled on one of the Cheyenne's four sacred arrows, the Mahuts. The Pawnee had won them in 1830, and Blue Coats's village may have watched over one of the trophies. Before noon, the hard-pressed inhabitants got reinforcement from villages further west. The Lakota retreated, taking around 200 of the Pawnees' horses with them.

During the attack, the whites nearby had stayed in their homes. They knew this was a matter between the Pawnee and the Lakota. However, the attackers killed a mixed blood Omaha woman living with a blacksmith and a mixed blood Pawnee interpreter, Louis LaChapelle.

With the attackers away, some from the mission hurried to the village. Here they, "...saw the dead, burning lodges also saw the confusion, heard the screeks & cries of the women and children ...". The Lakota had killed more than 65 Pawnee, among them chief Blue Coat. The Pawnee claimed they had neutralized many Lakotas, who had been carried off by their comrades.

== Later ==
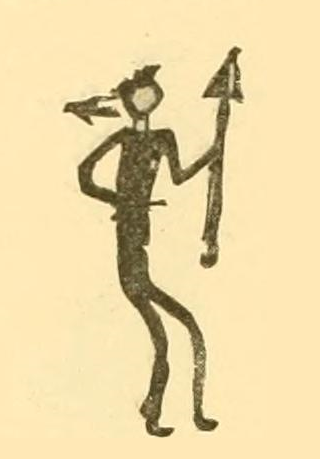
Battiste Good's winter count (Lakota). 1843–44. The return of a sacred arrow of the Cheyenne. During an attack on the Pawnees - likely Blue Coat's village - the Lakotas found one of the four sacred arrows of the Cheyennes. The Pawnees had won them in 1830, when the Cheyennes attacked a hunting camp on the open plains.

The day after the battle, missionary Samuel Allis helped burying a few of the dead. Far from the village, he found three Pawnees, killed and mutilated. Dead horses lay both in and out of the Indian town. Many of the villagers had already left the area, leaving early for the tribal summer hunt on the open plains.

The Lakota had recognized the unique Medicine Arrow of the Cheyennes. They gave it back to their allies, who already were in possession of one of the arrows lost 13 years before. "... the Brule Sioux captured a Pawnee village ... and in this camp they found another of the Medicine Arrows, which they returned to our tribe with great ceremonies" retells George Bent. (According to Bent, this was in 1837, but four Lakota winter counts give the year as 1843).

The next year some Pawnee braves told Lieutenant J. Henry Carleton about their plight. The Lakotas "burned our lodges and murdered our women and children". Carleton grieved over the death of Blue Coat. He had met the chief at Council Bluff one time and exchanged presents with him.

The deserted Pawnee village was not yet rebuilt, the refugees went to live in other villages. Likely, military surveyor G. K. Warren refers to Blue Coat's village in his 1857 expedition journal. "The [village] ... was lately deserted. The charred upright beams still standing".

The fighting between the Pawnees and the Lakotas continued. During the summer of 1845 a Lakota war party burned down "many earthlodges", while the inhabitants were away on a tribal hunt. Again, in 1860, some Lakotas set fire to "more than 60 lodges" in a Pawnee village, assisted by Cheyennes and Arapahos.
