= Killing of Alights on the Cloud =

Cheyenne warrior killed in 1852 battle with the Pawnee

Intertribal battle
| Date | Summer 1852 |
| Location | Western present-day Kansas |
| Result | Pawnee victory due to the killing of Alights on the Cloud |

Belligerents
| Cheyenne, Kiowa and Kiowa-Apache, maybe also Arapaho and Lakota | Pawnee |

Commanders and leaders
| Unknown | Unknown |

Strength
| Unknown, but many | Unknown, but a big Pawnee camp on summer hunt |

Casualties and losses
| Seven Cheyennes and a Kiowa Apache | Unknown, but some |
- The Cheyenne lost the noteworthy Alights on the Cloud during this battle. The loss was so severe that it could only be avenged by carrying the Sacred Arrows (the most potent war bundle of the Cheyenne) against the Pawnee in an all-out battle the next year.

The Cheyenne warrior Alights on the Cloud (Cheyenne: Vo'évȧhtoēšėstse), also known as Touching Cloud, was killed in combat by one of the Pawnee during an intertribal battle in 1852. Alights on the Cloud was in the leading party of warriors in an attack on a hunting camp of Pawnee foes in what is now Kansas. He is known for riding into battle in an unusual sort of metal armor hidden under his war shirt, which stopped the arrows of the Pawnee. Alights on the Cloud developed a reputation of being safe from all harm, until one of the Pawnee (Shield Chief) took out an old, sacred bow and arrow and managed to shoot him in the eye.

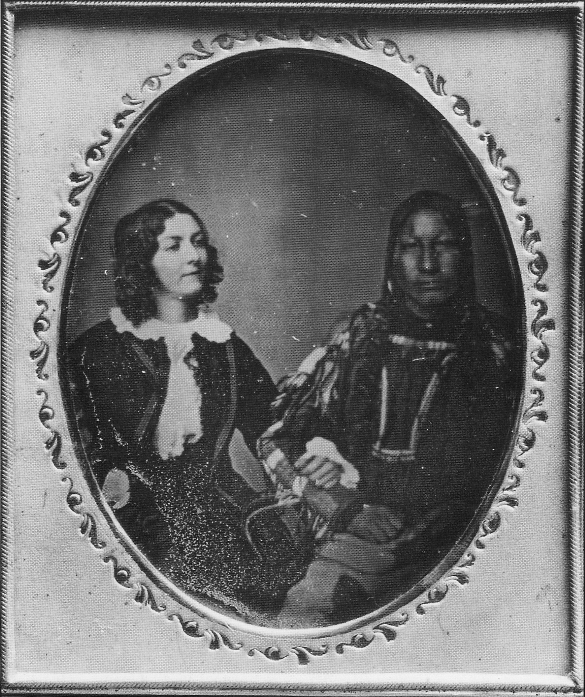
Lola Montez & Alights-on-a-Cloud, 1851 or 1852

The killing of Alights on the Cloud was a serious loss to the Cheyenne, and one of the factors leading to the war with the Pawnee the next summer, which was one of only six such all-out campaigns during the 19th century.

Some of the Kiowa people who fought alongside the Cheyenne recorded the killing of Alights on the Cloud in their winter count. The Pawnee remembered and passed on the story of the defeat in a song.

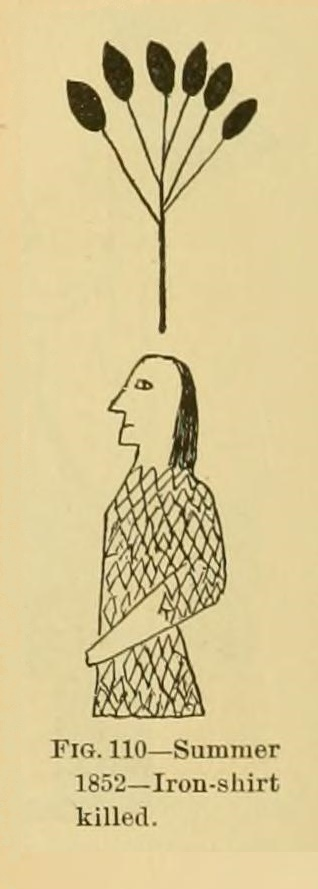
Cheyenne warrior Alights on the Cloud in his armor. Many Kiowa people joined the Cheyenne in an attack on the Pawnee in 1852. The branch with leaves over his head indicates that this took place in summer.

== Alights on the Cloud and his armor ==
Alights on the Cloud received his armor from his father, Medicine Water. Many years before, Medicine Water had bought it from a young Arapaho for a number of horses. This Arapaho had some time earlier exchanged a mule for the armor during a trading expedition to Mexico.

The origin of the armor is unknown. Many small iron scales, the size of a half-dollar, protected the wearer of this seemingly otherwise regular leather shirt against arrows and maybe even bullets. An iron cap with a flap covered the neck.

Medicine Water himself had used the mailed shirt during a large-scale attack on the Kiowa, the Kiowa Apache and the Comanche at Wolf Creek in Oklahoma in 1838. Alights on the Cloud bore it covered by a scarlet blanket during an open fight with some well-armed Delaware Indians in 1844 and turned the battle into victory.

== The attack on the Pawnee hunters ==
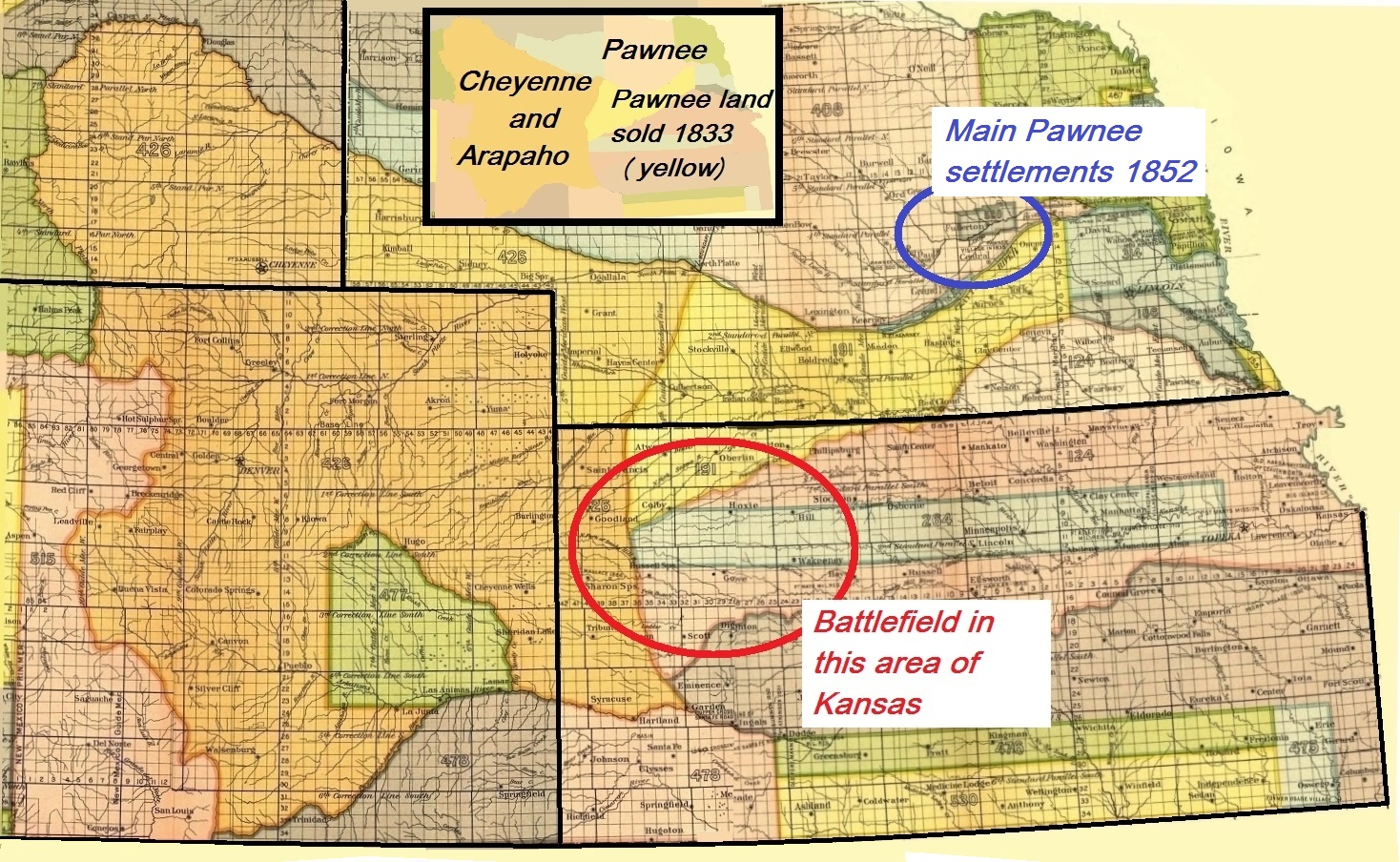
Map with the 1851 Cheyenne and Arapaho territory, the settlements by the Pawnee and the possible area of the battlefield in 1852.

The Pawnee were in camp somewhere in what is now western Kansas on their summer bison hunt. A combined force of Cheyennes and invited Kiowa and Kiowa Apaches attacked a large contingent of Pawnee hunters to achieve war honors and capture horses. Some Arapaho and Lakota friends of the Cheyenne may have joined.

Alights on the Cloud rode in the advanced party of warriors. Protected by his covered armor he charged the Pawnee. According to the Pawnee, he attacked with a sword. The stiffness of the armor prevented him from using other weapons. The hunters retreated, recklessly followed by Alights on the Cloud. "The Pawnee were unable to explain the fearlessness of this man and talked of it among themselves."

A young Pitahawirata Pawnee, named variously Shield Chief and Carrying the Shield, was the keeper of a sacred bundle with an old bow and a red arrow. His father had told him to use them in times of great danger. Armed with the sacred weapons from the bundle he went to the battlefield on foot. The Pawnee fled from the enemies, while Shield Chief advanced. When Alights on the Cloud attacked him, he released the arrow and hit the Cheyenne in the eye.

The Pawnee rushed forward to Alights on the Cloud. They cut up his body and discovered the armor. Consequently, the Pawnees know Alights on the Cloud as Iron Shirt.

During the fight a number of Pawnee were also killed, along with six more Cheyenne and one of the Kiowa Apache.

== After the battle ==
The Pawnee captured a part of the armored shirt. The Cheyenne secured the remainder and kept it for many years until they hid it in a hole in the ground.

To avenge the killing of Alights on the Cloud and the other warriors, the Cheyenne carried their Sacred Arrows against the Pawnee the next year. The arrows are known as the Mahuts, and they are four and sacred arrows used in ceremonies where political decisions are made. Only six such "moves of the Sacred Arrows" or campaigns of all-out war are recorded in the entire history of the Cheyenne. They "were defeated with great loss."

The killing of the "arrow-proof" Cheyenne inspired the Pawnee to compose a song:

Now he lies yonder. He who has on a metal shirt. The protection in which he trusted is set aside."

A Kiowa winter count documents the killing of Alights on the Cloud (called Far Up by the Kiowa) during the summer of 1852.
