= Department of the Platte =

Coordinates: 42°N 104°W

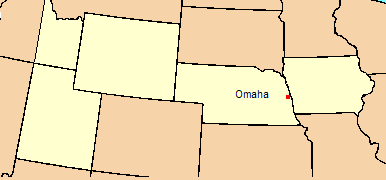
- The Department of the Platte as it existed beginning June 22, 1875.
- Active: 1866–1898
- Country: United States
- Branch: Army
- Type: administrative district
- Part of: Division of the Missouri
- Headquarters: Omaha, Nebraska; Fort Omaha

Commanders
- Notable commanders: George Crook; Oliver O. Howard

The Department of the Platte was a military administrative district established by the U.S. Army on March 5, 1866, with boundaries encompassing Iowa, Nebraska, Dakota Territory, Utah Territory and a small portion of Idaho. With headquarters in Omaha, the district commander oversaw the army's role initially along the Overland route (or Oregon Trail) to Salt Lake City, then later the construction route of the Union Pacific Railroad. The district also included the Montana road (or Bozeman Trail) through eastern Wyoming. The district was discontinued when the Army's command was reorganized in 1898.

== Headquarters ==
The Headquarters of the Department of the Platte was located in downtown Omaha, Nebraska, for many years. When the headquarters was transferred to Fort Omaha in 1878, the building it was located in was found unsuitable, and the headquarters were again transferred downtown.

== Notable Campaigns ==
- Powder River Expedition (1865), against the Lakota, Cheyenne, and Arapaho in the Powder River Basin. While predating the official creation of the Department of the Platte in 1866, the units involved were later assigned to the Department of the Platte, and the Powder River Expedition set the stage for its organization.
- Republican River Expedition (1869)
- Red Cloud's War and subsequent conflicts in the 1860s and 1870s against the Lakota, Cheyenne, and Arapaho to protect the Bozeman Trail
- Great Sioux War (1876–1877)
- Bannock War (1878)
- Fort Robinson Breakout (1879)
- Ghost Dance War (1890–1891)

== Department commanders ==
- Brigadier General Philip St. George Cooke, March 5, 1866
- Major General Christopher C. Augur, January 23, 1867
- Brigadier General Edward Ord, November 18, 1871
- Brigadier General George Crook, April 27, 1875
- Brigadier Oliver O. Howard, September 5, 1882
- Colonel John Gibbon, March 6, 1884 (temporary)
- Brigadier General Oliver O. Howard, October 25, 1884
- Brigadier General George Crook, April 28, 1886
- Brigadier General John R. Brooke, 1888
- Brigadier General John J. Coppinger, March 17, 1895

== Camps, forts and posts ==
=== Idaho Territory and Idaho ===
- Fort Hall (1870 - 1883)

=== Nebraska Territory and Nebraska ===
- Alkali Station (1864 - 1866)
- Beauvais Ranch Station Post (1864 - 1866)
- Camp at Chadron (1890 - 1891)
- Camp Keya Paha (1879)
- Camp at Madden's Bridge (1890 - 1891)
- Camp Mitchell (1864 - 1867)
- Camp Red Willow (1872)
- Camp Sheridan (1874 - 1881)
- Camp at Stryker's Ranch (1890 - 1891)
- Camp at Swallow's Ranch (1890 - 1891)
- Camp at Hay Springs (1890 - 1891)
- Camp near Cheney's Ranch (1890 - 1891)
- Camp at Roger's Mill (1890 - 1891)
- Camp at Jareho's Ranch (1890 - 1891)
- Camp at Morey's Ranch (1890 - 1891)
- Camp at Gordon (1890 - 1891)
- Camp at Callin's Ranch (1890 - 1891)
- Camp at Albany (1890 - 1891)
- Fort Beaver Valley (1891)
- Fort Clarke (1876 - unknown)
- Fort Crook (1891 - 1948/present)
- Fort Hartsuff, originally Post on the North Fork Loup River (1874 - 1881)
- Fort Kearny (1848 - 1871)
- Fort Kiowa (1864 - 1866)
- Fort McPherson (1863 - 1880)
- Fort Mirage Flats (1891)
- Fort Montrose (1891)
- Fort Niobrara (1880 - 1906/1911)
- Post of Omaha (1862 - 1866)
  - Camp Sherman or Sherman Barracks (1866 - 1869)
    - Omaha Barracks (1869 - 1878)
      - Fort Omaha (1878 - 1896/1905 - 1947)
- Fort Ponca (1865 - 1866)
- Post at Red Cloud Indian Agency or Camp Robinson (1874 - 1878)
  - Fort Robinson (1878 - 1948)
- Sidney Barracks (1867 - 1878)
  - Fort Sidney (1878 - 1894)
- Guide Rock Stockade (1870)
- Gilman's Station Post (1864 - 1866) +
- Junction Station Post (1864 - 1866) +
- Little Blue River Station Post (1864 - 1866)
- North Platte Station (1867 - 1881) +
- O'Fallon's Bluffs Post (1864 - 1866) +
- Omaha Quartermaster Depot (1866 - 1947)
- Pawnee Ranch Post (1864 - 1866) +
- Plum Creek Post (1864 - 1866)
- Post at Mullaly's Ranch Station (1864 - 1866) +
- Post on the South Fork Loup River (1865)
- Post at North Platte Station (1867 - 1881) +
- Red Cloud Stockade (1870)

=== Utah Territory and Utah ===
- Bluff Fort (1880 - ?)
- Camp Conness (1855, 1859, 1864, 1866, 1869)
- Camp Dodge (1865 - 1866)
- Camp Fountain Green (1866)
- Camp George (1866)
- Camp Murray (1885)
- Camp Pace (1867)
- Camp Rawlins (1870 - 1871)
- Cove Fort (1867 - 1880s)
- Fort Bear River (1867 - unknown)
- Fort Berryville (1864 - 1866)
- Fort Cameron (1872 - 1883)
- Fort Deseret (1866 - unknown)
- Fort Douglas (1862 - 1991)
- Fort Duchesne (1886 - 1910)
- Fort Gunnison (1861 - 1867?)
- Fort Kanab (1865 - 1870)
- Fort Meeks (1869 - 1870)
- Fort Montezuma (1879 - 1884)
- Fort Pierce (1866 - 1870?)
- Fort Thornburgh (1881 - 1882)
  - New Fort Thornburgh (1882 - 1884)
- Fort Union (1853 - 1870s)
- Fort Walker (1853 - 1869)
  - Fort Hamilton (1869 - ?)
- Fort Wah-Wiep (1869 - 1870)
- Grouse Creek Fort (1878)
- Kamas Fort (1868 - 1870)
- Ogden Station (1878)
- Panguitch Fort (1865 - 1868)
- Rock Fort (1865 - unknown)
- Sage Bottom Fort (1867 - unknown)

=== Wyoming Territory and Wyoming ===
(Wyoming Territory was transferred from the Department of Dakota on July 25, 1868)

- Big Pond Station (1860s) +
- Black Butte Station (1860s) +
- Camp Bridger Pass (1867) +
- Camp Devin (1878)
- Camp Elkins (1892)
- Camp Hat Creek (1876 - 1877)
- Camp Marshall (1862 - 1866)
- Camp Medicine Butte (1885 - 1887)
- Camp on the Snake River (1879 - 1883)
- Camp Pilot Butte (1885 - 1899)
- Camp Stambaugh
- Cheyenne Depot or Camp Carlin (1867 - 1890)
- Dug Springs Station (1860s) +
- Duck Lake Station (1860s) +
- Fort Bridger (1843 - 1878, 1880 - 1890)
- Fort Caspar (1866 - 1867)
- Fort David A. Russell (1867 - 1930)
- Fort Fetterman (1867 - 1882)
- Fort Fred Steele
- Fort Halleck (1862 - 1866)
- Fort LaClede (1863 - 1869)
- Fort Laramie (1834 - 1890)
- Fort Phil Kearny first called New Fort Reno and Fort Carrington (1866 - 1868)
- Fort Rawlins (1868 - unknown)
- Fort Connor (1865)
  - Fort Reno (1866 - 1868)
- Fort McKinney (1876 - 1894)
- Fort Sanders (1866 - 1882)
- Camp at Wind River Indian Agency (1868)
  - Camp Augur (1869)
    - Camp Brown (1870)
      - Fort Washakie (1871 - 1909)
- Pine Grove Station (1860s) +
- Point of Rocks Station (1860s) +
- Rock Creek Station (1860 - unknown)
- Rock Springs Station (1860s) +
- Salt Wells Station (1860s) +
- Sulpher Springs Station (1860s) +
- Washakie Station (1860s) +

== See also ==
- Battle of the Little Bighorn
- Enoch Crowder
