= USS Breck =

Clemson-class destroyer

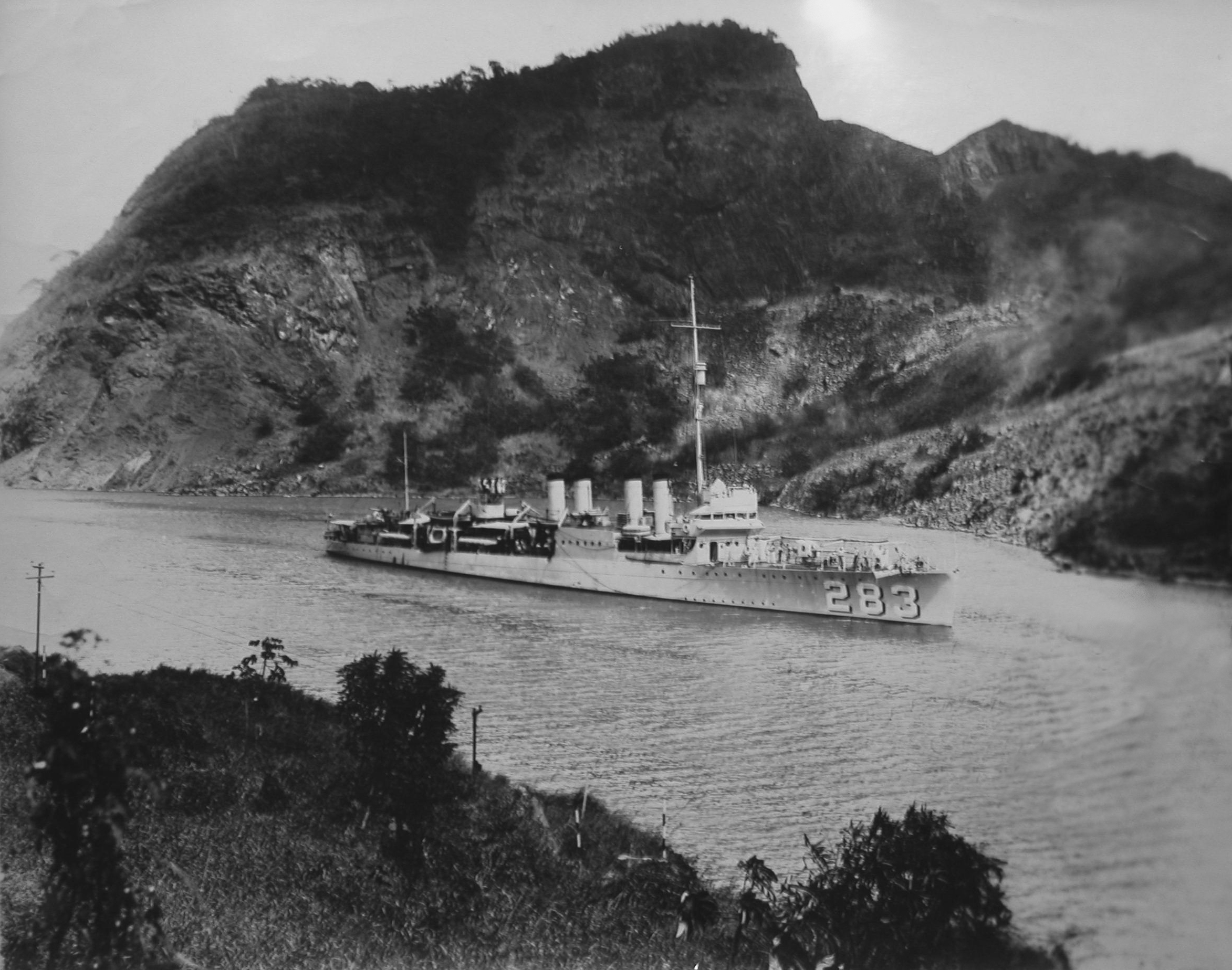

History

United States
- Namesake: Joseph Berry Breck
- Builder: Bethlehem Shipbuilding Corporation, Squantum Victory Yard
- Cost: $1,217,835.79 (hull & machinery)
- Laid down: 8 May 1919
- Launched: 5 September 1919
- Commissioned: 1 December 1919
- Decommissioned: 1 May 1930
- Fate: Sold for scrapping, 17 January 1931

General characteristics
- Class & type: Clemson-class destroyer
- Displacement: 1,215 tons
- Length: 314 feet 4 inches (95.81 m)
- Beam: 31 feet 8 inches (9.65 m)
- Draft: 9 feet 10 inches (3.00 m)
- Propulsion: 26,500 shp (20 MW); geared turbines, 2 screws
- Speed: 35 knots (65 km/h)
- Range: 4,900 nautical miles (9,100 kilometres); @ 15 kt
- Complement: 122 officers and enlisted
- Armament: 4 × 4 in (102 mm)/50 guns, 1 × 3 in (76 mm)/25 gun, 12 × 21 inch (533 mm) torpedo tubes

USS Breck (DD-283) was a Clemson-class destroyer in the United States Navy following World War I. She was named for Joseph Berry Breck.

== History ==
Breck was launched 5 September 1919 by Bethlehem Shipbuilding Corporation, Squantum, Massachusetts, sponsored by Mrs. Forest MacNee, granddaughter of Lieutenant Commander Breck; and commissioned 1 December 1919.

Breck served with the Atlantic Fleet, attached to Destroyer Squadron 1 and for six months operated in the Caribbean area. From 15 July 1920 until June 1921, she was at Newport, Rhode Island, in reserve commission, having only limited duty training Naval Reserves on the Atlantic coast. In June 1921, she rejoined the Destroyer Force and participated in scheduled drills and exercises along the Atlantic coast and for a time had special duty in connection with the calibration of coastal Radio Compass Stations.

In June 1922, she joined Squadrons Escorting fleet, and annually took part in squadron and fleet operations. In August 1925, her home yard was changed from Boston, Massachusetts, to Norfolk Navy Yard and Breck was attached to Destroyer Division 25. As a unit of that Division, she served with United States Naval Forces Europe, between June 1926 and June 1927, showing the flag along the European and North African coasts and engaging in target and engineering competition. Upon returning to the United States, she put in at New York Navy Yard and then proceeded to Newport where she embarked Naval Reserves for the training cruise with the Scouting Fleet. The succeeding years were similar in the established routine of gunnery practice, war games, and maneuvers until the end of September 1929 when Breck arrived with other units of Destroyer Squadron 9 at Philadelphia Navy Yard, ending her active service. Breck was decommissioned 1 May 1930 and sold 17 January 1931.

As of 2005, no other ships have been named Breck.
