= Samuel Breck (general) =

United States Army general

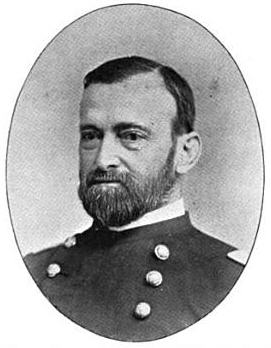
- Samuel Breck
- Born: February 25, 1834; Middleborough, Massachusetts, U.S.
- Died: February 23, 1918 (aged 83); Brookline, Massachusetts, U.S.
- Military career
- Allegiance: (United States) United States; Union
- Branch: United States Army; Union Army
- Service years: 1855–1898
- Rank: Brigadier General
- Commands: Adjutant General of the U.S. Army
- Conflicts: Third Seminole War; American Civil War; American Indian Wars

Samuel Breck (February 25, 1834 – February 23, 1918) was an officer in the United States Army who served as Adjutant General of the U.S. Army from 1897 to 1898.

== Early career ==
Born in Middleborough, Massachusetts, to one of the oldest families in the state, Breck entered the United States Military Academy at West Point on July 1, 1851. He graduated seventh in his class on July 1, 1855, and was commissioned second lieutenant of artillery. While with the 1st Artillery, he served in Florida during the Third Seminole War.

Breck served at several forts along both the Atlantic and Gulf coasts from 1856 to 1860. From 1856 into 1857 he was at the garrison at Fort Moultrie in South Carolina. He served at Fort McHenry in Maryland from 1857 to 1859. In 1859 he marched from Helena, Arkansas to Fort Clark, Texas. Later in 1859 into 1860, he was again in the garrison at Fort Moultrie, South Carolina.

At Auburndale, Massachusetts, on September 23, 1857, Breck married Caroline Juliet Barrett (b. May 18, 1832), daughter of Samuel and Anne Juliet (Eddy) Barrett. They had two children: Amelia, born August 25, 1860, at Fort Moultrie, South Carolina, died in infancy; and, Samuel, born August 8, 1862, in Washington, D.C., who became a practicing physician in Boston.

From September 24, 1860, to April 26, 1861, Breck served at West Point as assistant professor of geography, History and Ethics. From April 26 to December 3, 1861, he was Principal Assistant Professor of Geography, History, and Ethics, during which time he was a first lieutenant with the 1st Artillery from April 11, 1861, to February 20, 1862. Breck was promoted to captain on November 19, 1861.

== Civil War ==
On November 29, 1861, Breck became staff captain—assistant adjutant general of General Irvin McDowell's division of the Army of the Potomac, which defended Washington, D.C., during the American Civil War or, as it was characterized at the time by the Union, "the Rebellion of the Seceding States."

On March 24, 1862, Breck became assistant adjutant general of the 1st Army Corps. From April 4 to June 20, 1862, he was assistant adjutant general of the Department of the Rappahannock. On April 18, 1862, he was engaged in the occupation of Falmouth, Virginia, on the north side of the Rappahannock River opposite Fredericksburg, Virginia He was commissioned major, additional aide-de-camp on May 23, 1862. In late May and early June, he was part of Union Brigadier General Irvin McDowell's unsuccessful expedition to the Shenandoah Valley to intercept the Confederate forces under General Stonewall Jackson and cut off their avenue of retreat from Winchester, Virginia.

On July 2, 1862, Breck took the post of assistant in the adjutant general's office in Washington, which he held until the end of the war. He was in charge of "Rolls, Returns, Books, Blanks and business pertaining to the enlisted men of the Regular and Volunteer Forces, and of the records of discontinued commands and the preparation and publication of the 'Volunteer Army Register.'"

Samuel was successively brevetted lieutenant colonel (September 24, 1864), colonel (March 13, 1865) and brigadier general (appointed March 8, 1866, and confirmed May 4, 1866, to rank from March 13, 1865 "for diligent, faithful and meritorious service in the adjutant general's department during the rebellion").

== Later career ==
Breck remained in the Adjutant General's Department following the end of the war. From 1879, he served in California, New York, Washington, D. C., and Minnesota. From 1885 he served as adjutant general for various departments, including the Department of the Platte, Omaha, Nebraska, and the Department of Dakota. He was promoted to lieutenant colonel assistant adjutant general February 28, 1887.

In August 1893 he returned to the Adjutant General's Department in Washington as a colonel, and on September 11, 1897, was elevated by President William McKinley and Secretary of War Russell Alger to Adjutant General of the U. S. Army with the rank of brigadier general. He retired in February 1898, and died in February 1918 in Brookline, Massachusetts.

== See also ==
- List of Massachusetts generals in the American Civil War
- Massachusetts in the American Civil War

== Notes ==
Military offices
| Preceded by George D. Ruggles | Adjutant General of the U. S. Army; September 11, 1897-February 25, 1898 | Succeeded by Henry C. Corbin |
