= Joseph Berry Breck =

US Navy officer

- Born: July 12, 1828; Maine
- Died: July 26, 1865 (aged 37); San Francisco, California
- Military career
- Allegiance: United States of America
- Branch: United States Navy
- Service years: 1863–1864
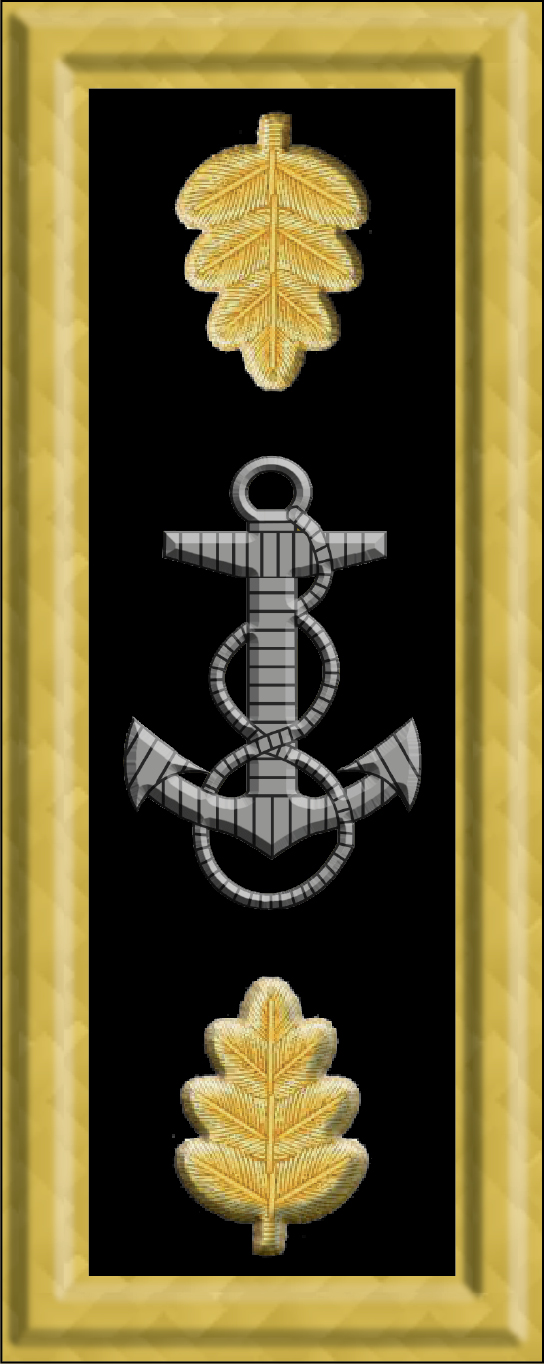
- Rank: Lieutenant commander
- Commands: USS Niphon
- Conflicts: American Civil War

Joseph Berry Breck (July 12, 1828 – July 26, 1865) was an officer in the United States Navy during the American Civil War.

== Biography ==
Breck was born in Maine, the son of Benjamin Dunton Breck and Jane S. Simmons. Breck had a successful career in the American mercantile marine as a shipmaster and businessman, and at the outbreak of the Civil War was engaged in the Pacific and China trade, but soon offered his services to the Navy Department. He was eventually commissioned as an Acting Ensign on February 27, 1863. From April 24, 1863 he commanded the screw steamer Niphon, taking a prominent part in the destruction of the saltworks at Masonboro Inlet, North Carolina, on August 27, 1864, and on many other expeditions ashore. He received rapid promotion; to Acting Master on August 8, 1863, to Acting Volunteer Lieutenant on November 16, 1863, and to Acting Volunteer Lieutenant Commander on November 25, 1864.

Although his health was much impaired, Breck remained in command of Niphon until invalided out of the service by a medical board in November 1864. (His younger brother Lowell Mason Breck (1839–1863), who served under him aboard Niphon, was also invalided out of the Navy suffering from "consumption", from which he soon died.) Seeking a climate conducive to his recovery Lt-Cdr. Breck travelled to San Francisco, California, but died on July 26, 1865, soon after his arrival there. He was buried in Arlington National Cemetery.

== Personal life ==
Breck was married twice, firstly to Fredonia Gaston, and after her death to Ellen Francis Newell, by whom he had four children; twin daughters, who died in infancy, and two sons. The eldest son, John Leslie Breck (1860–1899) became a noted impressionist painter, while the younger, Edward Breck (1861–1929) was a scholar, journalist, champion golfer and fencer, and an officer of U.S. Naval Intelligence during the Spanish–American and First World Wars.

== Namesake ==
The destroyer Breck (DD-283) (1919–1930) was named for him.
