= Treaty with the Pawnee (1833) =

1833 Treaty

Treaty with the Pawnee, 1833
Treaty Between the United States of America and the Four Confederated Bands of Pawnees
- Signed: October 9, 1833
- Location: Grand Pawnee Village, Platte River, Nebraska Territory
- Effective: April 12, 1834
- Signatories: Henry L. Ellsworth (U.S.); Pawnee Chiefs and Headmen
- Parties: United States; Four Confederated Bands of Pawnee (Grand Pawnees, Pawnee Loups, Pawnee Republicans, Pawnee Tappaye)
- Language: English

The Treaty with the Pawnee, 1833 was an agreement signed on October 9, 1833 between the United States, represented by Commissioner Henry L. Ellsworth, and the chiefs and headmen of the four confederated bands of the Pawnee Nation (Grand Pawnees, Pawnee Loups, Pawnee Republicans, and Pawnee Tappaye) at the Grand Pawnee Village on the Platte River. Ratified by the U.S. Senate and proclaimed on April 12, 1834, the treaty ceded Pawnee lands south of the Platte River to the U.S., established a common hunting ground, and provided payments and services to transition the Pawnee toward agriculture. The treaty was never fully implemented, and its failure exacerbated the Pawnee's struggles against disease and enemy tribes setting the stage for later conflicts.

== Background ==
By the 1830s, the Pawnee Nation, comprising four bands — Chaui (Grand Pawnees), Kitkahahki (Pawnee Republicans), Pitahawirata (Pawnee Tappaye), and Skidi (Pawnee Loups) — faced mounting pressures in their Central Plains homeland. A smallpox epidemic in 1831 had halved their population to around 6,000–8,000, while Cheyenne, Sioux, and displaced eastern tribes encroached on their territory, disrupting buffalo hunts. In October 1833, Ellsworth met Pawnee leaders to secure land cessions and establish peace, amid a language barrier bridged by English-to-French-to-Pawnee translations, complicating consensus.

== Terms ==
The treaty’s 14 articles outlined mutual obligations:

- Article 1: The Pawnee ceded all lands south of the Platte River to the U.S.
- Article 2: These lands would remain a common hunting ground for the Pawnee and other "friendly Indians," subject to presidential discretion.
- Article 3: The U.S. promised $4,600 annually in goods for 12 years—$1,300 each to the Grand Pawnees and Republicans, $1,000 each to the Loups and Tappaye—partly compensating the Grand Pawnees for relocating north of the Platte.
- Articles 4–8: The U.S. pledged $500 per band in agricultural tools for five years, $1,000 annually for schools for ten years, farmers with $1,000 in livestock per band for five years, and a horse-mill per band for grinding corn—contingent (per Article 10) on the Pawnee settling in agricultural districts year-round.
- Article 9: The Pawnee vowed peace with the U.S. and neighboring tribes, agreeing to arbitrate disputes via a presidential appointee.
- Article 13: The U.S. delivered $1,600 in goods upon signing, acknowledged by the Pawnee.

Signed by Ellsworth and Pawnee leaders like Ta-re-kas-a-weet (Big Chief) and La-ta-ker-a-sa-roo (Eagle Chief), the treaty bound both parties upon ratification.

== Outcomes ==
The treaty’s implementation failed due to cultural misunderstandings and non-compliance by both the United States and the Pawnee. The Pawnee, valuing seasonal buffalo hunts over permanent farming, rarely stayed in villages year-round as Article 10 required, delaying promised services. A second smallpox outbreak in 1837 killed hundreds, and Sioux raids, like the 1843 Willow Creek attack which killed 70 Pawnee, intensified their vulnerability. U.S. officials, citing Article 10, offered the promised farmers, mills, and livestock only sporadically. Missionary John Dunbar criticized this as a death sentence, noting, "to remain in farming villages for one year… is the same as saying all will die within one year" (1840 letter). By the mid-1840s, the Pawnee abandoned their southern villages, and the U.S. had ended its efforts to encourage their agricultural development, leaving the treaty unfulfilled.

== Significance ==
The Treaty with the Pawnee, 1833 aimed to transform the Pawnee into sedentary farmers while opening lands for settlement. Its failure, due to Pawnee resistance to abandoning hunting traditions and U.S. refusal to honor terms absent compliance, deepened Pawnee hardship, reducing their population and power by the 1860s. This vulnerability fueled later Cheyenne raids, resulting in cooperation between the US Army and the Pawnee against their mutual enemy.
