= Silas Bent (disambiguation) =

Silas Bent (1888–1945) was an American journalist, author, and lecturer.

Silas Bent may also refer to:

- Silas Bent (naval officer) (1820–1887), U.S. Naval officer prior to the American Civil War, assigned to the Hydrographic Division of the Coast Survey
- USNS Silas Bent, Silas Bent-class U.S. Navy hydrographic survey ship
- Silas Bent (judge) (1768–1827), judge on the Missouri Supreme Court
