= William Bent =

American rancher and frontier trader (1809–1869)

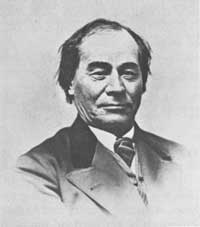
- Born: William Wells Bent; May 23, 1809; St. Louis, Missouri, US
- Died: May 19, 1869 (aged 59); Kansas City, Missouri, US
- Resting place: Las Animas Cemetery, south of Las Animas, Colorado
- Occupations: frontiersman, trader, rancher, explorer
- Employer(s): partner with Charles, George, and Robert Bent and Ceran St. Vrain
- Spouse(s): three Native American wives who were sisters: Owl Woman, Yellow Woman, and Island (Cheyenne); Mixed-blood wife; Adaline Harvey
- Children: six, including George
- Parent(s): Silas Bent (father); Mary Carter (mother)
- Relatives: Charles Bent (brother); Silas Bent III (brother); Edmund Guerrier (son-in-law); Lilburn Boggs (brother-in-law); Silas Bent IV (nephew); Henry C. Boggs (nephew); Charles Marion Russell (nephew); James Kerr (uncle); Harvey Pratt (great-great-grandson)

William Wells Bent (May 23, 1809 – May 19, 1869) was a frontier trader and rancher in the American West, with forts in Colorado. He also acted as a mediator among the Cheyenne Nation, other Native American tribes and the expanding United States. With his brothers, Bent established a trade business along the Santa Fe Trail. In the early 1830s Bent built an adobe fort, called Bent's Fort, along the Arkansas River in present-day Colorado. Furs, horses and other goods were traded for food and other household goods by travelers along the Santa Fe trail, fur-trappers, and local Mexican and Native American people. Bent negotiated a peace among the many Plains tribes north and south of the Arkansas River, as well as between the Native American and the United States government.

In 1835 Bent married Owl Woman, the daughter of White Thunder, a Cheyenne chief and medicine man. Together they had four children. Bent was accepted into the Cheyenne tribe and became a sub-chief. In the 1840s, according to the Cheyenne custom for successful men, Bent took Owl Woman's sisters, Yellow Woman and Island, as secondary wives. He had his fifth child with Yellow Woman. After Owl Woman died in 1847, Island cared for her children. Each of the sisters left Bent and, in 1869, he married the young Adaline Harvey, the educated mixed-race daughter of Alexander Harvey, a friend who was a prominent American fur trader in Kansas City, Missouri. Bent died shortly after their marriage, and Adaline bore their daughter, his sixth child, after his death.

== Early years ==
William Wells Bent was born May 23, 1809 St. Louis, Missouri, a son of Silas Bent and his wife, Martha (nee Kerr) Bent. His father was later appointed as a justice of the Missouri Supreme Court. William was one of the Bents' eleven children. The first three were born in Charleston, Virginia, present-day West Virginia and the remaining children were born in St. Louis after the family migrated there.

His uncle (Martha Kerr's brother), James Kerr, served in the Missouri House of Representatives and Missouri State Senate and later led colonization, military, and political matters in Texas.

Three of William's brothers, George, Charles, and Robert, partnered with him in trading with Native Americans in the West. Robert and George died at Bent's Fort (1846 and 1841, respectively). Charles was the oldest son, born in 1799, and the remaining brothers were born in or after 1806. Later based in Santa Fe, Charles Bent lived in Taos. He served briefly as the first territorial governor of New Mexico.

== Bent trading empire ==
=== Trapping, stockades and trading ===
Charles, George, Robert, and William Bent partnered in the fur trade with Ceran St. Vrain, also a St. Louis native. The city had several major fur trading families. They left Missouri about 1826 to explore what is now southern Colorado along the upper Arkansas River to trap for furs and establish a trade business. Within a couple of years, the Bents and St. Vrain had built two stockades, one near the present town of Pueblo, Colorado and the other stockade either at the mouth of the Purgatoire River, or on the northern side of the Arkansas River. The historian Grinnell suggested that William Bent was likely trapping furs before the first stockade was built. St. Vrain and his older brother, Charles, made the round trips to St. Louis, a regional trading center, to sell furs and return with supplies. (Note: George Bent has stated that there were two stockades built, the first near Pueblo about 1826 and the second at the mouth of the Purgatoire in 1828. A man named Jacob Fowler said the first stockade was built on the north side of the Arkansas River.)

To set up their trading venture, the brothers used a legacy of their father, Judge Silas Bent. The brothers reinvested the substantial profits of their enterprise to develop their business.

=== Bent's Old Fort ===
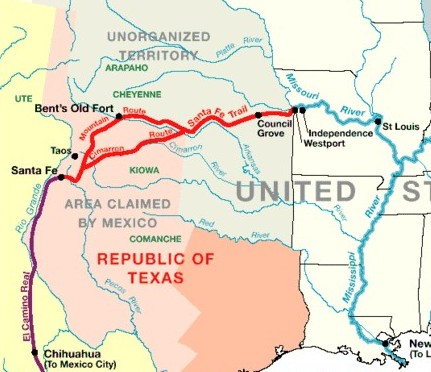
1845 Santa Fe Trail and native tribal lands

By around 1832, although possibly as late as 1834, the partners built a permanent trading post called Bent's Fort. The elaborate adobe construction could accommodate 200 people, and had been built on the northern "Mountain Route" of the Santa Fe Trail, by then open for business. The partners picked this location after discussions with the Cheyenne; it was near La Junta and land occupied by the Cheyenne and Arapaho tribes. It became an important center of trade, principally in furs but also in numerous other goods, including horses and mules.

William and Charles operated the fort in partnership with Ceran St Vrain, a fur trader who had already established significant trading contacts in New Mexico. (Note: Varnell states that another brother, George, was also a partner at some point. Grinnell (1913) says that George, Robert, another Bent brother, and also other people, were partners at some stage but not at the outset; by 1923 he changed his opinion and said that neither George nor Robert was a partner.) Sometimes referred to as Fort William, the post was in "the perfect place at the perfect time" for someone looking to make money from trading. For example, the Bents could buy a gallon of brandy in St Louis for US$ 2 and sell it at the fort for US$ 25.

The historian Anne Hyde has dated the moment when the Cheyenne chief White Thunder realized a common interest with Bent. In November 1833, they talked together as a meteor shower lit up the sky over the plains. Many Cheyenne believed that the celestial event was a signal of the end of the world; it was subsequently referred to as "the Night the Stars Fell". White Thunder saw it as a new beginning. He sought a truce with the Pawnee and the return of the four sacred arrows which they had captured in a battle with the Cheyenne earlier that year. To achieve this, White Thunder made a solo, unarmed visit to the Pawnee village to seek peace and returned with two of the arrows and an agreement.

White Thunder also arranged a formal marital alliance between Bent and his daughter Owl Woman. He believed that their children would represent another element of the new beginning, of peace for the Cheyenne and the region. By this time Bent had learned the language of the Cheyenne, and he was known as Little White Man by the native tribes. When the Bents first met with the Cheyenne, the Indians gave them names in the Cheyenne language. The Bent brothers' respect for the Cheyenne protocols during the convivial occasion created a relationship base for their future development of the fort and trading.

=== Life at Bent's Old Fort ===
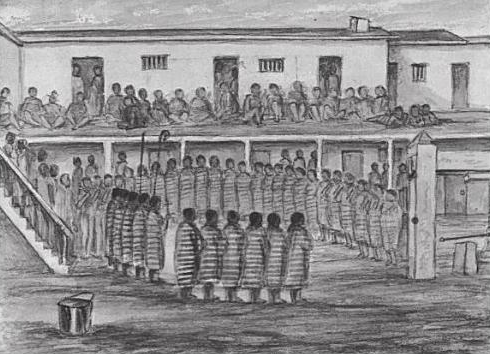
Bent's Fort in 1848

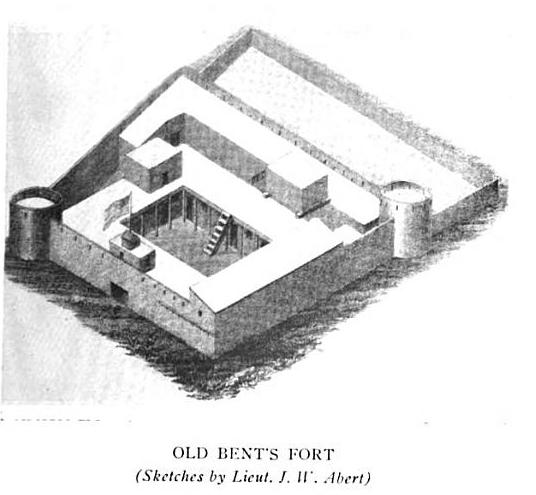
Old Bent's Fort, Sketch by Lt. James Abert, published 1914

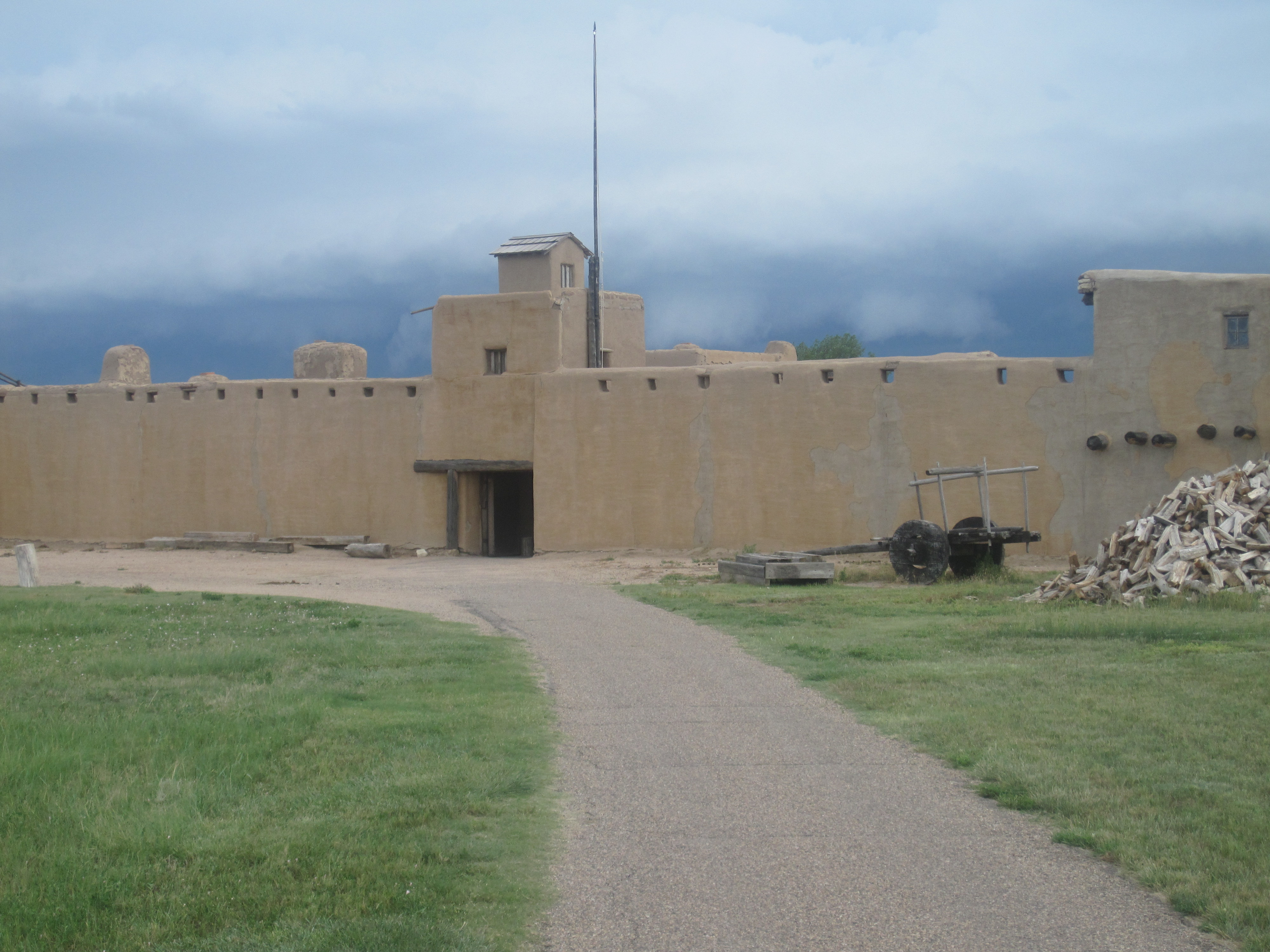
A view from outside Bent's Old Fort (reconstruction)

The fort, and the area immediately outside it, comprised a multi-cultural, multi-lingual center with permanent inhabitants from many nations and visitors. Native tribes in the area for trading, such as the Sioux, Apache and Kiowa, as well as Comanche and Cheyenne also established temporary camps outside the fort. It was the hub of a trading area that encompassed a 500 miles (800 km) radius. It was also a stop each year for hundreds of wagons of European Americans traveling the Santa Fe Trail. Hyde writes in Empires, Nations and Families that

Bent's Fort was the one spot on the Santa Fe trail where exchanges with Indians were welcomed and encouraged, and the effects of those conversations on both sides were far-reaching ... archaeological evidence tells us that people sat in the courtyard together and smoked—a lot". (Note: Archeological surveys have recovered 1526 pipes in the courtyard of the fort alone.)

Bent managed trade to and from the fort: he provided a safe zone in the area and a supply of goods for its store, as well as shipping buffalo robes back to St. Louis for sale. As many as 20,000 Native Americans camped near the fort in the fall for seasonal trading.

European-American travelers sometimes stayed for as long as three weeks at the fort before resuming their journeys. From fall through spring, the fort was busy with people coming to trade, and travelers resting and restocking supplies. The Bents had up to 100 employees, depending on the season, who had a variety of skills: clerks, guards, traders, teamsters, trappers, a tailor, blacksmith, carpenter and herders. Caravans took goods to trade with regional Native American tribes.

The fort was usually relatively empty during the summer months. During that period, Bent often made the six-month round trip on the 500-mile-long (800 km) trail to and from Westport, Missouri (present-day Kansas City) to trade the furs and goods gathered over the previous winter. He would purchase goods to replenish the stocks of the fort for the forthcoming hunting season. Westport Landing was an ideal terminus for the Bents' trade. Located on the Missouri River, it was a port for steamboats that hauled goods eastward to St. Louis. Sometimes five or six steamboats would be unloading goods for the Santa Fe trade at one time; dried buffalo meat, buffalo robes and furs would be loaded onto the boats for the return east. Westport was a boom town until a cholera epidemic in the mid-1840s reduced the town's population by 50%. In 1853 Westport was renamed Kansas City. While Bent and the pack trains were away, the fort managed with a skeleton crew of herders, clerks, traders and laborers for Native Americans and travelers.

William and Charles Bent had brought three slaves from St. Louis to work in their households: the brothers Andrew and Dick Green, and Dick's wife Charlotte, who served as a cook. In 1848 Charlotte Green described herself to George Ruxton as "de only lady in de whole damn Injun country". Her cooking won her a high reputation among the fur traders and travelers. One person called her a "culinary divinity". Bent's Fort held dances regularly; Colonel Henry Inman described Charlotte as "the center of attention, the belle of the evening. She knew her worth and danced accordingly."

In 1846 Bent was given the title of "Colonel" by the United States (US) Army after supplying US troops and guiding them into New Mexico during the Mexican–American War. George and William Bent freed Dick Green for his heroic efforts in an Indian revolt in 1847 at Taos, during which their brother Charles was killed. Green had gone north with American soldiers to defend Bent's Taos home. He bravely led a skirmish against a group of Taos Pueblo and other warriors. Green was severely wounded but survived a trip back to Bent's Fort. Also allowing Charlotte Green to leave with her husband, the Bents gave her an informal freedom.

=== Bent's new fort ===
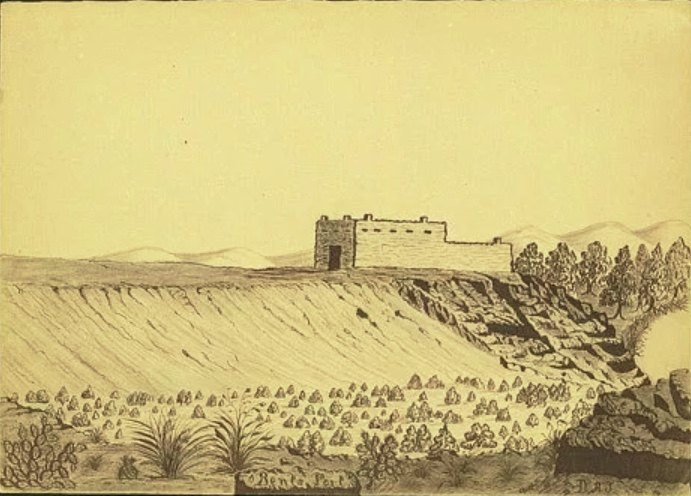
Daniel Jenks traveled to Colorado territory in 1859 in search of gold. While there, he made this sketch of Bent's New Fort, which is one of the earliest known images of the fort." Photo courtesy Library of Congress, Prints and Photographs Dept.

As the demand for furs declined, business dropped at the fort. An 1849 cholera epidemic among the Cheyenne took the lives of half the tribe, including Tall Woman, Bent's mother-in-law.

Bent wanted to build a new fort closer to Big Timbers, near the winter grounds for many tribes. Unable to agree on a selling price for the old fort, after removing his inventory of goods, Bent blew up and set fire to the old fort. In 1853 he established a stone fort in the Big Timbers area. Six years later, the US government purchased the new "Bent's Fort", renamed it Fort Wise and remodeled it for military use.

=== Other forts ===
Bent, Vrain & Company had other forts, including

- Fort Saint Vrain (also called Fort George), built about 1837 near present-day Greeley, Colorado, at the confluence of the South Platte River and St. Vrain Creek. It was the center for trading with the Sioux, Arapaho and Northern Cheyenne. From this point, mail and packages were transported south to Taos.
- Adobe Walls, built in 1848 for trade with the Comanche, Kiowa and Prairie Apache. This was the site in 1864 of Kit Carson's greatest battle.

=== Kansas City, Missouri farm ===
On April 6, 1858 Bent purchased a farm with a small brick house at 1032 West 55th Street in Kansas City, Missouri. While generally living at his home in Missouri in 1859, Bent was an agent to the Cheyenne and Arapaho at Big Timbers. At that time, Bent continued his trading business for new settlers lured by the Colorado gold rush. He also freighted goods for the United States government, which yielded a good profit.

During the American Civil War, Bent's farm was the site of the Battle of Westport in 1864. In 1871, two years after Bent's death, Adaline sold the Westport farm to Seth Ward, a prosperous businessman.

== Marriages and family ==
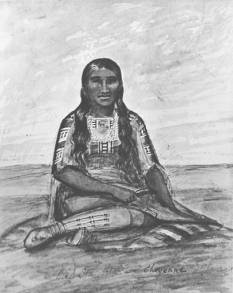
Owl Woman, Cheyenne princess (Mis-stan-stur). Drawing by Lt. James Abert.

In 1835 Bent married Owl Woman (Mis-stan-stur), the oldest daughter of White Thunder and Tail Woman, in a Cheyenne ceremony. Her father was an influential Cheyenne leader and medicine man. He was the tribe's "Keeper of the Arrows," four arrows thought to have a sacred or medicinal role. The prestige of his position as a medicine man meant that his daughters also had high status.

Owl Woman As a part of the marriage ritual, Owl Woman was carried into a lodge which was constructed for them in the Cheyenne village near the fort, while Bent dispensed numerous gifts to her people. Bent later became a "Cheyenne sub-chief", as he was given tribal membership with his marriage to Owl Woman.

The marriage was important for both Bent and Owl Woman's father White Thunder. For Bent, the marriage reinforced his relationship with the Cheyenne. White Thunder believed the marriage would strengthen his alliance with Bent and provide protection for the Cheyenne. On a personal level, it enhanced his prestige within the tribe.

Owl Woman and Bent had the following children, named in English and Cheyenne:

- Mary, named for Bent's favorite sister, was born January 22, 1838. Her Cheyenne name was Ho-ka.
- Robert, named for Bent's youngest brother, was born about 1840–1841. His Cheyenne name was Octavi-wee-his.
- George, was born July 7, 1843, named after Bent's brother. He was also named Ho-my-ike. He fought with the Dog Soldiers band of Cheyenne warriors after surviving the Sand Creek Massacre.
- Julia or Um-ah was born in 1847; she was named in English for Bent's oldest sister, and married the French-Cheyenne merchant, rancher and interpreter Edmund Guerrier, whose father William Guerrier worked for Julia's father William Bent.

As a successful man, Bent followed Cheyenne custom and by 1844 took Owl Woman's two younger sisters, Yellow Woman and Island, as secondary wives. He had another son with Yellow Woman:

- Charles (Charley) was born in 1845. His Cheyenne name was Pe-ki-ree, meaning White Hat. He fought with the Dog Soldiers band of Cheyenne warriors after surviving the Sand Creek Massacre. Charley was described and pictured in the March 1868 edition of Harper's Magazine.

George, Julia, and Charley all survived the Sand Creek Massacre.

Owl Woman died in 1847 or later. In the following six years, life for the family changed dramatically. In 1849 a cholera epidemic swept through the Cheyenne tribe, killing up to half of the people, including the children's maternal grandmother, Tall Woman. After this, Bent destroyed his old fort and built a new stone one at Big Timbers.

Island became the primary caregiver for Owl Woman's children. She did not want to stay in the Bents' new stone fort, nor did she want the children there. In February 1854, she had her lodge moved to just outside the new fort. That winter, William's oldest son George Bent, then age 11, was sent to Kansas City to attend an Episcopal boarding school. In the following years, he was separated from his family for much of the time in order to attend school. Island later left Bent for Joe Baraldo.

In 1864 Yellow Woman also left Bent. She left with their son Charley Bent, then 19, who joined the Dog Soldiers. This group of warriors formed to retaliate for the Sand Creek Massacre that year, when US forces attacked and killed numerous Cheyenne.

Adaline Harvey After Yellow Woman and Island had both left him, Bent married Adaline Harvey, the 20-year-old mixed-race daughter of his friend Alexander Harvey, a fur trader based in Kansas City and a Blackfeet mother. He was then 60 years old. They married on April 4, 1869, in Jackson County, Missouri. Harvey traded in the Upper Missouri region; his company was named Harvey, Primeau & Company.

When the son George Bent met his father's new wife, he recognized Adaline Harvey as having been a student at his school; she was five years younger than he. They had both been assigned Robert Campbell as a guardian while at the boarding school.

The marriage was short, as William died later that year. Pregnant at his death, Adaline Harvey Bent was reported to have had a daughter. Adaline Bent inherited her husband's property in Kansas City in 1869 and sold it in 1871.

=== Family life at Bent's Fort ===
Life at the fort, called the "mud castle of the plains", reflected the heritage of both Owl Woman and Bent. The children's clothes included linen shirts and soft-leather moccasins. They ate on fine china and, according to Cheyenne custom, slept on the ground in soft hides. The furnishings and household goods included items from the United States, Mexico and overseas nations. The children enjoyed pumpkin pie and pancakes made by Charlotte Green, an enslaved cook whose husband was also held by the Bents. Chipita, the French-Mexican wife of a Bent worker, made taffy for the children. She performed housekeeping and laundry services at the fort.

Owl Woman's mother Tall Woman taught the children to be respectful and courteous to their elders. They gave discipline by stern glances and waving fingers. In their multi-cultural environment, the children learned to speak many languages; George learned to speak Cheyenne, English, Spanish, Comanche, Kiowa and Arapaho. The boys learned to ride horses bareback, to hunt and to be warriors. The girls learned to assist in the household, assessing the dryness of wood for gathering, learning to recognize the varieties of berries and other plants, and their uses. Girls were taught to be gracious, generous hosts. Later George Bent recalled of his childhood at the fort:

Something was always going on, and we children had no lack of amusements. In the fall and winter there was always a large camp of Indians just outside the fort – Cheyenne and Arapahos, and sometimes Sioux, Kiowas, Comanches, and Prairie Apaches.

=== Living arrangements ===
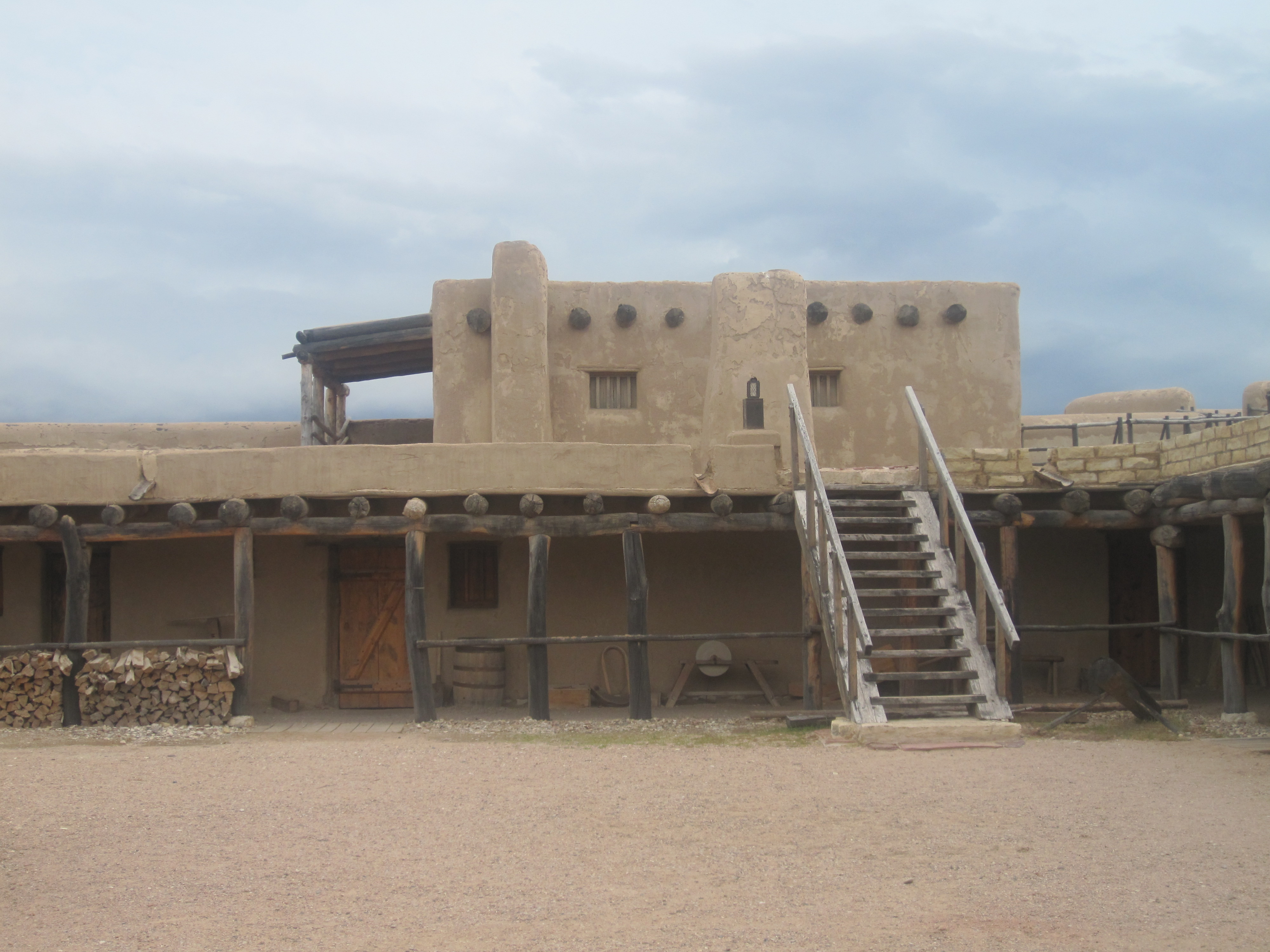
A view inside Bent's Old Fort (reconstruction)

William and his wife Owl Woman had several homes. Where they lived depended on the season, which affected both his travels and the Cheyenne's seasonal movements.

- Bent's Fort – When the family was at the fort, Owl Woman preferred to stay in her lodge in the Cheyenne village. Her room at the fort was dark, loud and smelly, as it was near the blacksmith shop and the courtyard where the horses and pack animals were pastured.
- Cheyenne village – Owl Woman stayed at the lodge near the fort. Built for the couple for their wedding and located in the Cheyenne village, it was quiet and well-lit. It held the sacred, religious and household items of her culture. While Owl Woman was alive, Bent typically left the fort in April for the six-month supply train roundtrip journey to Missouri. During the summer months, he went back and forth between the fort and the nearby Cheyenne village to see his wife and children. By autumn, the family lived within the fort.
- Big Timbers – Seasonally the Cheyenne moved 30 miles (48 km) down the Arkansas River to Big Timbers. (Note: Bent later built a new fort at this site. His original fort was destroyed in 1849, around the time of the Oklahoma cholera epidemic.), where they stayed during the hunting season and the winter. During the Cheyenne's winter visit to Big Timbers, Bent accompanied his family there with goods for trading. At Big Timbers, he lived with his family according to Cheyenne custom.

== Native American relationships and negotiations ==
=== Background ===
In the 1820s, the central plains area was subject to political and economic turmoil resulting from the Mexican War of Independence. The Arkansas River delineated the border, with Mexico to the south and the United States northward. The people looked for new opportunities for trade alliances, in part to replace those that had involved the now-deposed Spanish governors. United States settlers and military forces began to arrive in the area as people were exploring the west.

The Native American tribes of the central and southern plains were also defining or redefining their territories. Tribes moved to new lands within the plains for various reasons: they may have been displaced in their previous land, had internal disputes that caused them to relocate, sought better hunting or gathering grounds, or sought land that supported their way of life. The Comanche, Kiowa, Cheyenne and Arapaho were among the competing tribes. The Cheyenne likely moved into the plains in the 17th and 18th century from Minnesota. By the mid-1800s, they lived with the Arapaho north of the Arkansas River near the site later developed as Bent's Fort in Colorado.

The Comanche came to the grasslands of southern plains for a better life but competed for resources and territory with other tribes. In an agreement reached with the Cheyenne, "The Great Peace of 1840", they agreed to stay south of the Arkansas River and the Cheyenne and Arapaho north of it.

The Comanche invasion of the southern plains was, quite simply, the longest and bloodiest conquering campaign the American West had witnessed - or would witness until the encroachment of the United States a century and a half later.

=== Negotiations ===
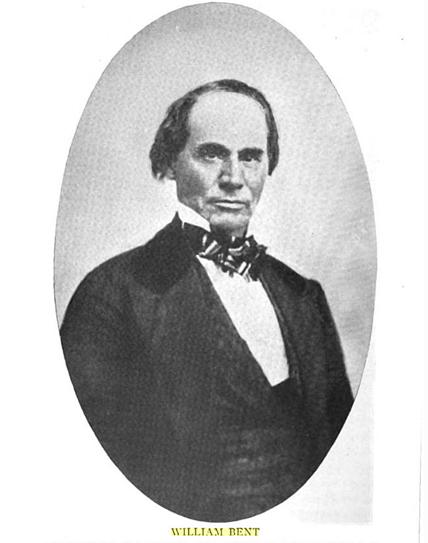
William Bent (1809–1869)

The long-settled and the recently settled tribes had different views of the traders, which exacerbated inter-tribal rivalries. In 1833 White Thunder led the Cheyenne into a fight with the Pawnee; his people lost many warriors, and the Pawnee captured the four sacred arrows. White Thunder and his tribe lost much respect as a result.

During the mid-1830s, the Cheyenne and the Arapaho had become eager to work with the incoming trade caravans, and notably those associated with Bent. They saw the trade caravans as an opportunity for enrichment rather than as a threat. The Cheyenne favored Bent because he had intervened to protect them against Comanche raiders.

Bent worked to negotiate a resolution to the inter-tribal disputes, and to end their raids on settlers and traders. While the truce was uneasy, it enhanced his position. The historian Anne Hyde described the situation as similar to that in northern California, as a "negotiated community. ... Only constant renegotiation and the conscious creation of community through family ties, diplomacy, warfare, and dinner made it operate in a surprisingly stable way."

In contrast, the Comanche had resisted traders and other incursions. They had for many years protected their territory to the south of the Arkansas River against almost all who attempted to move into it. They had built up their power with a deep knowledge of their territory, shrewd trading arrangements, and their willingness to raid those who threatened or breached the arrangements. Their grip on the territory to the south of the river was one of the reasons why Bent's Fort had been constructed to the north. Although the Comanche continued to assert their power after Mexican independence, the influx of displaced tribes, the westward push of European-American settlers, and the development of the Santa Fe Trail generated new conflicts. Raids and battles resulted in many fatalities. The Comanche raided the fort and its surroundings north of the river in 1839, provoking a retaliatory raid by the Cheyenne.

Great Peace of 1840, inter-tribal negotiations

The trading environment improved after 1840, when Bent's Fort became the site of a truce between the Comanche, Apache and Kiowa tribes of the north and the Cheyenne and Arapaho of the south. Hyde describes this as a "network of enormous significance." The tribes negotiated a peace over several weeks during the summer of 1840.

Bent hosted the various camps and their celebrations. Hyde has said that

For William Bent, Owl Woman, and their families and business associates, the Arkansas River as border between Mexico and the United States was an abstraction. However, the Arkansas River as border between the Comanches and the Cheyennes mattered deeply, as did the river as wintering ground for people and for bison. Bent's Fort and its vacinidad created an oasis where business could be conducted and lives led, regardless of imperial borders.

George Ruxton described in 1848 how the council room at the fort was used: "Chiefs of the Shain [sic], Kioway and Araphó sit in solemn conclave with the head traders, and smoke the calumet over their real and imaginary grievances."

Treaty of 1861

Black Kettle, chief of the Southern Cheyenne, wanted peace with the United States. He and other chiefs signed a treaty in 1861 which resulted in his tribes being assigned to a reservation along Sand Creek, although the area was nearly devoid of game. White settlers continued to trespass upon Cheyenne land. Unable to feed their families, some Cheyenne begged for food from settlers; others returned to old hunting grounds. Still others raided settlers and wagon trains for food.

=== Sand Creek Massacre ===
The Pike's Peak gold rush of 1858 led to increasing conflicts. American miners and settlers gradually encroached on Cheyenne lands until fighting broke out in 1864. Black Kettle asked Bent to persuade the Americans to negotiate peace and, briefly, it appeared possible. But, Governor John Evans and Colonel John Chivington (who was planning a run for U.S. Congress) had based their political futures on ending the Native American threat. They had amassed troops from Washington, D.C. When Bent, who had lived among the Cheyenne for 40 years and had half-Cheyenne children, asked for peaceful resolution, Chivington told him it was not possible.

Despite an apparent peace agreement, on November 28, 1864, Chivington and a volunteer army captured Bent's son Robert. They forced him to guide the soldiers to the Cheyenne campsite on the reservation. The US forces killed and mutilated between 200 and 400 Cheyenne in the Sand Creek Massacre. Charles, Julie and George Bent were all inside Black Kettle's village when Chivington and his forces arrived.

George Bent recalled that day:

In the camps ... all was confusion and noise—men, women, and children rushing out of the lodges partly dressed; women and children screaming at the sight of the troops; men running back into the lodges for their arms ... Black Kettle had a large American flag tied to the end of a long lodgepole and ... kept calling out not to be frightened; that the camp was under protection and there was no danger ... White Antelope, when he saw the soldiers shooting into the lodges, made up his mind not to live any longer ... He stood in front of his lodge with his arms folded across his breast, singing the death-song: "Nothing lives long," he sang, "only the earth and the mountains."

Robert Bent said:

After the firing, the warriors put the squaws and children together, and surrounded them to protect them. I saw five squaws under a bank for shelter. When the troops came up to them they ran out and showed their persons to let the soldiers know they were squaws and begged for mercy, but the soldiers shot them all.

All of Bent's grown children survived the massacre. Robert Bent testified in court against Chivington, who had forced him to guide the soldiers to the Cheyenne village. His brothers Charles and George Bent joined the Dog Soldiers band, as did Yellow Woman, who left William Bent to go with her son Charles. The Dog Soldiers led continuing resistance to drive the European Americans from the Cheyenne homeland. Charles Bent was later killed by scouts for the U.S. Army.

Regular Army officers were horrified by the massacre at Sand Creek. Both the Congress and Army investigated, and General Ulysses S. Grant called Chivington's actions murder, but no one was punished. The Committee on the Conduct of the War reported:

As to Colonel Chivington, our committee can hardly find fitting terms to describe his conduct. Wearing the uniform of the United States, which should be the emblem of justice and humanity ... he deliberately planned and executed a foul and dastardly massacre which would have disgraced the veriest savage among those who were the victims of his cruelty.

Most of the Dog Soldiers band was killed by US forces in June 1869 in the Battle of Summit Springs.

George Bent survived and married Magpie, a Cheyenne woman, and had a family. Bilingual, he served as an interpreter beginning in 1865. He moved to the Cheyenne and Arapaho reservation in 1870, where he lived the rest of his life, and worked for the US Indian agent as an interpreter and assistant. In the early twentieth century, he served as a major source or informant for James Mooney and George Bird Grinnell, anthropologists who went to the West to study the Cheyenne and learn about their history and culture. Based on his letters to George E. Hyde, Hyde wrote his biography, which was not published until 1968.

=== Treaty of 1865 ===
On October 14, 1865, the Arapaho and Cheyenne of the Upper Arkansas valley made a treaty with the US government. US representatives included Bent and Kit Carson, who was Special Commissioner. The US apologized to the Arapaho and Cheyenne for the Sand Creek Massacre. Some of the tribe members did not approve of the treaty, which would limit them to a reservation south of the Arkansas River, rather than their traditional territory to the north, which was larger.

As part of the treaty, four of Bent's children, as Cheyenne, were each awarded 640 acres land on a reservation south of the Arkansas River, between Red Creek and Buffalo Creek:

- Mary Bent Moore and her three children: Adia Moore, William Bent Moore and George Moore
- George Bent
- Charles Bent (He was later killed by US Indian scouts; in 1869 most of the Dog Soldiers band was killed during the Battle of Summit Springs by Pawnee scouts and US forces.)
- Julia Bent

William Bent assisted in the negotiation of the treaty with the Kiowa and Comanche on October 18, 1865.

== Later years ==
=== Las Animas, Colorado ranch ===
In 1869, following his marriage to Adaline Harvey, Bent moved with her to his ranch in Las Animas, Colorado, on the Purgatoire River, south of the Arkansas River. (Note: Source above for the year is the 1869 marriage record, from official records.) From there he managed his freighting business.

=== Death ===
While on a supply trip from Colorado to Missouri in 1869, Bent stopped off to see his daughter Mary and son-in-law, R. M. Moore, a judge. They had built a house on his ranch land in Kansas City. Contracting pneumonia, Bent died on May 19, 1869. He is interred at the Las Animas Cemetery south of Las Animas, Colorado.

Adaline Harvey Bent gave birth to their daughter, after his death. She lived most of her life in Colorado, where she died February 26, 1905, at the Pueblo Women's Hospital.

== Legacy and honors ==
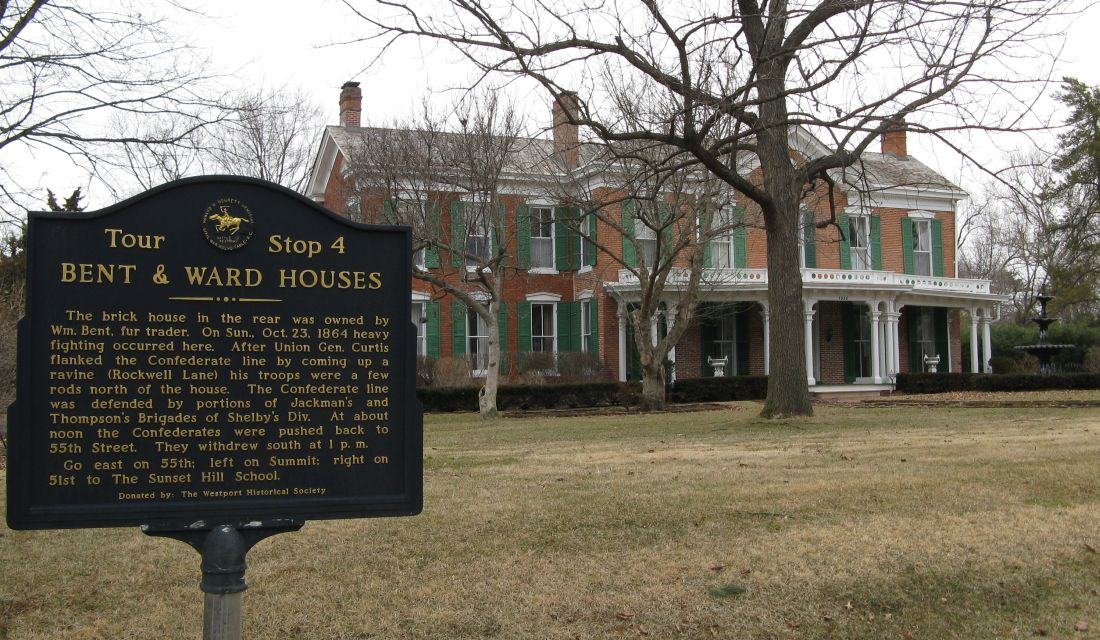
Seth Ward house in Westport, Missouri, on former Bent property; historic marker notes "Bent and Ward Houses"

- The William Bent house in Westport/Kansas City was preserved as an outbuilding after Seth Ward built a large brick mansion on the property. The property (and houses) is now part of the Country Club District of Kansas City. Much of the former farm's grazing land was taken by the city to create Loose Park. In the twentieth century, both the houses were listed on the National Register of Historic Places. The site is marked as the "Bent and Ward Houses".
- Bent's Old Fort has been reconstructed by the National Park Service in the 1970s and is operated as an historic destination, with events to interpret its history.
- Scott Brady, known for his syndicated western television series Shotgun Slade portrayed William Bent in a 1957 episode, "The Lone Woman" of the CBS anthology series, Playhouse 90. Raymond Burr, known for his long-running Perry Mason series, played Charles Bent in the same episode.
- Ronald Reagan was cast as Bent in the 1965 episode, "No Place for a Lady", on the syndicated anthology series, Death Valley Days, which he also hosted. Linda Marsh portrayed the historical Susan Shelby Magoffin, the first woman to travel the Santa Fe Trail. Simon Scott played Magoffin's husband, Samuel.

== Sources ==
- Brown, Dee. (1971). Bury My Heart at Wounded Knee, Holt, Rinehart & Wilson. ISBN 0-03-085322-2.
- Deverell, William Francis (2004), A Companion to the American West, Malden, MA: Blackwell Publishing. ISBN 0-631-21357-0.
- Grinnell, George Bird (1913). Beyond the Old Frontier, Charles Scribner's Sons, online text at Archive.
- Grinnell, George Bird (1923). Bent's Old Fort And Its Builders, (Kansas State Historical Collections, vol. 15). Kansas Historical Society.
- Halaas, David Fridtjof; Masich, Andrew Edward (2004). Halfbreed: The Remarkable True Story of George Bent, Da Capo Press. ISBN 0-306-81320-3.
- Hämäläinen, Pekka. (2008). The Comanche Empire. Yale University Press. ISBN 978-0-300-12654-9.
- Hoig, Stan (1961). The Sand Creek Massacre. Norman: University of Oklahoma Press. p. 15. ISBN 0-8061-1147-X.
- Hyde, Anne F. (2004). "Transients and Stickers: The Problem of Community in the Wild West", in A Companion to the American West, Edited: Deverell, William Francis. Wiley-Blackwell. ISBN 978-0-631-21357-4.
- Hyde, Anne F. (2011). Empires, Nations, and Families: A History of the North American West, 1800–1860, University of Nebraska Press. ISBN 978-0-8032-2405-6.
- Indian Affairs: Laws and Treaties. 2:681. Government Printing Office. 1903.
- Lavender, David. (1972) [1954]. Bent's Fort. Lincoln: University of Nebraska Press and Bison Books. ISBN 0-8032-5753-8.
- Marker, Sherry (2003), Plains Indian Wars, Facts On File, ISBN 0-8160-4931-9
- "Bent’s Old Fort National Historic Site – A Self-Guiding Tour", National Park Service, U.S. Department of the Interior. Summer 2002.
- Ruxton, George Frederick (October 1848), "Life in the 'Far West', Part V". Blackwood's Edinburgh Magazine, volume 64, issue CCCXCVI. Retrieved July 3, 2011
- Sabin, Edwin Legrand. (1914). Kit Carson days (1809–1868). Chicago: A.C. McClurg & Company.
- Schroeder, Marshall. (1998) [1986]. Missouri: The WPA Guide to the "Show Me" State, St. Louis: Missouri Historical Society Press. ISBN 1-883982-23-5.
- Simmons, Marc. (2005). New Mexico Mavericks: Stories from a Fabled Past, Santa Fe: Sunstone Press. ISBN 0-86534-500-7.
- Varnell, Jeanne (1999). Women of Consequence: The Colorado Women's Hall of Fame, Boulder: Johnson Press. ISBN 1-55566-214-5.
- Who is the Savage?, PBS: The West Film Project. 2001. Retrieved 2011-07-13.
