= Silas Bent (judge) =

American judge

Silas Bent Jr.

Judge of the Missouri Supreme Court
- In office 1817–1821

Personal details
- Born: April 4, 1768 Rutland, Province of Massachusetts Bay
- Died: November 20, 1827 (aged 59) St. Louis, Missouri, U.S.
- Spouse: Martha Kerr
- Children: 8, including Charles, William, and Silas III
- Relatives: Owl Woman (daughter-in-law); George Bent (grandson); Lilburn Boggs (son-in-law); Silas Bent IV (grandson); Henry C. Boggs (grandson); Charles Marion Russell (grandson); James Kerr (brother-in-law)

Silas Bent Jr. (April 4, 1768 – November 20, 1827) was an American land surveyor, attorney, and jurist who served as a Judge of the Missouri Supreme Court from 1817 to 1821. His son, Charles Bent, was a fur trader and appointed as the first territorial governor of New Mexico during the United States invasion of Mexico in the Mexican-American War. Three of his other sons William, George, and Robert had been in business with Charles and built Bent's Old Fort and other outposts of trade in the American Southwest.

== Early life ==
Silas Bent was born in Rutland, Massachusetts, on April 4, 1768, (Note: Allen states that Bent was born May 16, 1768.) one of twelve children, to Silas Bent (1744–1818) and Mary Carter (1747–1831). Bent was a descendant of John Bent (1596–1672) a founder of Sudbury, Massachusetts. His father, also called Silas, may have been involved in the Boston Tea Party (there are differing opinions) and became a lieutenant colonel in the Massachusetts militia.

Bent studied law in Wheeling, West Virginia, under Philip Doddridge from the late-1780s. Upon marrying one of Doddridge's cousins, Martha Kerr, some time prior to 1800, he and his wife relocated to Charleston, West Virginia, where three of their children were born: Charles, Juliannah (also known as Julie Ann) and John.

Bent's wife Martha had two sisters and two brothers (including James Kerr, who served in the Missouri House of Representatives and Missouri State Senate and later led colonization, military, and political matters in Texas).

== Career ==
=== Postmaster ===
Bent spent brief periods running a store, serving as postmaster of the courthouse in Brooke County, Virginia, and sitting as a judge in the court of common pleas.

=== Surveyor ===
After the American Revolutionary War, the new nation claimed ownership over Northwest Territory land. To encourage white settlement, fund paying off debts incurred during the war, and to apportion rewards for veterans, the United States sold parts of the land to private land speculation companies who facilitated settler colonialism in the territory.

Bent moved his family to Washington County, Ohio, where he was appointed deputy surveyor in 1803 to Rufus Putnam, surveyor-general and former founder of the Ohio Company of Associates land company.

Bent's father (Silas Sr.) had held one share in the Ohio Company of Associates after serving with Putnam in the American Revolutionary War. Silas Sr., Putnam, and several other veterans founded the town of Marietta in the Ohio Country.

The Bents' first daughter Lucy was born in 1805.

In July, 1805, Bent became deputy surveyor under Jared Mansfield, surveyor-general of the Louisiana Purchase. Mansfield had lived alongside the Bents and Putnam in Marietta, Ohio from 1803 to 1805.

In July 1806, Secretary of the Treasury Albert Gallatin named Bent principal deputy surveyor of Louisiana Territory (acquired Missouri as part of the Louisiana Purchase in 1803). He settled with his family in St. Louis on September 17 of that year.

=== Judgeships ===
Bent became the first presiding judge of the St. Louis district court of common pleas on August 20, 1807; presiding judge on the St. Louis court of common pleas on November 9, 1809; and auditor of public accounts.

On January 26, 1813, Shadrach Bond, Edward Hempstead, and John B. C. Lucas wrote a letter to President James Madison recommending Silas Bent to fill an open judge position on the Supreme Court of the Territory of Missouri. This vacancy was left by John Coburn's resignation.

This recommendation came from powerful men in the area. Bond was a delegate to the U.S. House of Representatives from the Illinois Territory's at-large district. Hempstead was a delegate to the U.S. House of Representatives from the Missouri Territory's at-large district. Lucas was a former member of the Pennsylvania House of Representatives and judge of the Court of Common Pleas. He was also a former district judge and commissioner of land claims for the District of Louisiana (which became Missouri Territory in 1812).

President Madison nominated Bent for the judgeship on February 16, 1813 and he was approved by Congress and appointed on February 21, 1813, as a member of the bench of the Missouri Supreme Court. He served in this role until 1821 when Missouri became a state (although he had been nominated to the Missouri Supreme Court by first Governor Alexander McNair).

==== First execution by hanging in St. Louis ====
Bent served on the court for the trial that led to the first execution by hanging in St. Louis. It was a murder case alleging that John Young killed his step-father George Gordon. Young was convicted and sentenced to death by hanging. Young was hanged to death on September 16, 1809, despite the fact that one of the jurors could not understand or speak English.

=== Later career ===
From 1821 until the year of his death, Bent was a clerk at the St. Louis County Court.

== Residence in St. Louis ==
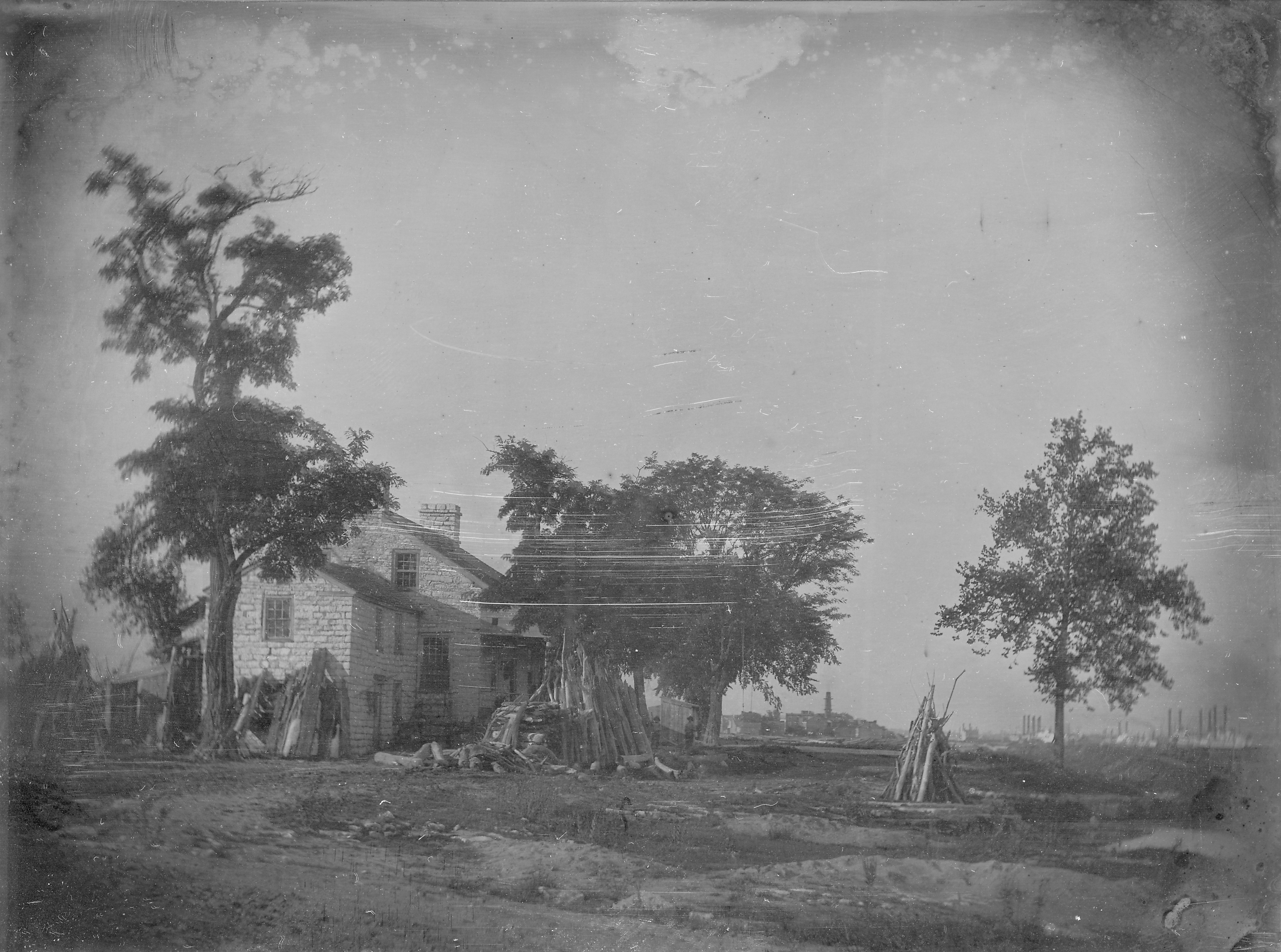
Judge Silas Bent Residence, view from South with St. Louis in distance

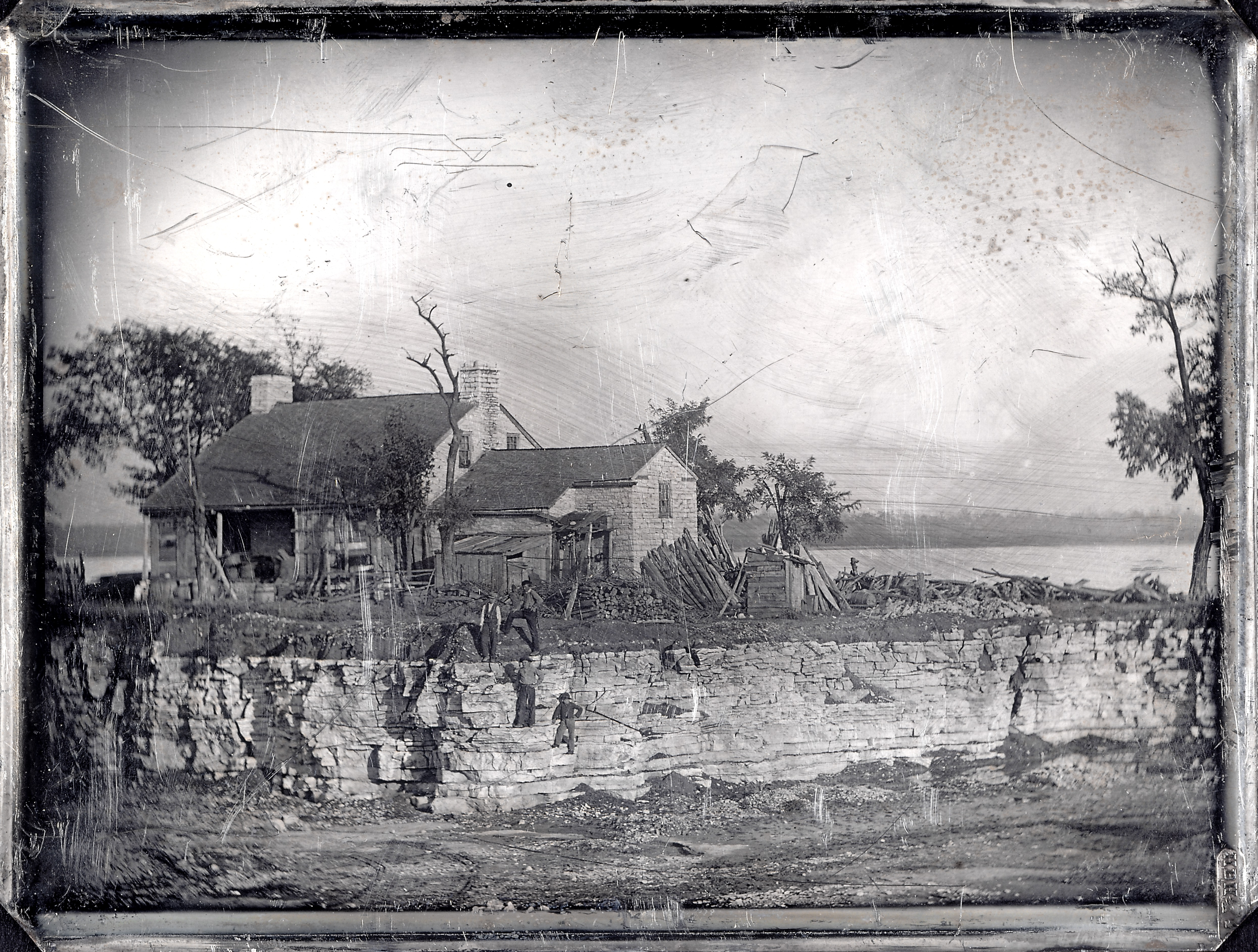
Judge Silas Bent Residence

Bent had a stone house and water mill built in 1807 on the river bank in Carondelet, St. Louis. The home sat on the site of a former village of the Peoria tribe.

== Family ==
Four of Bent's sons entered the lucrative fur trade. Charles, born November 11, 1799, in Charleston, West Virginia, was the first to enter the trapping and trade business. George Bent recounted that his uncle worked about 1816 in the Upper Mississippi region for the American Fur Company. The historian David Lavender wrote that about 1817, Charles worked for the Missouri Fur Company. After establishing his own trading business with Ceran St. Vrain in 1832, Charles Bent was appointed as the first territorial governor of New Mexico in 1846 during the U.S. invasion of Mexico in the Mexican-American War.

William, born May 23, 1809, in St. Louis, entered the fur trade with his brother as a youth, about 1823 or 1824, beginning with learning to trap. At that time in the United States, boys of that age typically started a trade or career. About 1832 Charles and William took as their partner Ceran St. Vrain. George and Robert, born in St. Louis, joined in their brothers' enterprise. William Bent married a Cheyenne woman, Owl Woman. Their son George Bent, became an important informant of Cheyenne history and traditions, as well as serving as a soldier during the American Civil War and as a Cheyenne warrior.

Juliannah (also known as Julie Ann), born in Charleston, West Virginia, became the first wife of Lilburn Boggs, who later became governor of Missouri; she died in 1820. John, born in Charleston, West Virginia, became a distinguished lawyer in St. Louis. Lucy was born in 1805 in Ohio.

Four more children were born in St. Louis; Silas junior served in the Navy. He was a flag Lieutenant on the expedition to Japan under Matthew C. Perry. Later, he was appointed to the St. Louis Board of Police Commissioners. Edward died at age six. Dorcas married judge William C. Carr. Mary married Major Jonathan L. Bean

== Death ==
Bent died in St. Louis on November 20, 1827, having become a wealthy man. His financial legacy enabled Charles and William to embark on the venture that built Bent's Old Fort.
