= Owl Woman =

Cheyenne woman (d. 1847)

- Méstaa'ėhéhe
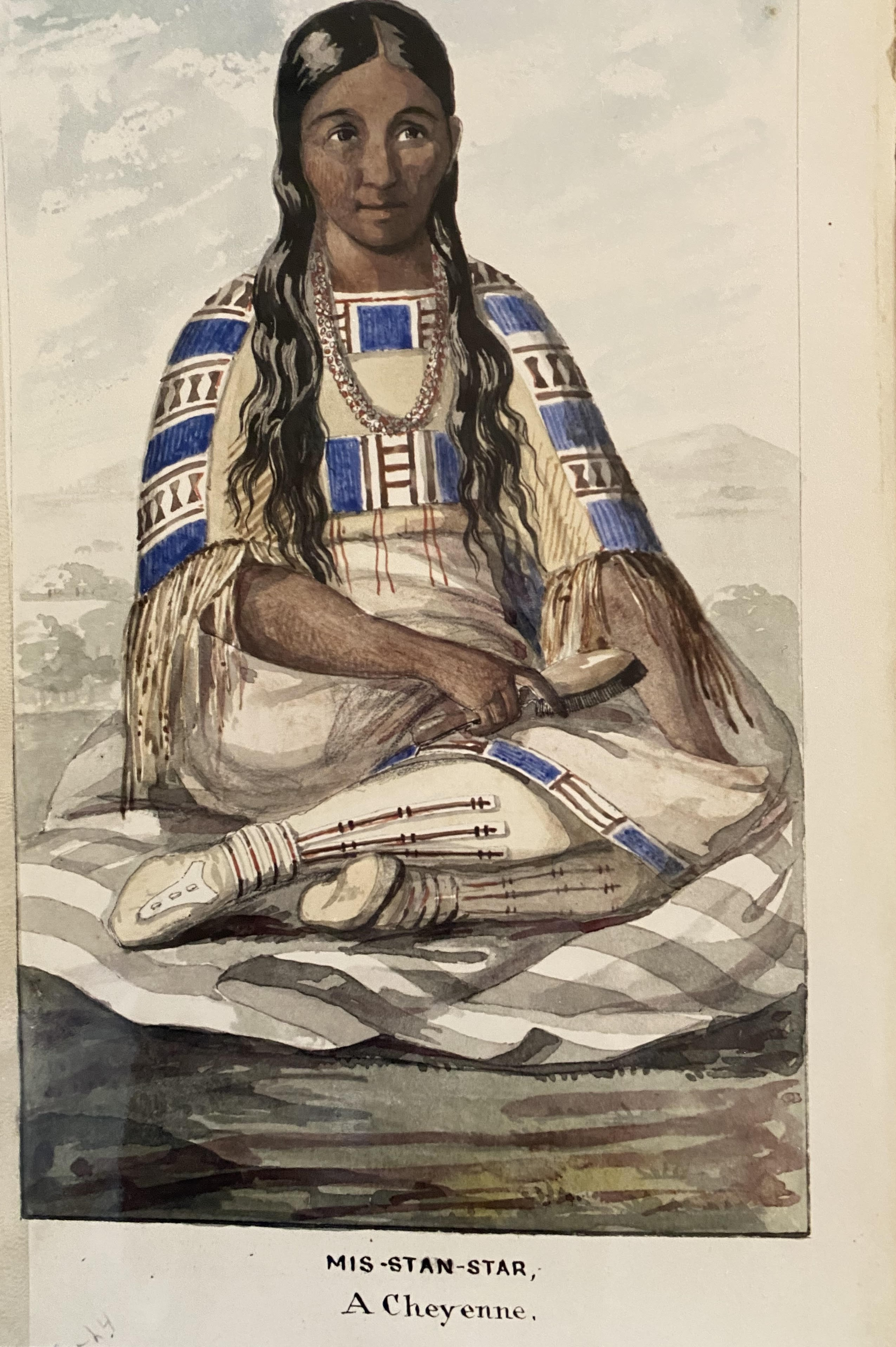
- Drawing of Owl Woman (Mis-stan-stur) by Lt. James Abert
- Died: 1847
- Other name: Cheyenne name: Mis-stan-stur
- Citizenship: Cheyenne
- Spouse: William Bent
- Children: Mary (Cheyenne: Ho-ka) (daughter); Robert (Octavi-wee-his); George (Ho-my-ike); Julia (Um-ah)
- Parents: White Thunder (father); Tail Woman (mother)
- Relatives: Yellow Woman (sister); Island (sister); Charles Bent (brother-in-law); Silas Bent III (brother-in-law); Silas Bent (father-in-law); Edmund Guerrier (son-in-law); Silas Bent IV (nephew)

Owl Woman (Cheyenne: Méstaa'ėhéhe, also transcribed Mis-stan-stur; died 1847) was a Cheyenne woman, a daughter of White Thunder (and Tall Woman), (Note: White Thunder's name can also be translated as Gray Thunder and Painted Thunder.) a well-respected medicine man of the Cheyenne tribe. She was married to an Anglo-American trader named William Bent, with whom she had four children. Owl Woman was inducted into the Colorado Women's Hall of Fame for her role in managing relations between Native American tribes and the Anglo-American men.

== Background ==
=== Native American tribes of the central plains ===
In the 1820s, the central plains area in which several Native American tribes lived had been subject to political and economic turmoil resulting from the Mexican War of Independence. The Arkansas River delineated the border, with Mexico to the south and the United States northwards. There were many opportunities for trade alliances, in part to replace those that had involved the now-deposed Spanish governors, and there was also encroachment on the area by the United States as that nation pursued its policy of manifest destiny.

The area was also subject to turmoil as Native American plains tribes of the central and southern plains sought to define or redefine their territory. Tribes moved to new lands within the plains for various reasons: they may have been displaced in their previous land, had internal disputes that caused them to relocate, sought better hunting or gathering grounds, or sought land that was most conducive to their way of life. The Comanche, Kiowa, Cheyenne and Arapahoe were among the disputing tribes. The Cheyenne likely moved into the plains in the 17th and 18th century from Minnesota and by the mid-1800s lived with the Arapaho north of the Arkansas River in land near Bent's Fort in Colorado.

Like other Native American tribes, the Comanche came to the grasslands of southern plains for a better life which put them at odds with other tribes. In an agreement reached with the Cheyenne, "The Great Peace of 1840", they agreed to stay south of the Arkansas River and the Cheyenne and Arapaho above it.

The Comanche invasion of the southern plains was, quite simply, the longest and bloodiest conquering campaign the American West had witnessed - or would witness until the encroachment of the United States a century and a half later.

=== William Bent and the Santa Fe trail ===
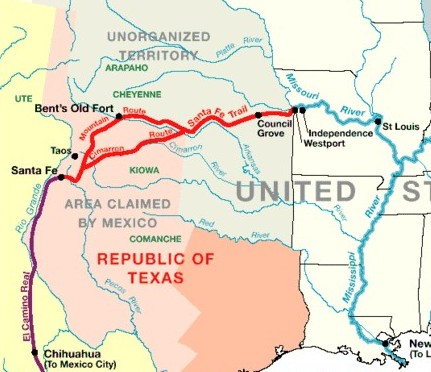
1845 Santa Fe Trail and native tribal lands

William Bent, a white trader from St Louis, came to the Arkansas River region towards the end of the 1820s. By around 1832, although possibly as late as 1834, a permanent trading post called Bent's Fort, which was a substantial adobe construction capable of accommodating 200 people, had been built on the northern "Mountain Route" of the Santa Fe Trail and was open for business. The location of this building was determined after discussions with the Cheyenne and was not far from La Junta, near to land occupied by the Cheyenne and Arapahoe tribes. It became an important center of trade, principally in buffalo robes but also in numerous other goods, including horses and mules. The fort was operated in partnership with his brother, Charles, and Ceran St Vrain, a fur trader who had already established significant trading contacts in New Mexico. (Note: Varnell states that another brother, George, was also a partner at some point.) Sometimes referred to as Fort William, it was in "the perfect place at the perfect time" for someone looking to make money from trading and, for example, a gallon of brandy bought in St Louis for US$2 could be sold at the fort for US$25.

Hyde has dated the moment that White Thunder realized a common interest with Bent. In November 1833 they talked together as a meteor shower lit up the sky over the plains. Many Cheyenne who were gathered with them believed that this celestial event was a signal of the end of the world and it was subsequently referred to as "the Night the Stars Fell". White Thunder saw it as a new beginning and sought both a truce with the Pawnees and the return of the Sacred Arrows of the Cheyenne which had been captured by the Pawnee during a battle. Partially successful, he returned from his solo, unarmed visit to the Pawnee village with two of the arrows and an agreement for peace. He also realized that a formal marital alliance with Bent, and in particular the children that would result from such a relationship, would represent another element of the new beginning, of peace for the Cheyenne and indeed the region.

Bent had already learned the language of the Cheyenne and he was known as Little White Man by the native tribes. He and his brothers had been given native names upon their first meeting with Cheyenne in the area, which had been a convivial occasion during which their respect for the Cheyenne protocols had set a firm base for their future development of the fort and trading.

=== Life at Bent Fort and the Cheyenne village ===
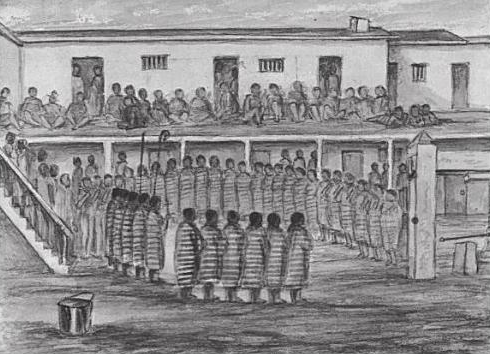
Bent's Fort in 1848

The fort and the area immediately outside it was a multi-cultural, multilingual center with permanent inhabitants from many nations and also visitors, including the temporary camps of native tribes such as the Sioux, Apache and Kiowa, as well as Comanche and Cheyenne. It was the hub of a trading area that encompassed a 500-mile radius and was visited each year by hundreds of wagons traveling the Santa Fe Trail. Hyde writes in Empires, Nations and Families that "Bent's Fort was the one spot on the Santa Fe trail where exchanges with Indians were welcomed and encouraged, and the effects of those conversations on both sides were far-reaching ... archeological evidence tells us that people sat in the courtyard together and smoked—a lot". (Note: Archeological surveys have recovered 1526 pipes in the courtyard of the fort alone.) Bent managed trade to and from the fort: he provided a safe zone in the area and a supply of goods for its store, as well as facilitating the movement of buffalo robes back to St. Louis for sale.

Sitting on the Santa Fe Trail, Bent's Fort was a resting stop for travelers, some staying as much as three weeks. From fall through spring the fort was busy with people wishing to trade and travelers to rest and restock their supplies. Visitors and employees included: Mexicans, Native Americans, and European travelers and trappers. There were also three African American slaves owned by the Bents. Up to 100 employees needed to support the fort and trade included: clerks, guards, traders, teamsters, trappers, a tailor, blacksmith, carpenter and herders. Caravans took goods to trade with regional Native American tribes.

The fort was usually relatively empty during the summer months and during that period Bent would often be riding the six-month journey on the 500-mile-long (800 km) trail to and from Westport, Missouri in order to trade the goods gathered over the previous winter and replenish the stocks of the fort for the forthcoming hunting season. While Bent and the trains were away the fort managed with a skeleton crew of herders, clerks, traders and laborers for Native Americans and travelers.

William and Charles owned African slaves Andrew and Dick Green and brought them from Missouri to assist in the running of the fort. Dick Green's wife, Charlotte, a negro cook who described herself as the only female American woman (Note: Although Simmons provides the "Green" surname for the men, there is conjecture as to whether this was in fact their surname.) to George Ruxton at the time of his visit in 1848 as "de only lady in de whole damn Injun country". She was renowned for her cooking among fur traders and travelers. One person called her a "culinary divinity". Bent's Fort held dances regularly; Charlotte was described by Colonel Henry Inman as "the center of attention, the belle of the evening. She knew her worth and danced accordingly." Dick was released from slavery by George and William Bent after his heroic efforts in a battle in 1847 at Taos after the death of Charles Bent. Dick, who has been stationed with Charles Bent in Santa Fe, made his way north with American soldiers to Bent's Taos home. He bravely led a skirmish against a group of Taos Pueblo and other people. Dick was severely wounded but survived a trip back to Bent's fort. Charlotte, who Simmons claims was also Charles and William's slave, left the fort with her husband.

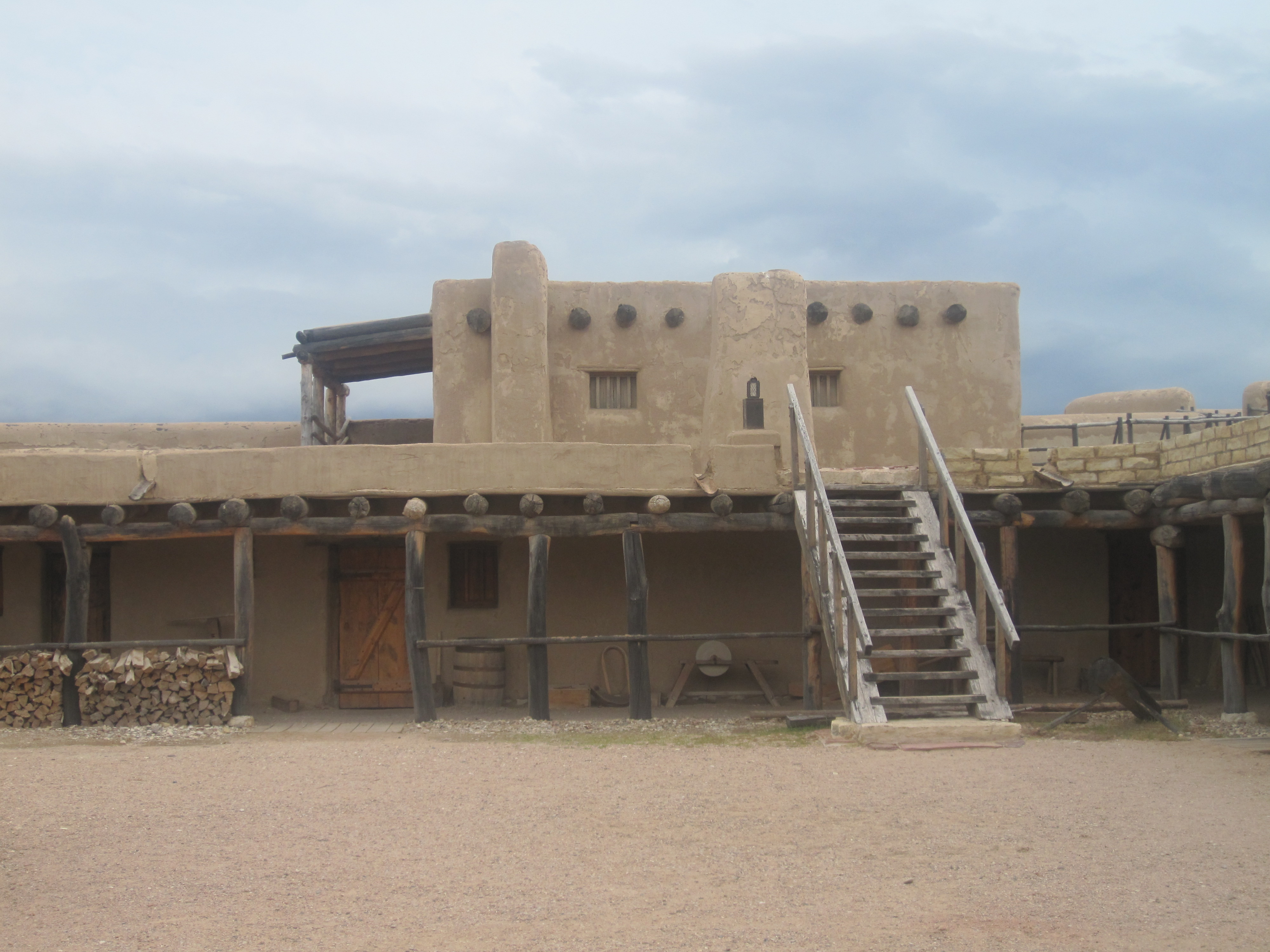
A view inside Bent's Old Fort

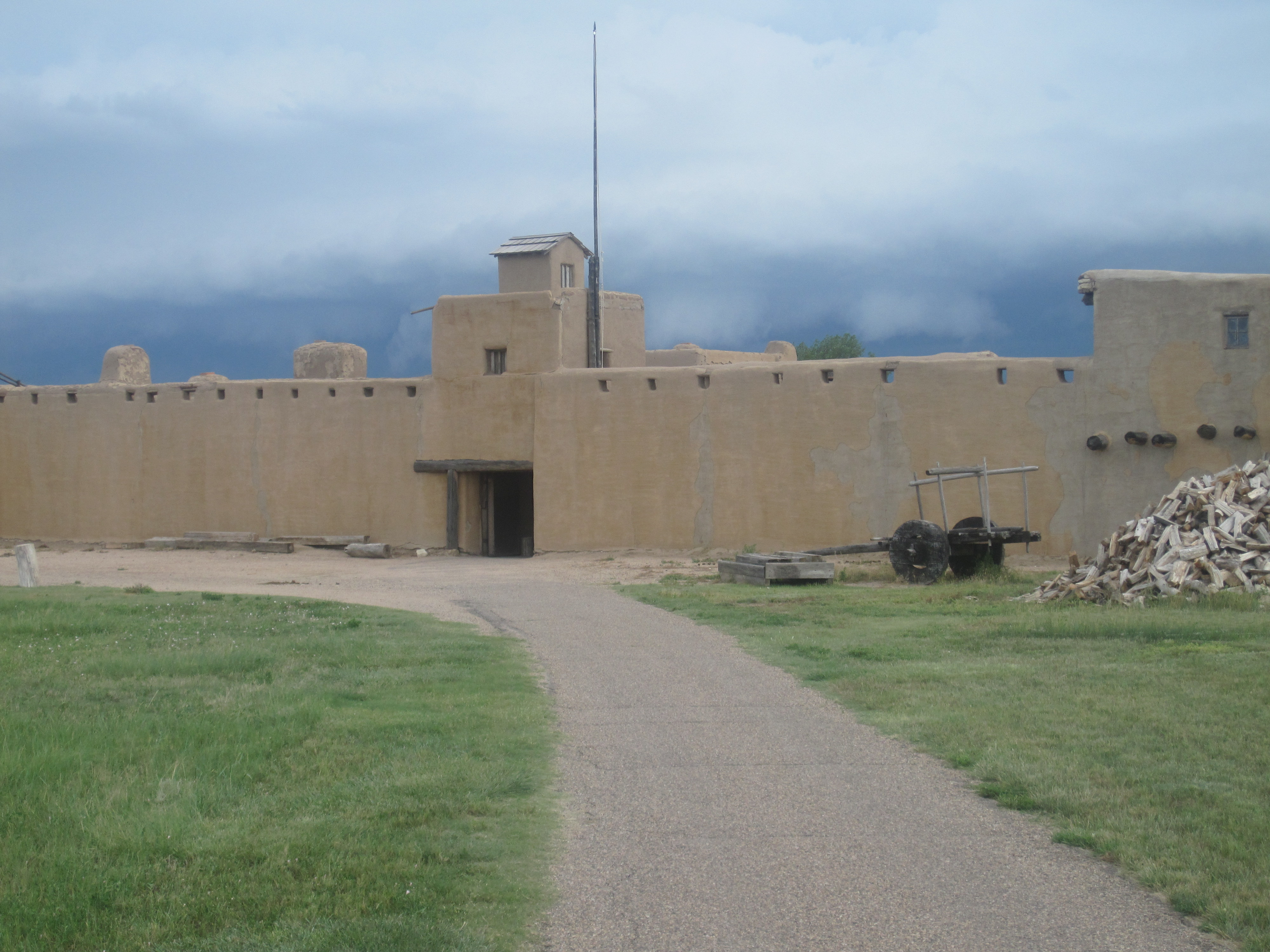
A view outside Bent's Old Fort

=== Bent's Fort role in negotiating tribal relationships ===
In the period immediately prior to the marriage of Owl Woman to Bent both the Cheyenne and the Arapahoe had become eager to work with the incoming trade caravans, and notably those associated with Bent. Unlike many other tribes in the area, they saw these caravans as an opportunity for enrichment rather than as a threat. The Cheyenne in particular had reason to favor Bent because he had on one occasion intervened to protect them against Comanche raiders. However, the disparity in how the long-settled and the recently settled tribes viewed the influx of new traders exacerbated intertribal rivalries and resulted in White Thunder making a decision that was calamitous for both his tribe and his reputation. In 1833 he led the Cheyenne into a fight with the Pawnees, the outcome of which was not merely a considerable loss of life but also the loss of the four arrows. This symbolic capture by the Pawnees represented a huge loss of respect and status for White Thunder and his tribe.

Bent had been doing much to negotiate a resolution to the intertribal disputes, as well as raids on settlers and traders. An uneasy truce had developed which, in its turn, had enhanced his own status and trading position. Anne Hyde has described the overall situation that came to exist in the area as being similar to that prevailing in northern California, a "negotiated community ... Only constant renegotiation and the conscious creation of community through family ties, diplomacy, warfare, and dinner made it operate in a surprisingly stable way."

The trading environment improved after 1840, when Bent's Fort became the site of a truce between the Comanche, Apache and Kiowa tribes on the one hand and the Cheyenne and Arapahoe on the other, creating what Hyde describes as "network of enormous significance." The Comanche, in particular, had for many years protected their territory to the south of the Arkansas River against almost all who attempted to move into it. They had built up their power with a deep knowledge of their territory, shrewd trading arrangements, and their willingness to indulge in raids against those who threatened or breached those arrangements. Indeed, their grip on the territory to the south of the river was one of the reasons why Bent's Fort had been constructed on the opposite side. Although they had continued to assert their power after Mexican independence, the influx of displaced tribes from elsewhere, the westward push of white settlers and the development of the Santa Fe Trail meant that there were many bloody battles and much loss of life. These culminated in a Comanche raid on the fort and its surroundings in 1839 and a retaliatory raid by the Cheyenne. Realizing that long-term peace was preferable to reciprocating attacks, this was agreed and the formalization of the arrangement at the fort over several weeks during the summer of 1840 saw Bent playing a central role as host to the various camps and their celebrations. Hyde has said that

For William Bent, Owl Woman, and their families and business associates, the Arkansas River as border between Mexico and the United States was an abstraction. However, the Arkansas River as border between the Comanches and the Cheyennes mattered deeply, as did the river as wintering ground for people and for bison. Bent's Fort and its vacinidad created an oasis where business could be conducted and lives led, regardless of imperial borders.

George Ruxton subsequently observed, in 1848, how the council room at the fort was used, "Chiefs of the Shain, Kioway and Araphó sit in solemn conclave with the head traders, and smoke the "calumet" over their real and imaginary grievances."

== Biography ==
Owl Woman, whose date of birth is unrecorded, was the oldest daughter of White Thunder and Tail Woman. She had at least two younger sisters, Yellow Woman and Island. Her father was an influential Cheyenne leader who acted as the tribe's "Keeper of the Arrows," four arrows thought to have a sacred or medicinal role. The prestige of his position as a spiritual leader or medicine man was reflected on to his daughters.

The Cheyenne were a nomadic plains tribe who followed and hunted buffalo. They were described as "tall, well built with even features" and regarded as "honorable, intelligent, honest and clean".

=== Marriage ===
It was not uncommon at this time for white men living in the area, usually working as traders or trappers, to take a Native American wife. Often these relationships lasted only until the men left the frontier territory, but while they existed they were of mutual benefit. Bent and Owl Woman's relationship, however, was a partnership that ultimately "resulted in children, wealth and power." From Bent's point of view, marriage to a Cheyenne would not merely provide him with female companionship and a social escort for functions held at the fort but, perhaps more importantly, reinforce an alliance with the tribe that would be a useful adjunct to his burgeoning trading activities. From the perspective of White Thunder, it would bolster his tribe's already friendly relationship with Bent and thus provide protection for them, and on a more personal level it would re-establish some of his prestige within the tribe itself.

To observe the formal rituals of the Cheyenne, he obtained consent from White Thunder to court Owl Woman. So much as talking to a Cheyenne girl was considered to be courtship by the tribe and, as such, it was necessary to obtain the permission first in order not to cause offence. There were other pre-courtship rituals, such as an exchange of ponies between the two men, and during the courtship itself Bent and Owl Woman were always chaperoned by Yellow Woman, in accordance with the Cheyenne belief in remaining celibate until marriage. To signal Bent's request to marry Owl Woman, he arrived at White Thunder's camp with horses and gifts and smoked a peace pipe of tobacco with Owl Woman's father in a ritualistic ceremony. Although Owl Woman wanted to marry Bent, the decision for the couple to marry was made by White Thunder by joining William Bent's hands with Owl Woman's hands. This signified both the acceptance of Owl Woman as William Bent's wife, but also an agreement for William Bent to also accept Owl Woman's sister Yellow Woman. (Note: The arrangement for Yellow Woman to accompany her sister Owl Woman into the marriage with Bent was a custom to share the work of managing a family, processing buffalo hides, meal preparation and possibly other wifely duties.)

The couple married in a Cheyenne ceremony in 1835, per Britney Nelson of the Colorado Historical Society, or as others claim by 1837. As a part of the ritual, Owl Woman was carried into a lodge which was constructed for them in the Cheyenne village near the fort, while Bent dispensed largesse in the form of numerous gifts. Bent later became a "Cheyenne sub-chief", having attained tribal membership with his marriage to Owl Woman. (Note: Varnell believes that Bent "gradually accepted ... Yellow Woman as his wife" who gave birth to Bent's son named Charles in 1845. Dexter stated that: Bent "welcomed her as an honored member of the family, promising to always provide for her, but making it clear he would only have one wife, and that was Owl Woman." She states that Bent took Yellow Woman as his wife after Owl Woman's death. Grinnell similarly believes that this marriage was after the death. Hyde believes that Bent married another sister of Owl Woman, Island.)

=== Living arrangements ===
Bent's Fort and the Cheyenne village

The couple each spent time at their partner's residence: the lodge created for Owl Woman and Bent's quarters within the fort, which were furnished according to their backgrounds. Owl Woman did not prefer to stay the fort, where her room was dark and near the loud, smoky blacksmith shop. The horses and pack animals were also loud and smelly. On the other hand, her lodge was quiet and lit through the parchment-like paper of the roof. Horses grazed on the hills. In the lodge built for Owl Woman and Bent, a shrine-like area held sacred and religious items. Supplies were stowed away, including cooking utensils, food, clothing, bedding, riding gear and weapons.

By the 1840s two of Owl Woman's younger sisters, Island and Yellow Woman, joined them, in accordance with tribal custom for successful men. In 1845 Yellow Woman bore William a boy named Charley, or Pe-ki-ree meaning White Hat in Cheyenne.

In April Bent left the fort for the six-month supply train journey to Missouri. During the summer months his family went back and forth between the fort and the nearby Cheyenne village and were in the fort by autumn.

Big Timbers

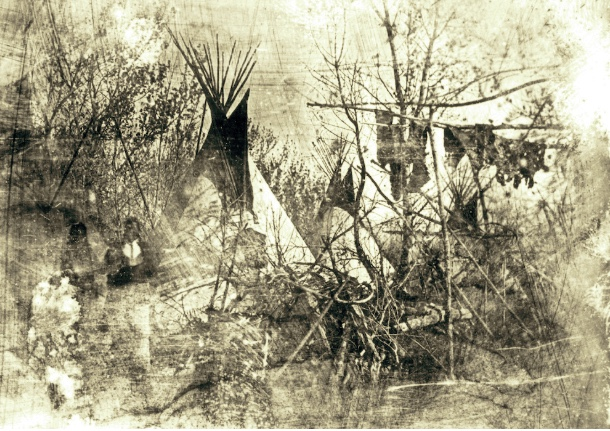
The only surviving daguerreotype from Solomon Nunes Carvalho's journey West in 1853 depicts a view of the Cheyenne village at Big Timbers. A pair of figures stand to the left; drying hides hang on the right. Courtesy of Library of Congress.

Seasonally the Cheyenne moved 30 miles (48 km) down the Arkansas River to Big Timbers. (Note: Big Timbers later became the site of Bent's New Fort, built to replace the original after it was destroyed in mysterious circumstances in 1849 around the time of the Oklahoma cholera epidemic.) Alongside the Arkansas River for 40 miles (64 km) Big Timbers was a prime location for hunting buffalo, a major source of food for the Cheyenne. The tribe also lived on roots and berries. Big Timbers was their desired camp site in the winter.

According to Hyde, Owl Woman and her children traveled with her tribe to Big Timbers during the winter months and were at the fort itself during the summer. During the Cheyenne's winter visit to Big Timbers, Bent accompanied his family with goods for trading. At Big Timbers, Bent lived according to Cheyenne custom when he lived with them in a more casual, unstructured way of life. While Bent's Fort life was somewhat structured with William having a leadership role.

Such was the rhythm of village life. Always movement—sometimes to Big Timbers close to the buffalo herds, sometimes to the fort, but always someplace where grass was thick, wood plentiful, and water fresh and sweet.

=== Role at the fort ===
Within a short time after the marriage the couple were, according to Hyde, "the central business and social leaders of the region", having combined their familial and trading connections with the various tribes, the traders, and the authorities of both New Mexico and the US Army to considerable effect. They were both active peacemakers among the natives, explorers, and settlers who visited the fort: Mexican traders, American explorers, African slaves, hunters and trappers and members of many area Native American tribes.

Owl Woman worked in the fort and often managed the supply trains. Her position enabled her to deter predatory tribes who might have designs on the trade caravans, this [reputedly] being achieved by her flashing a signal using a mirror.

It was while at the fort in 1845 that topographical engineer Lieutenant James W. Abert asked Owl Woman to sit for him as the subject of a watercolor painting. He described that:

In the evening I got a fine sketch of 'Mis-stan-stur,' (Owl Woman), a Cheyenne squaw, who although she has been married several years and has two children, yet shows signs of having been a remarkably handsome woman. Having a white man for her husband, she has not been obliged to work, therefore her hands are in all their native beauty, small, delicately formed, and with tapering fingers; her wavy hair, unlike the Indians generally, was fine and of silken soften. She put on her handsomest dress in order to sit for me. Her cape and under garment were bordered with bands of beads, and her beautiful leggins, which extended only to the knee, were so nicely joined with the moccasin that the connection could not be perceived, and looked as neat as the stockings of our eastern belles, and the modest attitude in which she sits is characteristic, but will be best conceived by the sketch.

=== Children ===
The real fruit of the marriage was always anticipated to be the children, of whom they raised four together. These were named in English and Cheyenne:

- Mary, named for Bent's favorite sister, was born January 22, 1838. Her Cheyenne name was Ho-ka.
- Robert, named for Bent's youngest brother, was born about 1840, d. 1841. His Cheyenne name was Octavi-wee-his.
- George, was born July 7, 1843, named after Bent's brother. George was also named Ho-my-ike.
- Julia or Um-ah was born in 1847 and her English name was that of Bent's oldest sister. She married the French-Cheyenne merchant, rancher and interpreter Edmund Guerrier, whose father William Guerrier worked for Owl Woman's husband (Julia's father) William Bent.

George, Julia, and their brother Charley (son of William Bent and Owl Woman's sister Yellow Woman) all survived the Sand Creek Massacre, in which the US Army massacred approximately 150 people. George, Charley, and Yellow Woman left to join the Dog Soldiers to retaliate for the massacre.

Life at the fort, called the "mud castle of the plains", reflected the heritage of both parents. The children's clothes included linen shirts and soft-leather moccasins. There they ate on fine china and, according to Cheyenne custom, slept on the ground in soft hides. The furnishings and household goods included items from America, Mexico and international locations. Children enjoyed pumpkin pie and pancakes made by the Charlotte, a slave in service to the Bents. Chipita, the French-Mexican wife to a Bent worker, made taffy for the children; She performed housekeeping and laundry services at the fort.

Owl Woman's mother taught the children to be respectful and courteous of their elders. Discipline was given through stern glances and waving fingers by his mother and his aunts. In their multi-cultural environment, the children learned to speak many languages; George learned how to speak Cheyenne, English, Spanish, Comanche, Kiowa and Arapaho. The boys learned to ride horses bareback, control the horses actions through softly worded commands, hunt and to be warriors. The girls learned how to perform chores, like gathering wood, fetching water, and picking berries. Girls were also taught to be gracious, generous hosts. George Bent recalled of his childhood at the fort:

Something was always going on, and we children had no lack of amusements. In the fall and winter there was always a large camp of Indians just outside the fort—Cheyenne and Arapahos, and sometimes Sioux, Kiowas, Comanches, and Prairie Apaches.

Life for the Bent family changed dramatically over six years after Owl Woman's death. In 1849 a cholera epidemic swept through the Cheyenne tribe killing up to half of the people, including the children's grandmother, Tail Woman. Demand in fur declined, with a resulting drop in William Bent's business at the fort. In 1853 Bent established a stone fort in the Big Timbers area.

From 1854, subsequent to the death of Owl Woman, George was sent away to be educated at a school run by an Episcopalian in Westport, Missouri, causing him to be separated from his family for much of the time.

== Death and posthumous recognition ==
The death of Owl Woman from complications of the birth of Julia, (who was born in 1844) in 1847 was not witnessed by Bent as he was away at that time. (Note: Two of his brothers, Charles and Robert, also died in 1847.) Bent mourned deeply for Owl Woman. Her sister Island took responsibility for raising Bent and Owl Woman's children.

Owl Woman, described as "a most estimable good woman of much influence in the tribe", had worked to manage and improve relations between Native American tribes and the white man during her life.

Bent and his allies figured out a middle position between the powerful Comanches and the expanding American systems. William and Charles Bent, White Thunder, and Owl Woman created a place and a moment that used the trading systems of the Native people and the roads, wagons, and goods made by Europeans to link two very different worlds. They envisioned ... a new world that would provide sustenance and honor for their children.

Their vision did not last, being overtaken by wider events as the years passed by, but the contribution of Owl Woman was recognized posthumously. She was inducted into the Colorado Women's Hall of Fame in 1985.

In 2021 a mountain southwest of Denver (formerly "Squaw Mountain") was renamed in her honor. It will now be named "Mestaa'ėhehe (Pronounced Mes-ta-heh or Mes-ta-het) Mountain".

== See also ==
- Amache Prowers, also known as Walking Woman (c. 1846–1905), was a Native American activist, advocate, cattle rancher, and operator of a store on the Santa Fe Trail
- Chipeta, another noted Native American woman in Colorado's history
- Sand Creek Massacre
