= Charles Bent =

American politician (1799–1847)

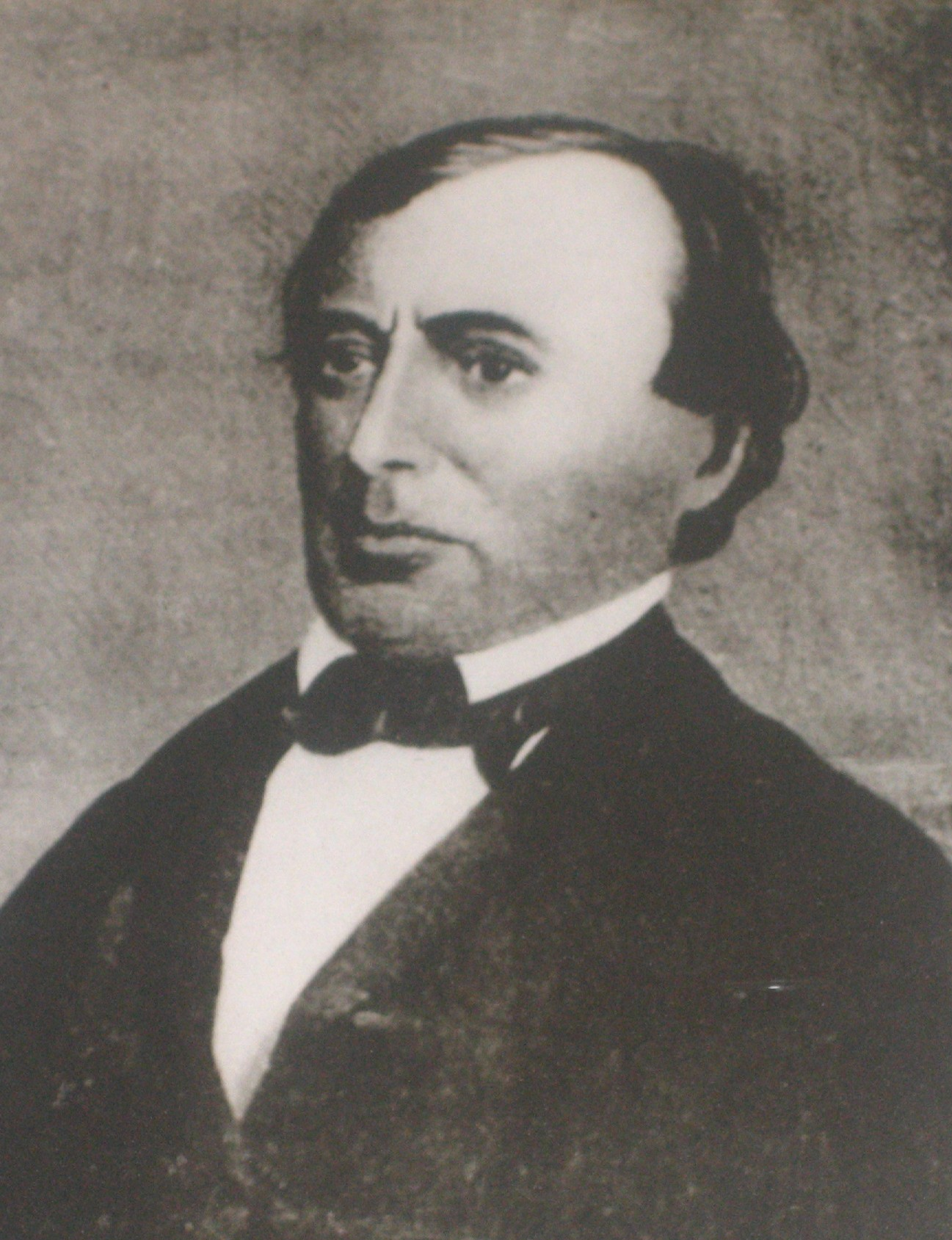

Provisional Governor of New Mexico
- In office September 22, 1846 – January 19, 1847
- Preceded by: Juan Bautista Vigil y Alarid (Santa Fe de Nuevo México)
- Succeeded by: Donaciano Vigil (United States provisional government of New Mexico); Pablo Montoya (Santa Fe de Nuevo México)

Personal details
- Born: November 11, 1799 Charleston, Virginia, U.S. (now West Virginia)
- Died: January 19, 1847 (aged 47) Taos, New Mexico Territory, U.S.
- Cause of death: Assassination
- Resting place: Santa Fe National Cemetery
- Spouse: Maria Ignacia Jaramillo
- Children: Alfred, Estifina, Maria Teresina, George (died as infant), Virginia (died as infant)
- Relatives: Silas Bent (father); Martha Kerr Bent (mother); Juliannah (sister); John (brother); Lucy (sister); Dorcas (sister); Mary (sister); George (brother); Robert (brother); Edward (brother); Silas Bent III (brother); William Bent (brother); George Bent (nephew); Owl Woman (sister-in-law); Lilburn Boggs (brother-in-law); Silas Bent IV (nephew); Henry C. Boggs (nephew); Charles Marion Russell (nephew); James Kerr (uncle)
- Education: United States Military Academy

Charles Bent (November 11, 1799 – January 19, 1847) was an American businessman and politician who served as the first civilian United States governor of the United States provisional government of New Mexico, newly invaded and occupied by the United States during the Mexican-American War by the Military Governor, Stephen Watts Kearny, in September 1846 until his death.

Bent had been working as a fur trader in the region since 1828, with his younger brother, William, and later partner Ceran St. Vrain. Though his office was in Santa Fe, Bent maintained his residence and a trading post in Taos, New Mexico Territory, in present-day New Mexico. On January 19, 1847, Bent was scalped and killed by Pueblo warriors, during the Taos Revolt.

== Early life ==
Charles Louis Bent was born in Charleston, Virginia, the oldest of the ten children of Judge Silas Bent, and his wife Martha Kerr.

The other children were: Juliannah, Joh, Lucy, Dorcas, William, Mary, George, Robert, Edward, and Silas.

== Career ==
=== U.S. Army and Bent & St. Vrain Company ===
After leaving the army, in 1828, Charles and his younger brother, William, took a wagon train of goods from St. Louis to Santa Fe. There they established mercantile contacts and began a series of trading trips back and forth over the Santa Fe Trail. In 1832, he formed a partnership with Ceran St. Vrain, another trader from St. Louis, called Bent & St. Vrain Company. In addition to its store in Taos, New Mexico, the trading company established a series of "forts", fortified trading posts, to facilitate trade with the Plains Indians, including Fort Saint Vrain on the South Platte River and Bent's Fort on the Arkansas River, both in Colorado, and Fort Adobe on the Canadian River. Bent's Fort, outside La Junta, Colorado, has been restored and is now a National Historic Site.

=== Territorial Governor ===
Following the occupation of New Mexico as part of the Mexican-American War, many of the inhabitants of New Mexico were not happy about the new American rule. Some mourned the loss of the old connection with Mexico, others feared the loss of their private goods, and others hated Bent, the New Mexican Territorial Governor who served under the U.S. war-time occupation, because of his negative attitude towards Mexicans. In December 1846, the influential families in the state started to plan a revolt against their new rulers. Governor Bent and Colonel Sterling Price found out about the conspiracy and some of the leaders of the movement were arrested, but two important ones were able to escape.

== Torture and death ==
In January 1847, while serving as territorial governor, Bent traveled to his home Taos without military protection. After arriving, he was scalped alive and murdered in his home by a group of Hispano and Pueblo attackers during the Taos Revolt. Bent is buried in the National Cemetery in Santa Fe.

Upon entering the Bent home, the insurgents clubbed Bent’s wife Ignacio and shot and killed a Navajo servant girl who lived with Bent’s family as she attempted to protect Ignacio, while other members of the household fled to safety next door through a hole in the parlor wall.

In the following months, Colonel Price was able to quell the uprising, which ended in July 1847. Most of the rebels were caught and some of them were executed.

== Personal life ==
In 1835, Charles "Carlos" Bent married Maria Ignacia Jaramillo, who was born in Taos, New Mexico. Maria's younger sister, Josefa Jaramillo, would later marry Kit Carson.

Charles and Maria had five children: Alfred, Estifina, Teresina, George (died as infant), and Virginia (died as infant). Alfred was murdered at Taos on December 9, 1865. Yiorgos Caralambo (a.k.a. Greek George) was allegedly hired as the assassin by people with interests in the Maxwell Land Grant, 1/4 of which Alfred and his two sisters inherited from their father Charles. Lucien B. Maxwell, Charles Beaubien, and Guadalupe Miranda held large other portions of the grant.

Charles's brothers Robert and George died at Bent's Fort (1846 and 1841, respectively).

== Slave Owner ==
Charles Bent owned Charlotte and Dick Green, who worked at Bent's Fort. William Bent freed the couple after Dick fought with the posse that avenged Charles's assassination.

== Legacy ==
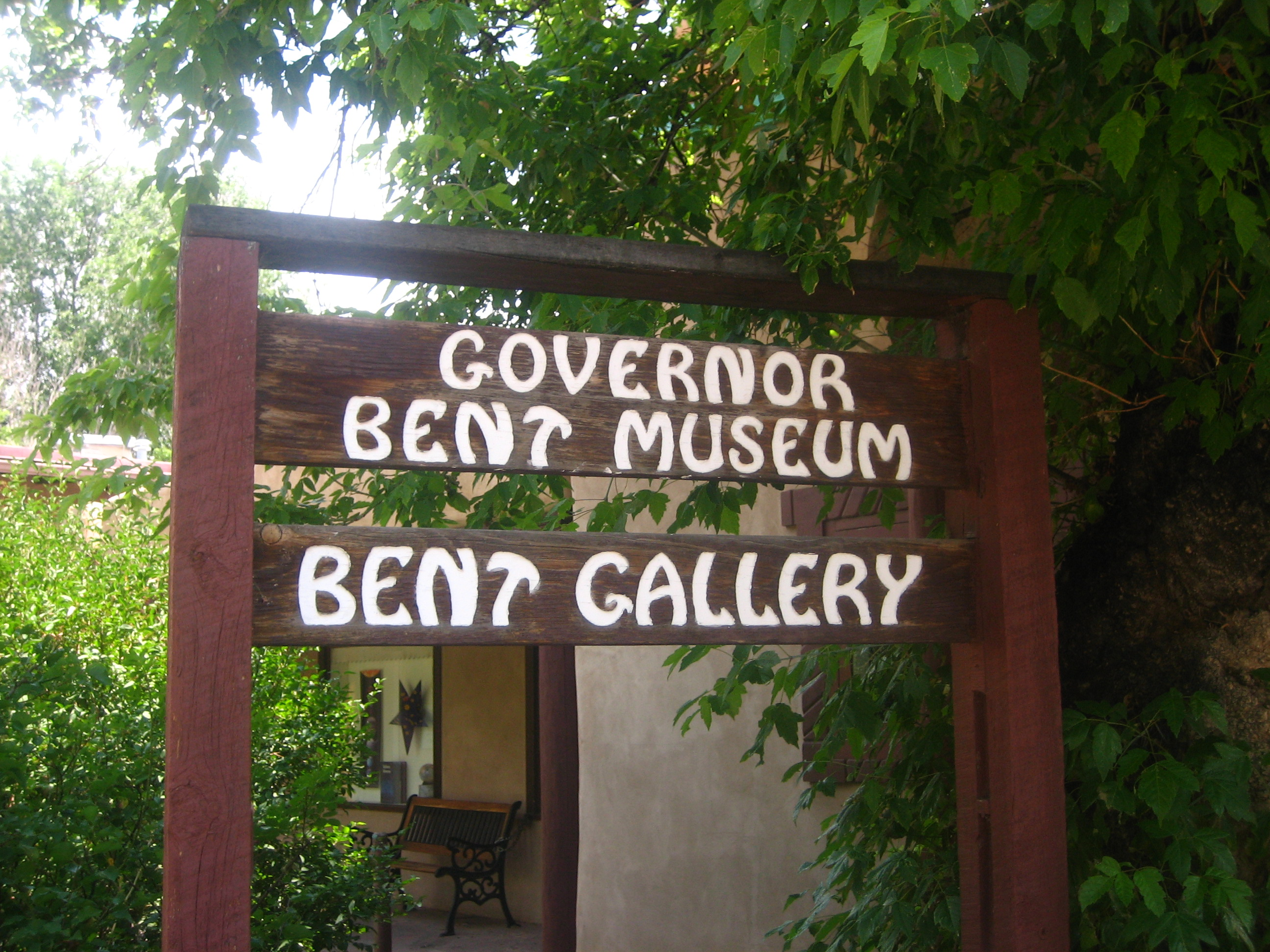
Sign directing visitors to Governor Bent Home/Museum and Gallery in Taos

Bent Street, which runs in front of what had been his home in Taos, and Martyr's Lane, which runs behind it, are named for him.

The Governor Charles Bent House is now a museum. An elementary school in northeast Albuquerque is named in Bent's honor.

== Works ==
Bent documented the indigenous peoples of New Mexico in an essay which was published posthumously in Henry Schoolcraft's study of American Indians:

- Bent, Charles (1846). "Indian Tribes of New Mexico". In Schoolcraft, Henry R (ed.). Information respecting the history, condition and prospects of the Indian tribes of the United States. Vol. I. Philadelphia: Lippincott, Grambo & Company, 1851. pp. 242–246. ISBN 9780598563460.

== See also ==
- List of assassinated American politicians

== Notes ==
Political offices
Preceded by Juan Bautista Vigil y Alarid	Governor of New Mexico; 1846–1847	Succeeded by Donaciano Vigil
