= Silas Bent (naval officer) =

Silas Bent III
- Silas Bent ca1870
- Born: October 10, 1820; St. Louis, Missouri
- Died: August 26, 1887 (aged 66); Shelter Island, Long Island, New York
- Spouse: Ann Elizabeth Tyler
- Children: Mary Lawrence Bent; Lucy (Bent) McKinley; Silas Bent IV
- Relatives: Owl Woman (sister-in-law); George Bent (nephew); Lilburn Boggs (brother-in-law); Henry C. Boggs (nephew); Charles Marion Russell (nephew)
- Military career
- Allegiance: United States
- Branch: U.S. Navy
- Service years: 1836-1861
- Rank: Lieutenant
- Unit: Hydrographic Division of the United States Coast Survey
- Conflicts: Nagasaki, Japan, rescue mission
- Awards: Commendation for published hydrographic surveys of Japanese waters

Silas Bent III (October 10, 1820 – August 26, 1887) was a naval officer in the United States Navy before the American Civil War. Silas Bent sailed both the Atlantic and Pacific Oceans and was recognized by the Navy for his contributions to oceanography published by the Navy. Silas Bent resigned his commission at the outset of the American Civil War, as his sympathy was for the Southern Confederacy.

== Early life and family ==
Silas Bent III was born on 10 October 1820 in St. Louis, Missouri, a son of a judge of the Missouri Supreme Court, also called Silas, with deep family roots in Massachusetts Bay Colony. His brothers included the traders William Bent and Charles Bent, the latter being the first territorial Governor of New Mexico during the Mexican-American War (until he was assassinated in the Taos Revolt of 1847). He married Ann Elizabeth Tyler of Louisville, Kentucky on 5 November 1857. They had three children: Mary Lawrence Bent, Lucy (Bent) McKinley, and Silas Bent IV, who was a journalist.

== U.S. Naval service ==
Bent was appointed midshipman at the United States Naval Academy at age 16 and served in the U.S. Navy for the next 25 years, during which he became well versed in the science of oceanography. He reached the rank of master in 1849 and lieutenant on August 1, 1849. He crossed the Atlantic Ocean five times, the Pacific Ocean twice, rounded Cape Horn four times and the Cape of Good Hope once.

== Rescuing Americans at Nagasaki ==
He was serving under Commander James Glynn in Preble in 1849 when that brig sailed into Nagasaki, Japan, to secure the release of 18 shipwrecked American sailors imprisoned by the Japanese. He was flag lieutenant in Mississippi, Commodore Matthew C. Perry's flagship during the expedition to Japan between 1852 and 1854.

The poet and diplomat Bayard Taylor, who accompanied Commodore Perry, wrote of Silas: "Too much credit, however, cannot be awarded to the different officers, and especially to Liet. Bent, for the coolness and courage with which they prosecuted their work. When we consider that this, one of the greatest bays in the world, had hitherto never been surveyed, the interest and value of their labors will be better understood."

== Hydrographic surveys ==
He made hydrographic surveys of Japanese waters. The results of his survey were published by the government in 1857 in Sailing Directions and Nautical Remarks: by Officers of the Late U.S. Naval Expedition to Japan.

== American Civil War ==
=== Resigned due to Southern sympathies ===
In 1860, Lt. Bent was detailed to the Hydrographic Division of the United States Coast Survey, but resigned from the Navy on 25 April 1861 at the outbreak of the American Civil War, apparently because of Southern sympathies.

=== Southern Relief Commission ===
Bent served as Chairman of the St. Louis chapter of the Missouri Southern Relief Association, which raised funds to support widows of Confederate soldiers after the American Civil War. The Association organized a fundraiser fair in October 1866.

=== Sterling Price Monument ===
Bent served on the Board of Directors of an association which raised funds to erect a monument Sterling Price in St. Louis's Bellefontaine Cemetery. Price had served as a U.S. Army General in the Mexican-American War, the 11th Governor of Missouri, and a Major General in the Confederate States Army during the American Civil War.

== Final years ==
He returned to St. Louis upon resigning from the Navy and took up the management of his wife's estate. Lt. Bent died on 26 August 1887 at Shelter Island, Long Island, New York, and was buried in Louisville, Kentucky.

== Honored in ship naming ==
The Silas Bent-class of US Navy ships, including the USNS Silas Bent (T-AGS-26), an oceanographic survey ship, was named in his honor in March 1964.

== See also ==
- Bakumatsu
- United States Coast and Geodetic Survey
- Hydrography
