= Bent's Old Fort National Historic Site =

National Historic Site in Otero County, Colorado, United States

- Bent's Old Fort
- U.S. National Register of Historic Places
- U.S. National Historic Landmark
- U.S. National Historic Site
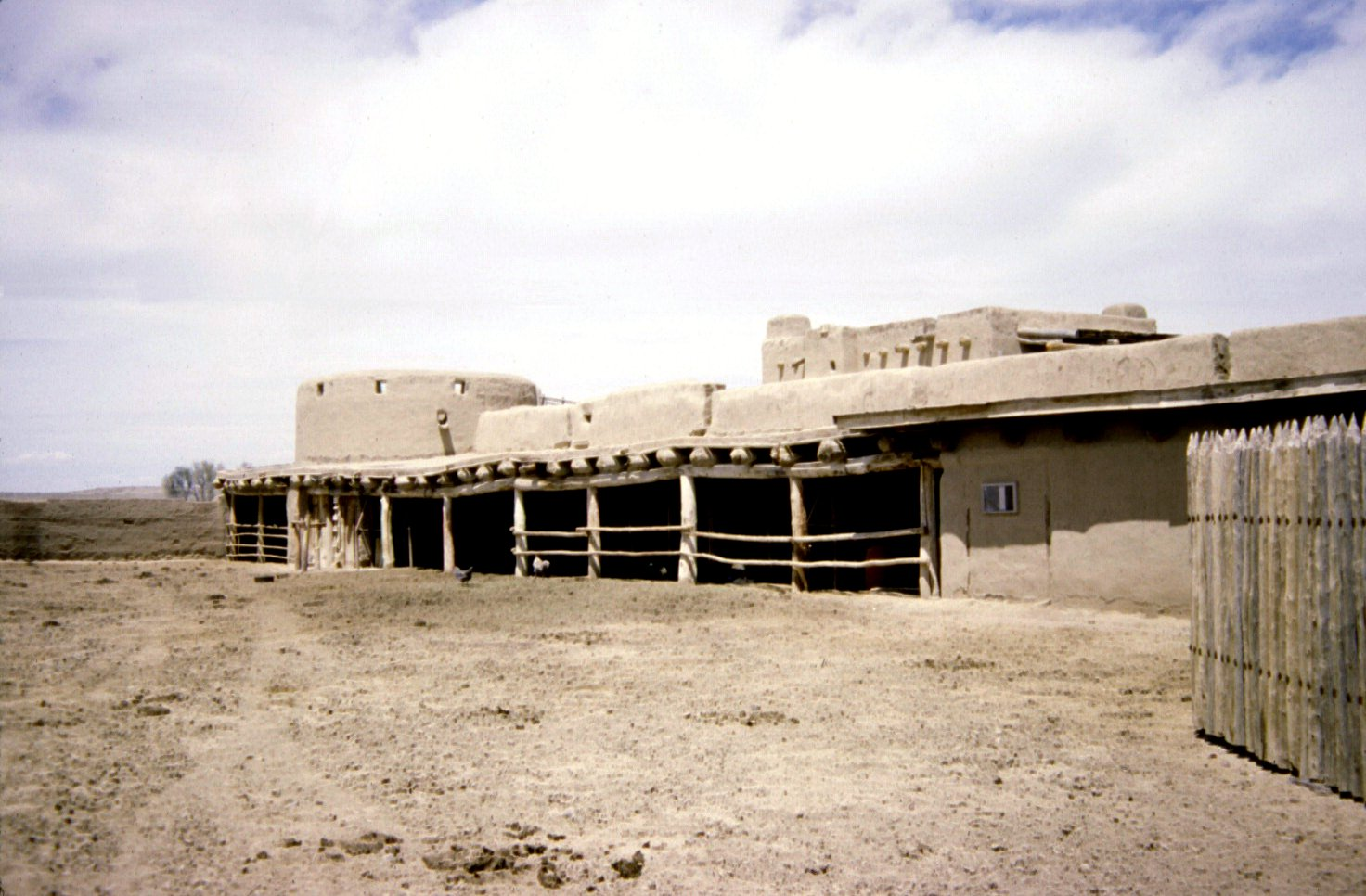
- Bent's Old Fort

- Location within the United States Location within Colorado
- Location: Otero County, Colorado, United States
- Nearest city: La Junta, Colorado
- Coordinates: 38.0406°N 103.4294°W
- Area: 799 acres (3.23 km^{2})
- Built: 1833
- Architects: William Bent; Charles Bent
- Visitation: 7,190 (2025)
- Website: Bent's Old Fort National Historic Site
- NRHP reference No.: 66000254

Significant dates
- Added to NRHP: October 15, 1966
- Designated NHL: June 3, 1960
- Designated NHS: December 19, 1960

Bent's Old Fort is a historical fort located in Otero County in southeastern Colorado, United States. A company owned by Charles Bent and William Bent and Ceran St. Vrain built the fort in 1833 to trade with Southern Cheyenne and Arapaho Plains Indians and trappers for buffalo robes. For much of its 16-year operation as a trading post, the fort was the only major white American permanent settlement on the Santa Fe Trail between Missouri and the Mexican settlements. It was initially abandoned by William Bent in 1849.

The fort was reconstructed in 1976 and is open to the public. The area of the fort was designated a National Historic Site under the National Park Service on June 3, 1960. It was further designated a National Historic Landmark later that year on December 19, 1960.

== History ==
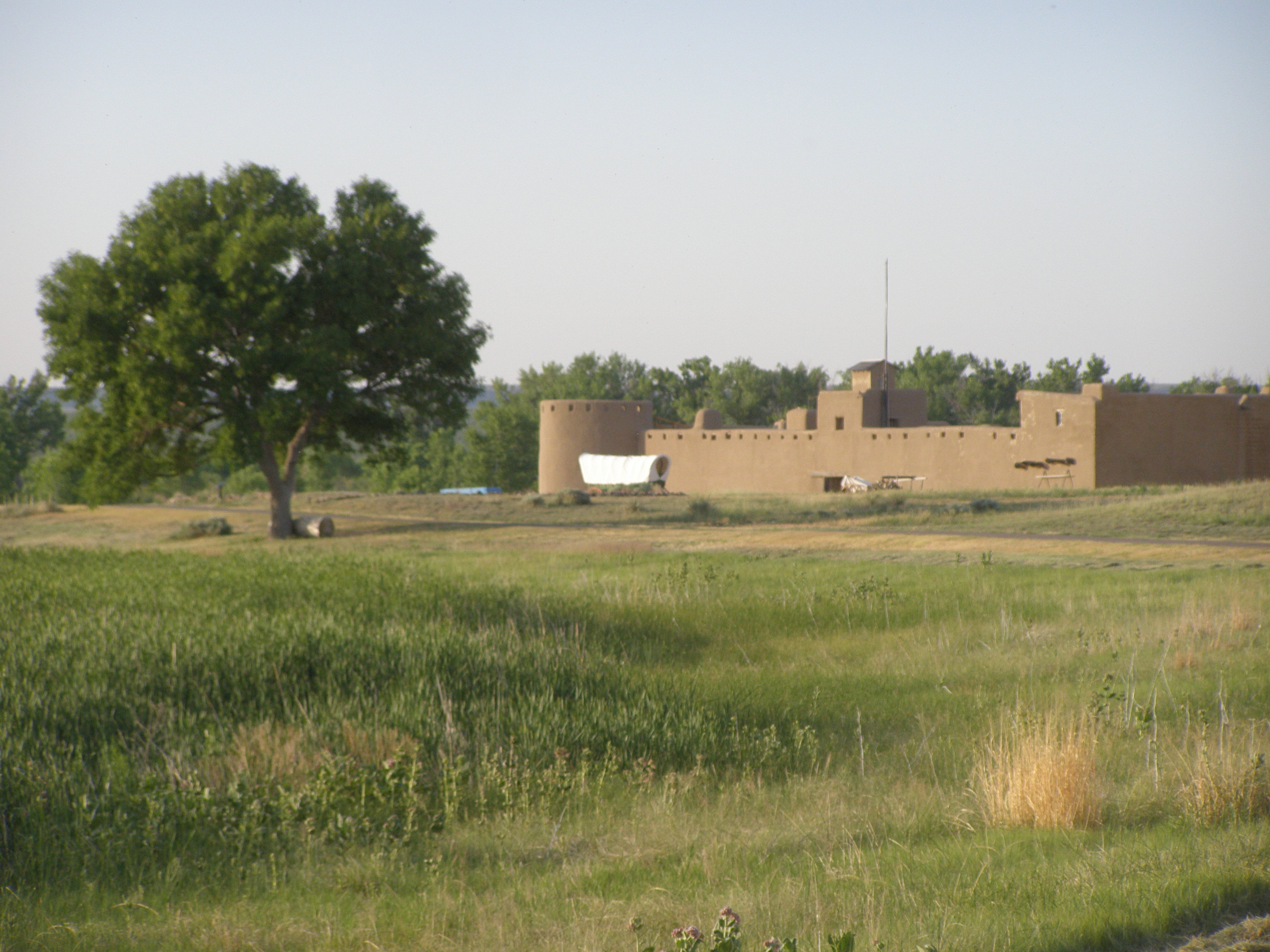
Approach to Bent's Old Fort, Colorado. Wetlands protecting the north trail.

The adobe fort quickly became the center of the Bent, St. Vrain Company's expanding trade empire, which included Fort Saint Vrain to the north and Fort Adobe to the south, along with company stores in New Mexico at Taos and Santa Fe. The primary trade was with the Southern Cheyenne and Arapaho Indians for buffalo robes.

From 1833 to 1849, the fort was a stopping point along the Santa Fe Trail. From 1833 to 1849, the fort was a key trading hub along the Santa Fe Trail. Although founded by American traders, it was located on Mexican territory and operated under Mexican jurisdiction until 1848. Bent, St. Vrain & Company obtained Mexican trading licenses and paid customs duties on goods moving through the region. The fort maintained close economic and legal ties to Mexican New Mexico, serving as a critical link between U.S. and Mexican trade networks. The U.S. Army, explorers, and other travelers stopped at the fort to replenish supplies, such as water and food, and perform needed maintenance to their wagons. The American frontiersman Kit Carson was employed as a hunter by the Bent brothers in 1841, and regularly visited the Fort. Likewise, the explorer John C. Frémont used the Fort as both a staging area and a replenishment junction, for his expeditions. During the Mexican–American War in 1846, the fort became a staging area for Colonel Stephen Watts Kearny's "Army of the West".

Ralph Emerson Twitchell makes the following statement.

Bent's Fort is described as having been a structure built of adobe bricks. It was 180 feet long and 135 feet wide. The walls were 15 feet in height and four feet thick and it was the strongest post at that time west of Ft. Leavenworth. The construction of this fort was commenced in 1828 ... at a point on the Arkansas somewhere between the present cities of Pueblo and Canon City, having been disadvantageously located. Four years were required in which to complete the structure. On the northwest and southeast corners were hexagonal bastions, in which were mounted a number of cannon. The walls of the fort served as walls of the rooms, all of which faced inwardly on a court or plaza. The walls were loopholed for musketry, and the entrance was through large wooden gates of very heavy timbers.

== Abandonment ==
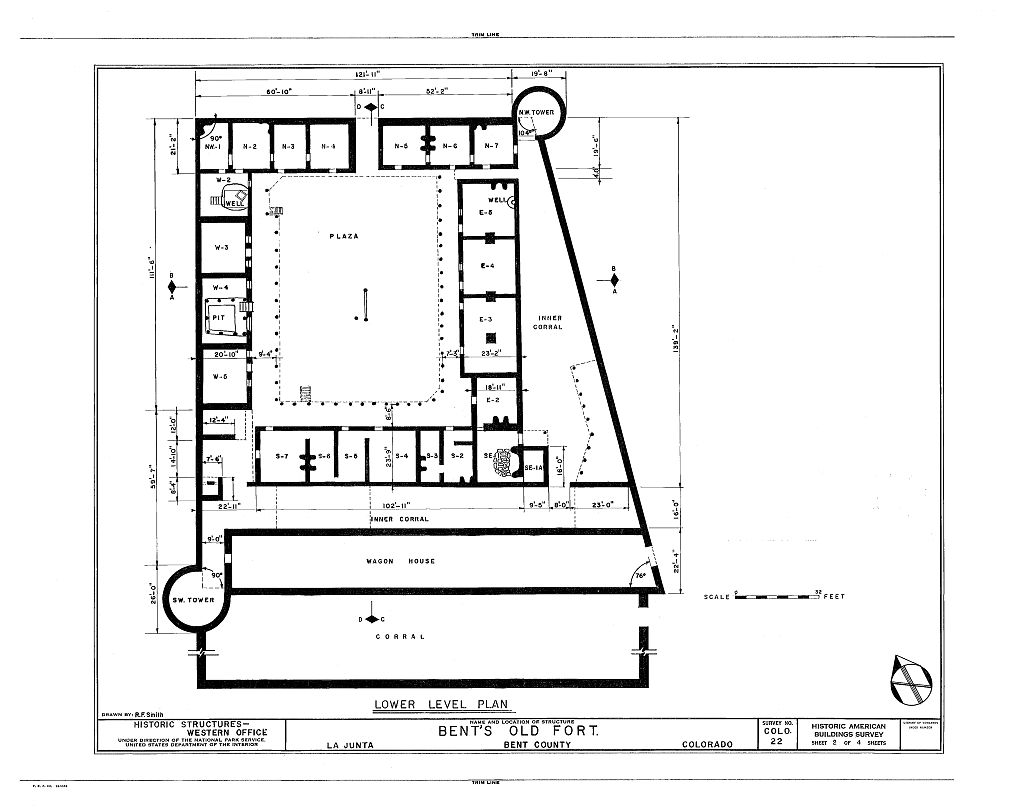
Bent's Old Fort, Lower Level Plan

In 1849 when a great cholera epidemic struck the Cheyenne and other Plains Indians, William Bent abandoned Bent's Fort and moved his headquarters north to Fort Saint Vrain on the South Platte. When he returned south in 1852, he relocated his trading business to his log trading post at Big Timbers, near what is now Lamar, Colorado. Later, in the fall of 1853, Bent began building a stone fort on the bluff above Big Timbers, Bent's New Fort, where he conducted his trading business until 1860.

When the fort was reconstructed in 1976, its design was based on the use of archaeological excavations, paintings and original sketches, diaries and other existing historical data from the period, as well as significant guesswork.

== In popular culture ==
- The Fort was used as Fort Laramie in the 1979 CBS mini-series The Chisholms, starring Robert Preston.
- In George MacDonald Fraser's 1982 novel, Flashman and the Redskins, the anti-hero Flashman is present at the destruction of Bents' Fort.
- Bent's Fort is featured briefly in Larry McMurty's 1985 Pulitzer Prize-winning novel Lonesome Dove, as well as in the 1989 Emmy Award-winning four-part TV miniseries adapted from the book.
- Bent's Fort in the spring of 1834 is a major setting for Terry Johnston's 1988 novel One-Eyed Dream.
- Bent's Fort is featured briefly in episode 3 of James Michener's Centennial miniseries in 1978.
- Bent's Fort inspired video game developer Rockstar Games to recreate its likeness in the 2010 game Red Dead Redemption as Fort Mercer in the Rio Bravo region.
- A restaurant named "The Fort" in Morrison, Colorado, near Denver has architecture and decor adapted from Bent's Old Fort, with motif and cuisine inspired from the region in the 1830s.

== Gallery ==
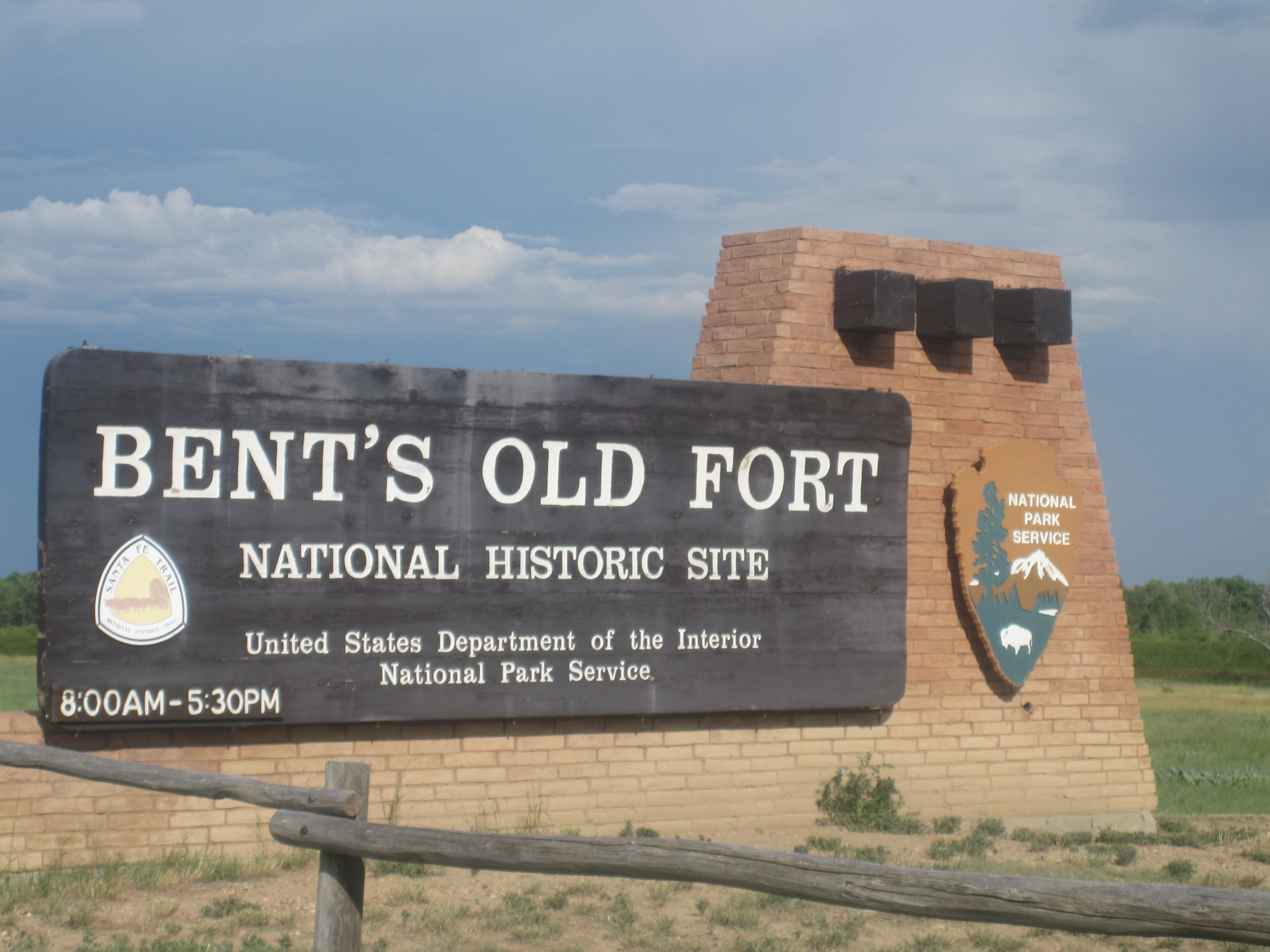
Bent's Old Fort entrance sign in Otero County, Colorado

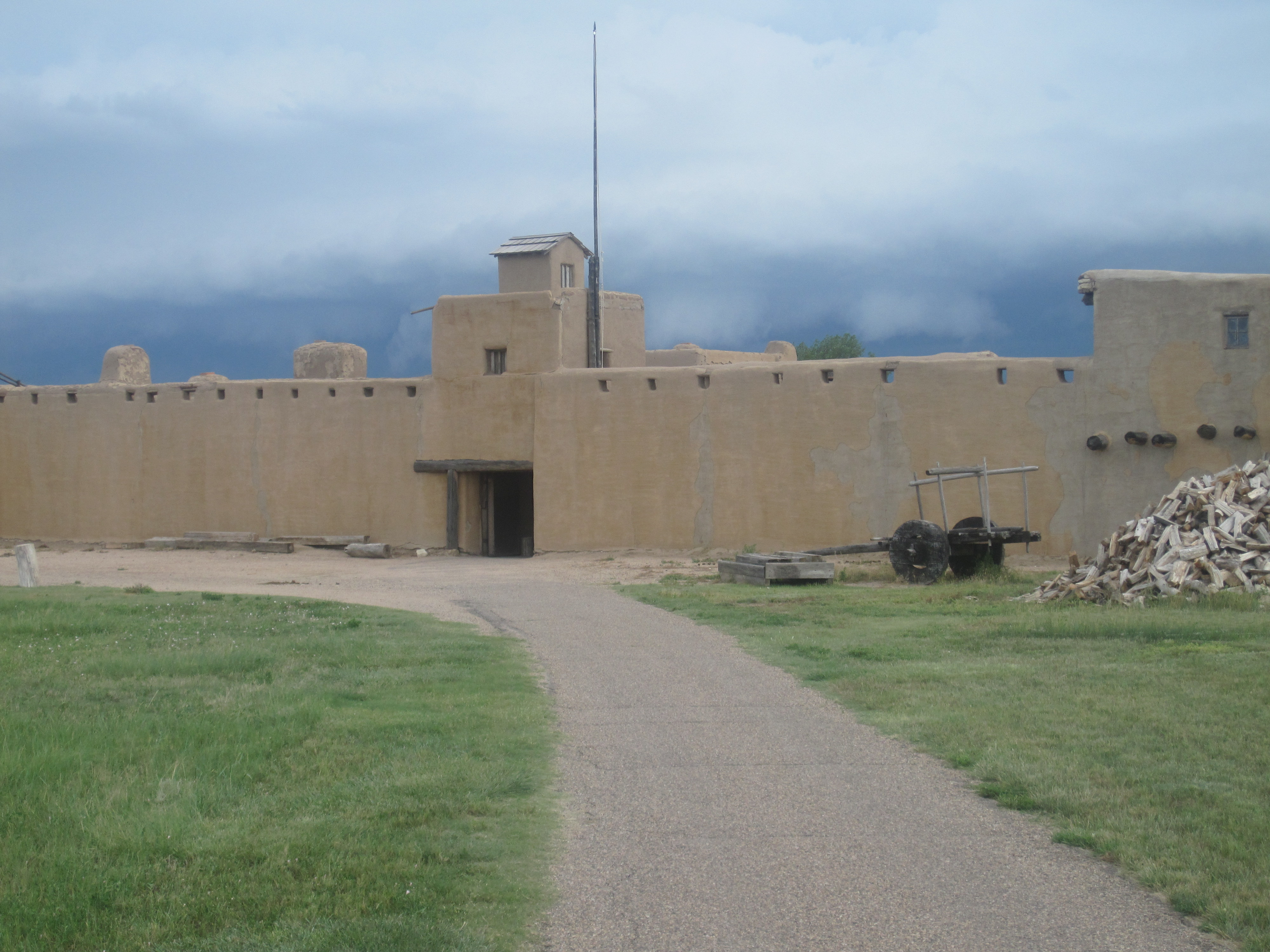
Bent's Old Fort outside view

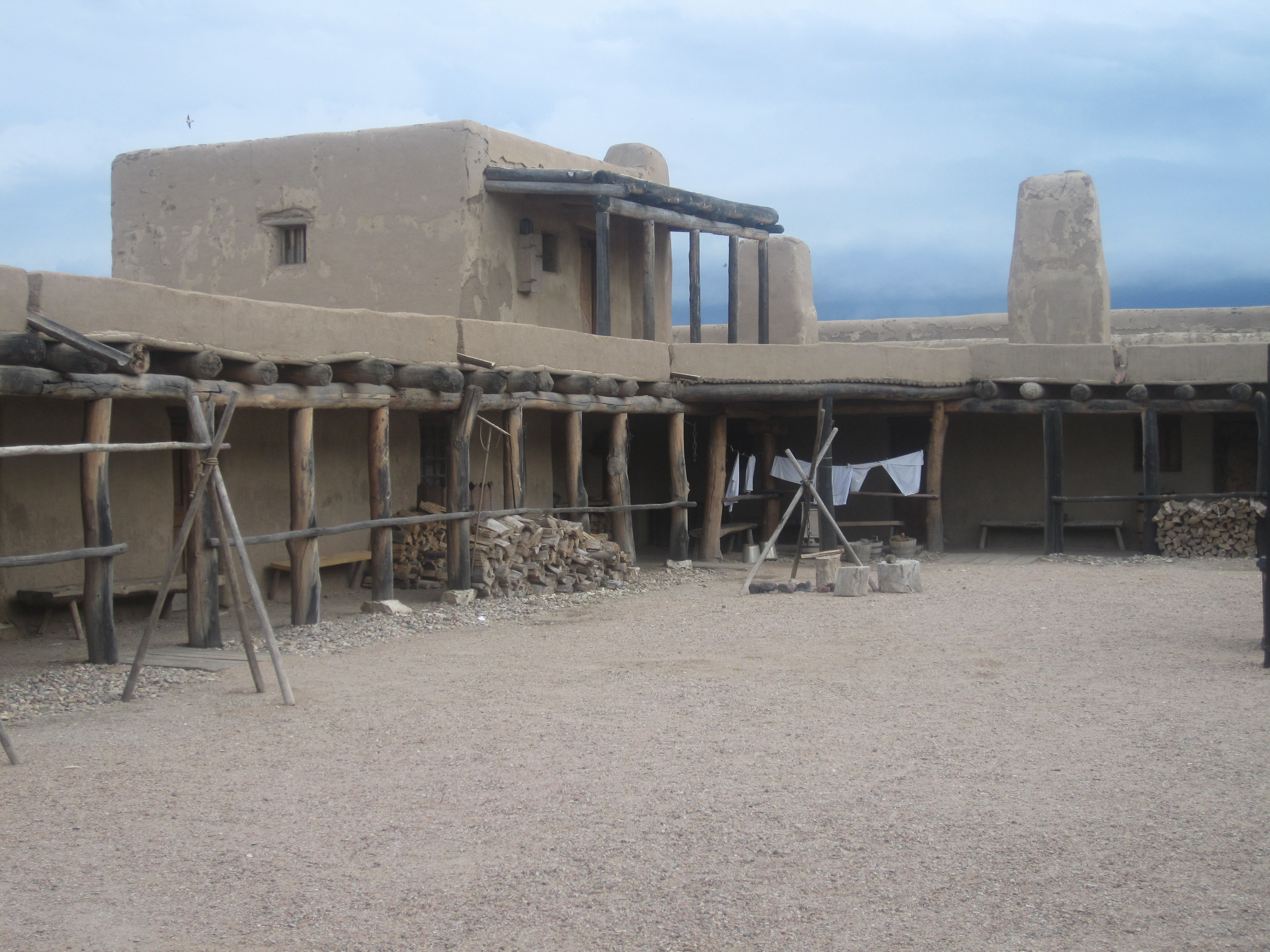
"Gentlemen" who stopped by the fort while traveling the Santa Fe Trail stayed in the upstairs quarters.

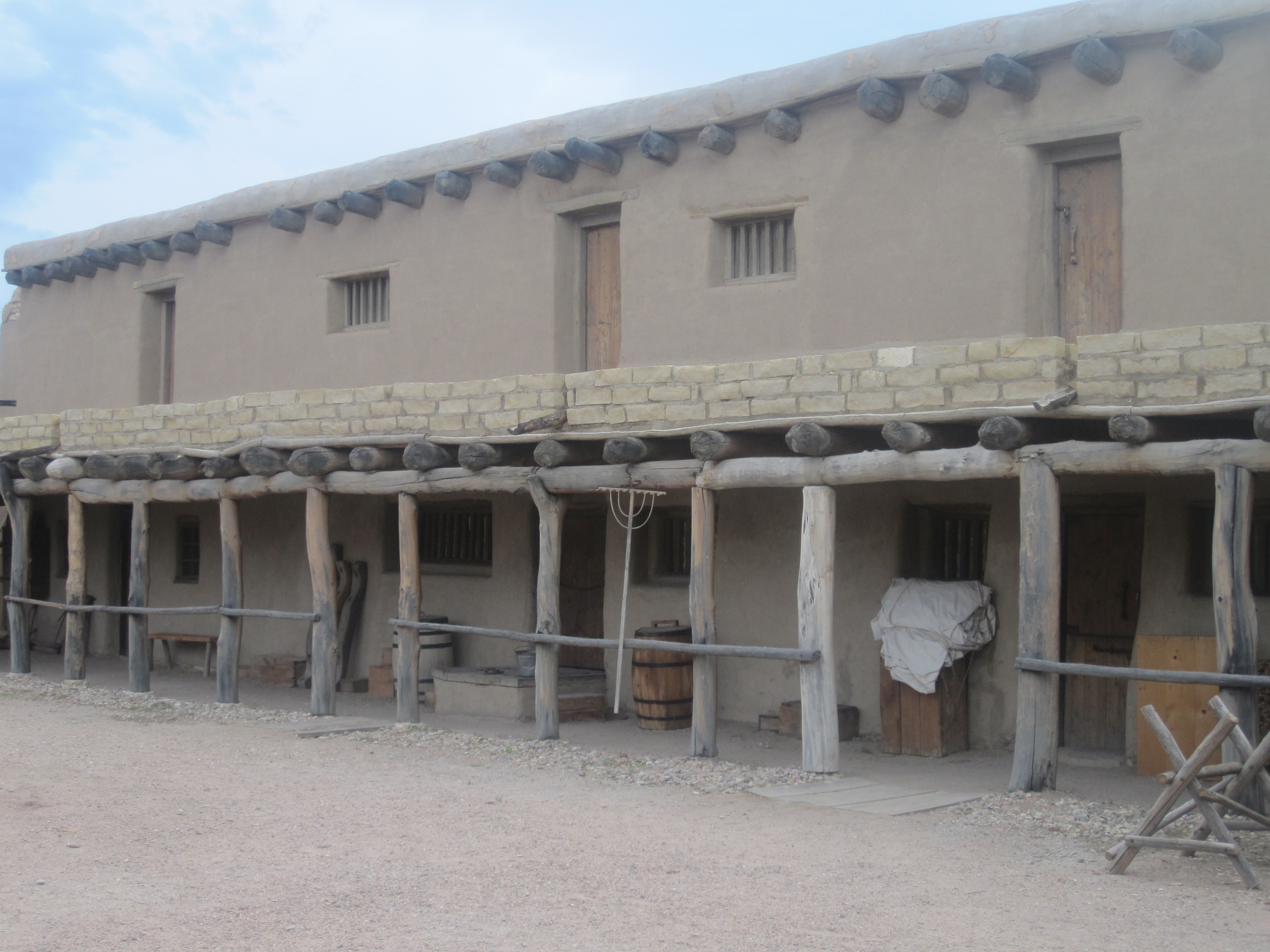
Row of rooms on the right side of the fort

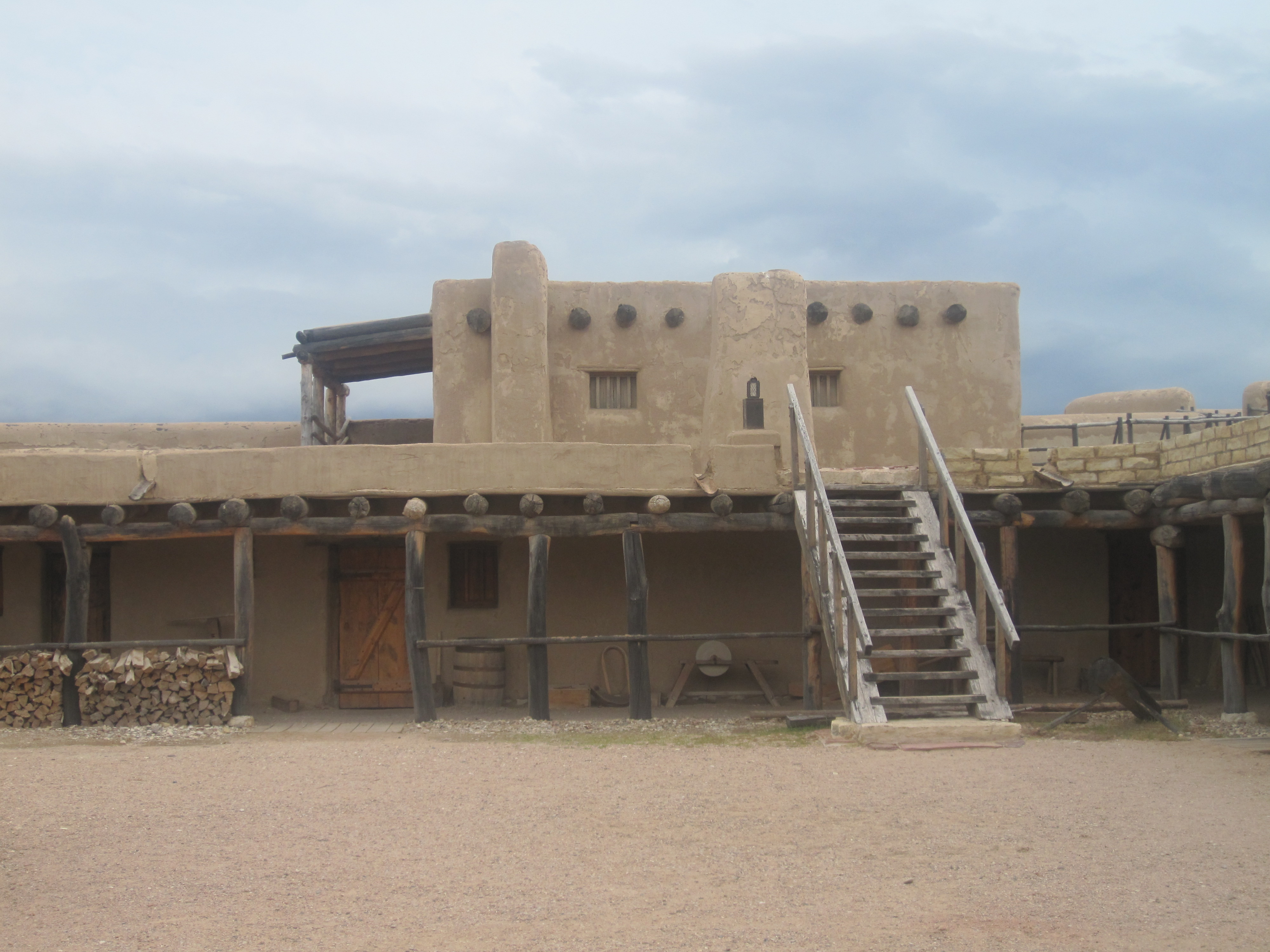
The billiards room was located on the second floor of the fort.

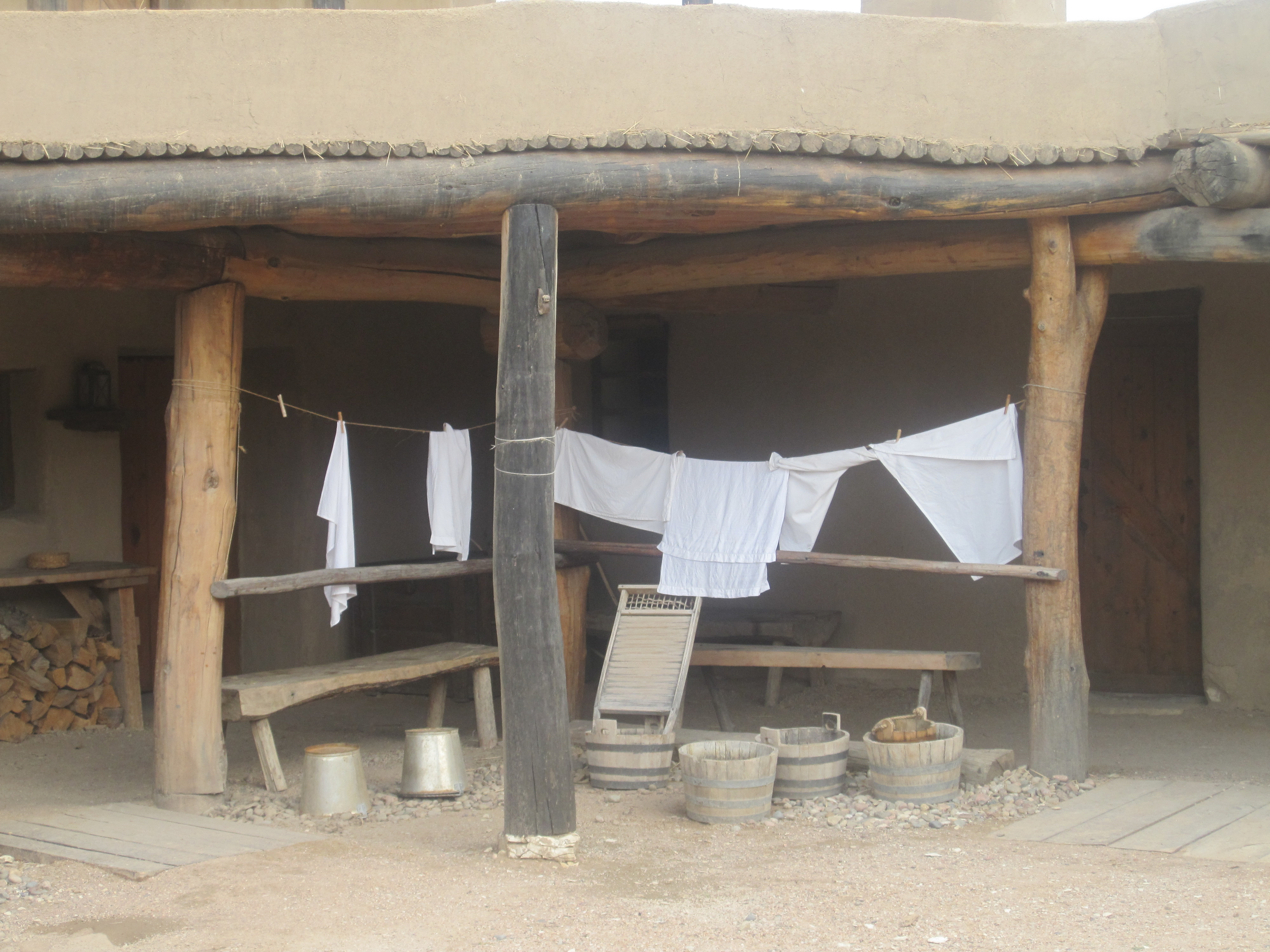
Clothes washing area at Bent's Old Fort

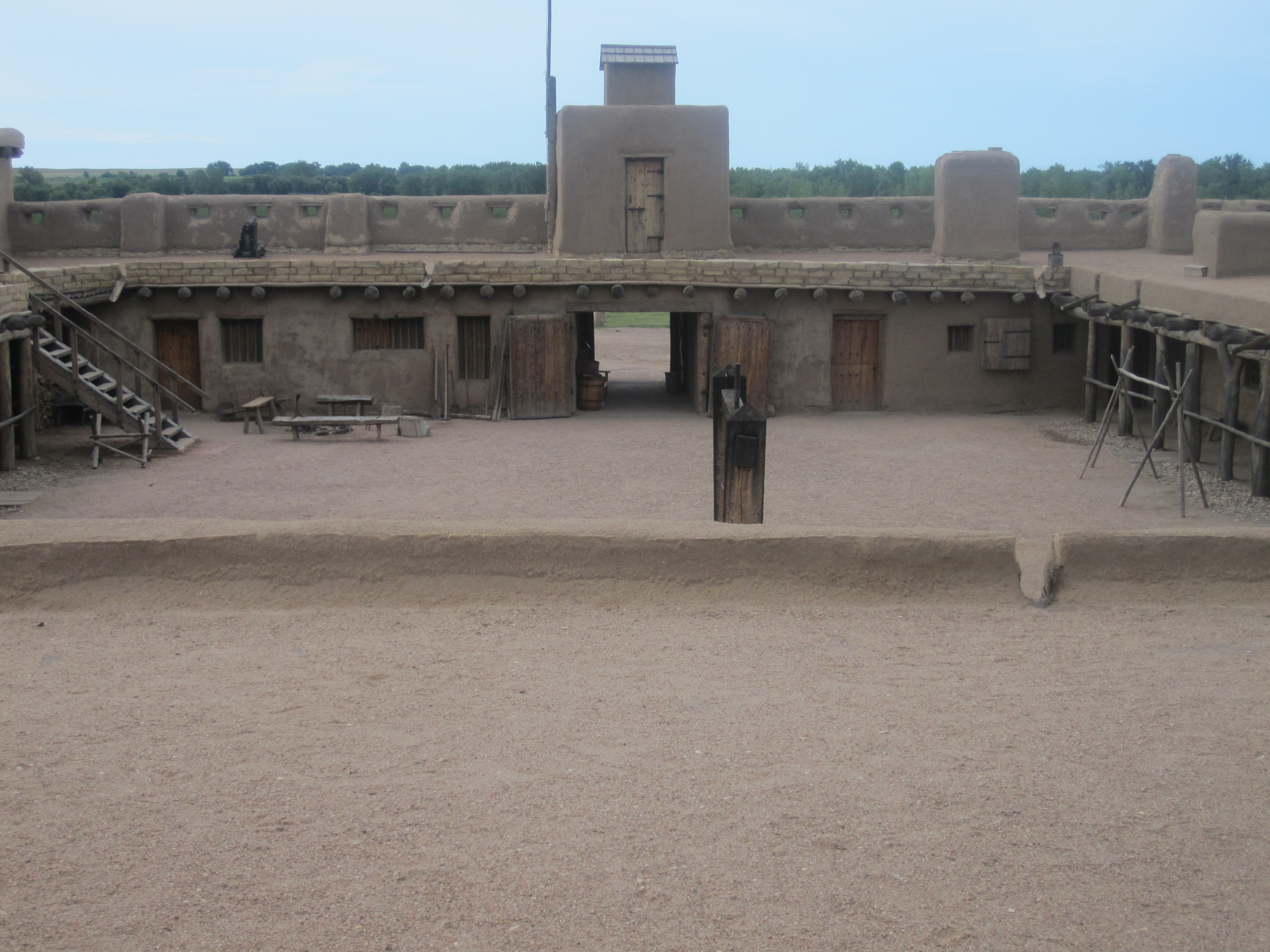
View of the entrance from inside Bent's Old Fort

== See also ==
- First Battle of Adobe Walls
- List of forts in Colorado
- List of ghost towns in Colorado
- List of National Historic Landmarks in Colorado
- List of protected areas in Colorado
- List of trading posts in Colorado
- Owl Woman
