= Caddoa, Colorado =

Ghost town in Bent County, Colorado, USA

- Ghost town
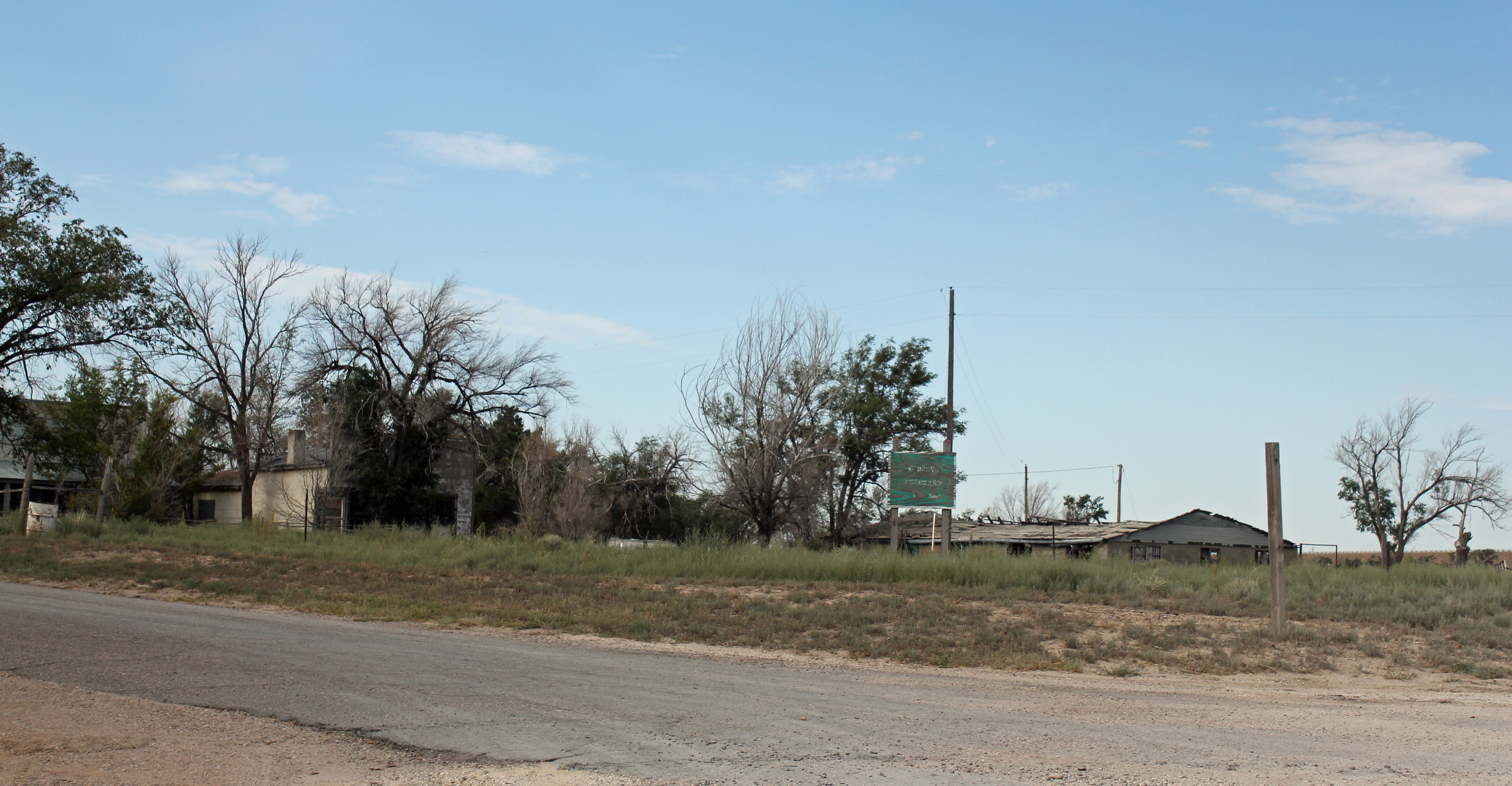
- View of Caddoa

- Location of Caddoa, Colorado. Caddoa (Colorado)
- Coordinates: 38°02′52″N 102°57′58″W
- Country: United States
- State: Colorado
- County: Bent
- Elevation: 3,881 ft (1,183 m)
- Time zone: UTC−7 (MST)
  - Summer (DST): UTC−6 (MDT)
- ZIP Code: 81044 (Hasty)
- Area code: 719
- GNIS ID: 195550
- FIPS code: 08-11095

Caddoa is an extinct town located in Bent County, Colorado, United States. The community took its name from nearby Caddoa Creek.

== History ==
The Caddoa post office operated from November 7, 1881, until March 7, 1958. The U.S. Post Office at Hasty (ZIP Code 81044) now serves the Caddoa area.

Caddoa District, from the construction of John Martin Reservoir, moved to Caddoa from the Tucumcari District after the Conchas Project finished.

== Notable people ==
- Vena Pointer, Colorado's first female water lawyer and member of the 1933 Caddoa Commission.
- John Wesley Prowers, who operated a stagecoach station at his home in Caddoa.
- James H. Stratton, Brigadier General in the United States Army, who was in charge of the John Martin Reservoir project.

== See also ==
- List of ghost towns in Colorado
- List of post offices in Colorado
