= Vena Pointer =

American lawyer

Vena Pointer (1880 – 1971), was Colorado's first female lawyer of water law. She was born in Kansas and moved to Colorado in 1911 after she took a job working in George Wallis' law firm. Throughout her career, Pointer worked as a prominent member of Colorado's water community and served as one of the original board members of the Colorado Water Conservation Board when it was founded in 1937.

== Career ==
Pointer was the last person in Colorado to be admitted to the bar under the practice of clerkship. Clerkship was a system in which, a person would read the law, rather than attended law school, in preparation for admittance to the bar. Pointer read the law for seven years and passed her examination in 1926, making her Colorado's first female water lawyer. Following her admittance to the bar, Pointer worked with her law partner Fred Sabin in Pueblo, Colorado till his death in 1931.

Throughout her career, Pointer served as distinguished member of the Colorado water community. She served as the secretary of the Arkansas Valley Ditch Association from 1919–1959. During her career, Pointer worked on projects that attempted to solve and settle water disputes between Colorado and Kansas on the Arkansas River. In part, her work was central to development of the Arkansas River Compact. Signed in 1949 the Arkansas River Compact settled a number of disputes over water rights between Kansas and Colorado that had existed since 1901.

In part, her prominence in Colorado water law led Governor Edwin C. Johnson to appoint Pointer to serve as a member of the 1933 Caddoa Commission. This commission was tasked with studying the feasibility of constructing a flood-control reservoir near the small town of Caddoa, Colorado. The construction of the Caddoa dam and reservoir represented one way to develop new water supplies for the Arkansas River, while also providing flood and irrigation control to Kansas' water users. Construction on the dam began in 1940 and in the same year it was renamed the John Martin Reservoir, after Senator John A. Martin.
