= James Stratton =

James Stratton may refer to:

- James Robert Stratton, Ontario businessman and political figure
- James H. Stratton, United States Army general
