= John Martin Reservoir State Park =

State park in Bent County, Colorado

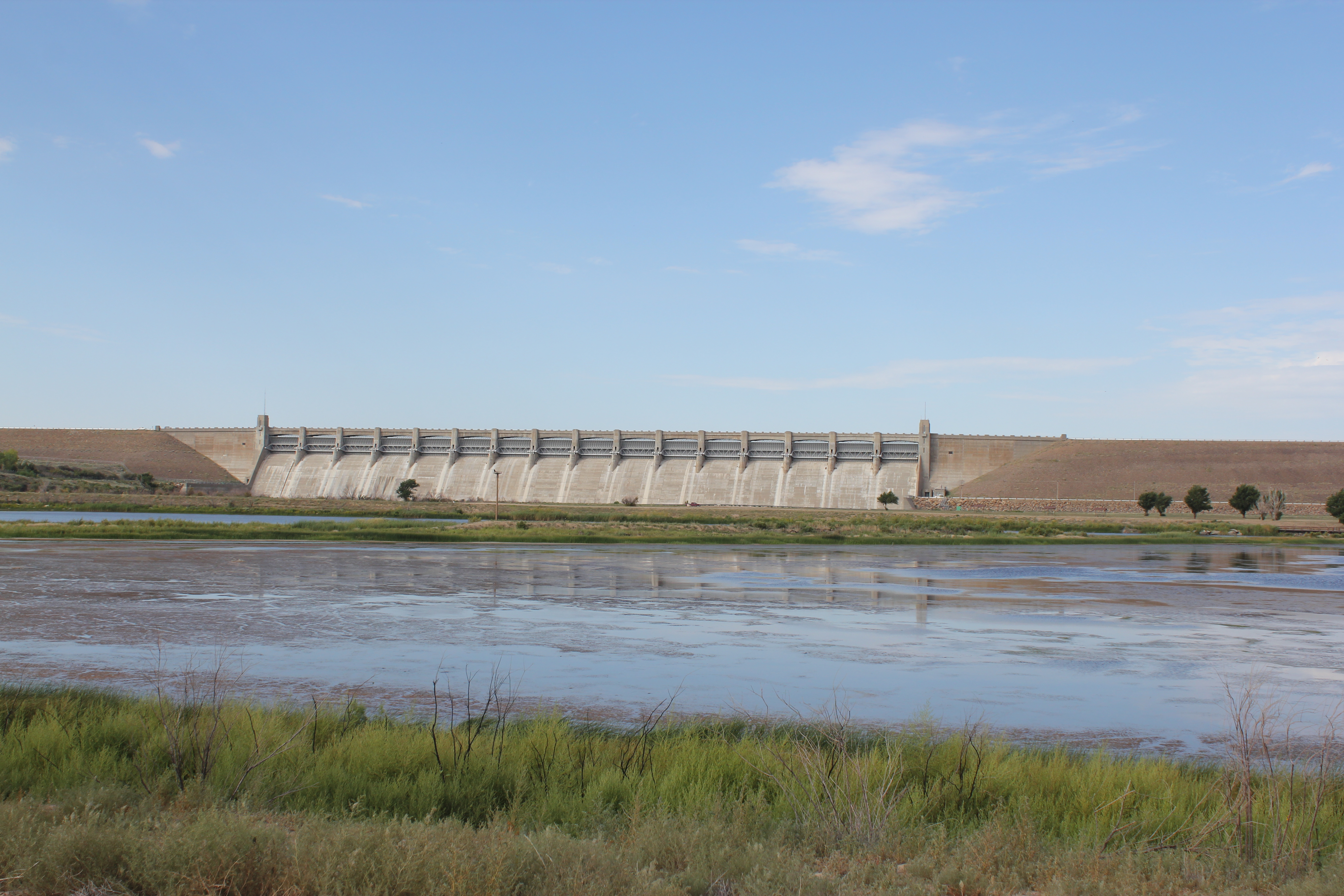
- A view of the dam, near one of the park's campgrounds.

- Location within Colorado
- Location: Bent County, Colorado, U.S.
- Nearest city: Las Animas, Colorado
- Coordinates: 38°04′29″N 102°55′50″W
- Area: 13,176 acres (53.32 km^{2})
- Established: 2001
- Visitors: 293,698 (in 2021)
- Governing body: Colorado Parks and Wildlife

John Martin Reservoir State Park is a state park in Colorado. It contains John Martin Reservoir, which is the second largest body of water in Colorado by capacity. It is also known for being a prime birdwatching location. Bent County, Colorado has been documented to have over 400 different species of birds. The namesake reservoir of the park is created by a 118-foot tall (36 m) and 2.6-mile long dam (4.2 km), which goes by the name of John Martin Dam.

Colorado Parks and Wildlife officials released thirty black-footed ferrets into a prairie dog colony in the nearby Southern Planes Preserve in 2022.

== Climate ==
According to the Köppen Climate Classification system, John Martin Dam has a cold semi-arid climate, abbreviated "BSk" on climate maps. The hottest temperature recorded at John Martin Dam was 115 °F (46.1 °C) on July 20, 2019, while the coldest temperature recorded was −27 °F (−32.8 °C) on January 30, 1949, January 18–19, 1984 and February 15, 2021. The 115 °F (46.1 °C) reading is the highest reliably measured temperature ever recorded in the state of Colorado.

Climate data for John Martin Dam, Colorado, 1991–2020 normals, extremes 1941–present
Month	Jan	Feb	Mar	Apr	May	Jun	Jul	Aug	Sep	Oct	Nov	Dec	Year
Record high °F (°C)	79 (26)	83 (28)	90 (32)	95 (35)	103 (39)	111 (44)	115 (46)	111 (44)	106 (41)	99 (37)	87 (31)	79 (26)	115 (46)
Mean maximum °F (°C)	66.7 (19.3)	72.4 (22.4)	82.9 (28.3)	88.5 (31.4)	96.3 (35.7)	103.5 (39.7)	105.8 (41.0)	102.8 (39.3)	99.5 (37.5)	91.5 (33.1)	78.7 (25.9)	67.5 (19.7)	107.0 (41.7)
Mean daily maximum °F (°C)	46.3 (7.9)	50.3 (10.2)	60.8 (16.0)	69.0 (20.6)	78.7 (25.9)	90.4 (32.4)	94.7 (34.8)	92.2 (33.4)	84.8 (29.3)	71.7 (22.1)	58.1 (14.5)	46.5 (8.1)	70.3 (21.3)
Daily mean °F (°C)	31.3 (−0.4)	35.1 (1.7)	44.8 (7.1)	53.3 (11.8)	63.4 (17.4)	74.6 (23.7)	79.4 (26.3)	77.2 (25.1)	68.8 (20.4)	54.9 (12.7)	42.4 (5.8)	32.0 (0.0)	54.8 (12.6)
Mean daily minimum °F (°C)	16.3 (−8.7)	19.9 (−6.7)	28.9 (−1.7)	37.7 (3.2)	48.1 (8.9)	58.8 (14.9)	64.0 (17.8)	62.2 (16.8)	52.7 (11.5)	38.0 (3.3)	26.6 (−3.0)	17.5 (−8.1)	39.2 (4.0)
Mean minimum °F (°C)	−0.6 (−18.1)	2.5 (−16.4)	12.1 (−11.1)	23.0 (−5.0)	33.6 (0.9)	46.2 (7.9)	53.9 (12.2)	51.7 (10.9)	38.7 (3.7)	22.7 (−5.2)	9.1 (−12.7)	−0.6 (−18.1)	−6.7 (−21.5)
Record low °F (°C)	−27 (−33)	−27 (−33)	−22 (−30)	12 (−11)	21 (−6)	37 (3)	45 (7)	35 (2)	18 (−8)	−1 (−18)	−12 (−24)	−22 (−30)	−27 (−33)
Average precipitation inches (mm)	0.24 (6.1)	0.28 (7.1)	0.71 (18)	1.23 (31)	1.62 (41)	1.92 (49)	2.35 (60)	2.05 (52)	1.02 (26)	0.98 (25)	0.39 (9.9)	0.36 (9.1)	13.15 (334.2)
Average snowfall inches (cm)	1.7 (4.3)	2.4 (6.1)	1.4 (3.6)	0.2 (0.51)	0.0 (0.0)	0.0 (0.0)	0.0 (0.0)	0.0 (0.0)	0.0 (0.0)	0.2 (0.51)	0.9 (2.3)	2.9 (7.4)	9.7 (24.72)
Average precipitation days (≥ 0.01 in)	1.8	2.1	3.7	4.5	5.3	5.6	6.7	5.7	4.3	3.6	2.1	2.1	47.5
Average snowy days (≥ 0.1 in)	0.8	0.9	0.4	0.2	0.0	0.0	0.0	0.0	0.0	0.2	0.4	0.9	3.8
Source 1: NOAA
Source 2: National Weather Service
