= John Martin Reservoir =

Reservoir in Colorado, United States

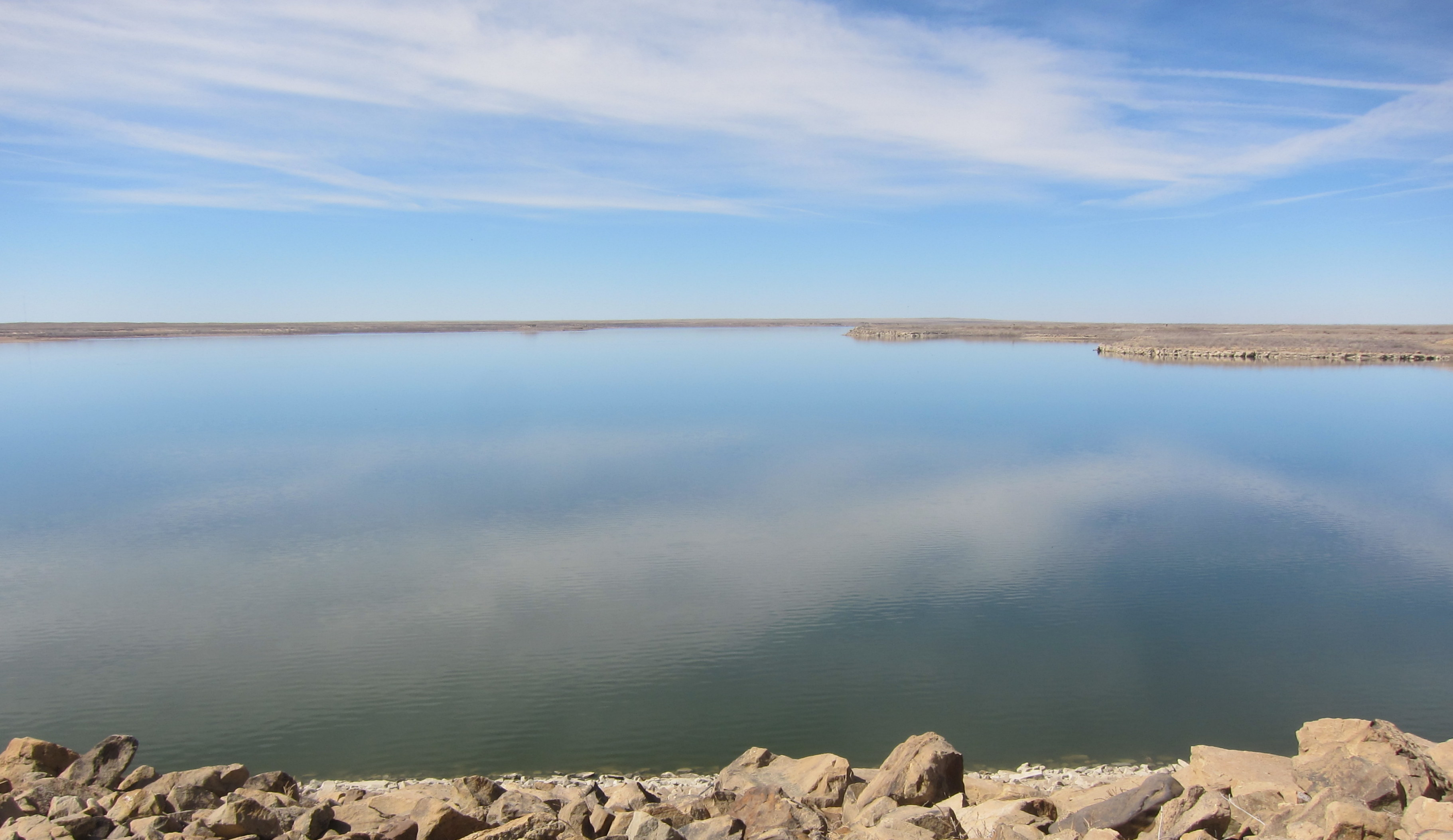
- View of the reservoir looking west from John Martin Dam (2014)

- Location within Colorado Location within the United States
- Location: Bent County, Colorado
- Coordinates: 38°04′23″N 103°01′41″W
- Type: Reservoir
- Primary inflows: Arkansas River
- Primary outflows: Arkansas River
- Catchment area: 18,915 sq mi (48,990 km^{2})
- Basin countries: United States
- Managing agency: U.S. Army Corps of Engineers
- Built: 1939
- First flooded: January 1943
- Surface area: 11,658 acres (47.18 km^{2})
- Average depth: 5–10 ft (1.5–3.0 m)
- Max. depth: 60 ft (18 m)
- Water volume: Full: 340,771 acre⋅ft (420,335,000 m^{3}); Current (Dec. 2015): 224,000 acre⋅ft (276,000,000 m^{3})
- Shore length^{1}: 22 mi (35 km)
- Surface elevation: Full: 3,852 ft (1,174 m); Current (Dec. 2015): 3,840 ft (1,170 m)
- Settlements: Caddoa, Hasty, Las Animas
- ^{1} Shore length is not a well-defined measure.

John Martin Reservoir is a reservoir on the Arkansas River in Bent County in southeastern Colorado. Built and managed by the U.S. Army Corps of Engineers, it is used for flood control, irrigation, and recreation. John Martin Reservoir State Park lies on its shore.

== History ==
In the 1930s, U.S. Representative from Colorado John Martin successfully advocated for legislation in the U.S. Congress approving the building of a reservoir on the Arkansas River for the purposes of flood control. Signed into law in 1939 by President Roosevelt, the legislation assigned the task of construction to the U.S. Army Corps of Engineers. The effort required the U.S. government to buy more than 20,000 acres (81 km^{2}) of land, including most of the town of Caddoa, and relocate 21 miles (34 km) of Santa Fe Railway track.

Construction of Caddoa Dam and Reservoir started in the fall of 1939. Rep. Martin died that year, and, in June 1940, both the dam and reservoir were renamed in his honor. Storage of water in the reservoir began in January 1943. The diversion of resources to fighting World War II caused delays in the project until 1946. The dam was finally completed in October 1948.

In 1935 the U.S. Army Corps established the Tucumcari District to develop the Conchas Project in Eastern New Mexico. At the conclusion of the construction of the Conchas Project the focus of the District moved to Caddoa, Colorado to construct the Caddoa Reservoir Project. The District staff relocated to Caddoa Colorado on December 4, 1939. At this time the District name was changed to the Caddoa District. In 1942 with the advent of World War Two the District made its final move to Albuquerque, New Mexico and was renamed the Albuquerque District which has remained the same since. At this time the focus of the district switched from Civil Works to Wartime activities which included work to facilitate the development of Los Alamos Laboratory and their development of atomic energy and its application to weapons.

In December 1948, the state governments of Colorado and Kansas signed the Arkansas River Compact, an agreement governing the two states' access to the river's water, including John Martin Reservoir. In 1980, the states developed a plan allocating 60% of the reservoir's water to Colorado and 40% to Kansas. Adherence to the Compact has been a recurrent source of controversy between the two states, serving as a primary factor in the decades-long water conflict litigation Kansas v. Colorado.

== Geography ==
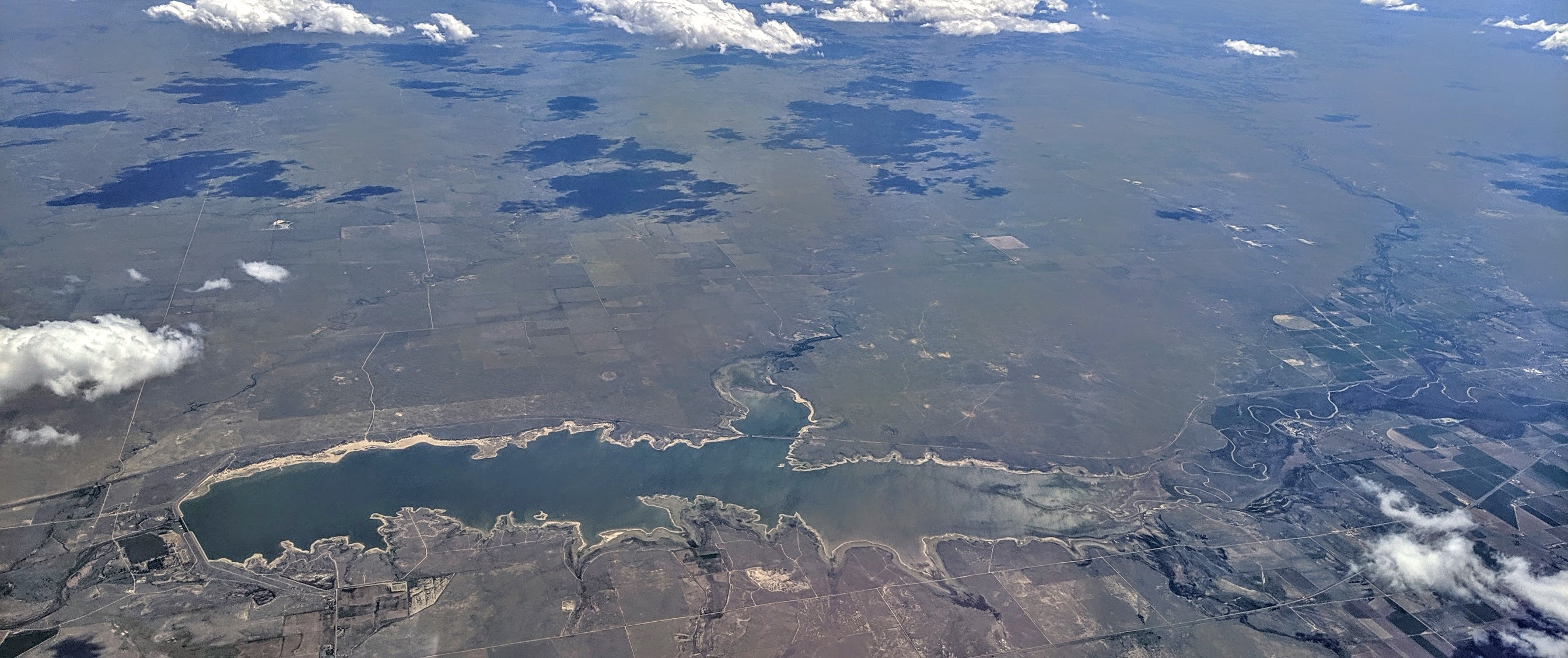
Aerial view from the north of John Martin Reservoir. Fort Lyon is at the lower far right.

John Martin Reservoir is located at 38°04′23″N 103°01′41″W (38.0730328, -103.0279951) at an elevation of 3,852 feet (1,174 m). It lies in southeastern Colorado in the Colorado Piedmont region of the Great Plains. The entirety of the reservoir lies within Bent County.

The reservoir is impounded at its eastern end by John Martin Dam. The dam is located at 38°04′00″N 102°56′14″W (38.0666741, -102.9371452) at an elevation of 3,852 feet (1,174 m). The Arkansas River is both the reservoir's primary inflow from the west and outflow to the east. Smaller tributaries include Rule Creek, which flows into the reservoir from the south, and Gageby Creek, which flows in from the north.

U.S. Route 50 runs generally east–west north of the reservoir. Colorado State Highway 183 runs north–south between U.S. 50 and Fort Lyon immediately northwest of the reservoir. A BNSF Railway line runs generally east–west along the reservoir's southern shoreline, crossing the southern arm fed by Rule Creek.

The city of Las Animas lies on the south bank of the Arkansas River 4 miles (6.4 km) west of the reservoir. Hasty, an unincorporated community, is located on U.S. 50 roughly 2 miles (3.2 km) north of the reservoir's eastern end. Caddoa, also unincorporated, lies immediately east of the dam.

=== Climate ===
According to the Köppen Climate Classification system, John Martin Dam has a cold semi-arid climate, abbreviated "BSk" on climate maps. The hottest temperature recorded at John Martin Dam was 115 °F (46.1 °C) on July 20, 2019, while the coldest temperature recorded was −27 °F (−32.8 °C) on January 30, 1949, January 18–19, 1984 and February 15, 2021. The 115 °F (46.1 °C) reading is the highest reliably measured temperature ever recorded in the state of Colorado.

Climate data for John Martin Dam, Colorado, 1991–2020 normals, extremes 1941–present
Month	Jan	Feb	Mar	Apr	May	Jun	Jul	Aug	Sep	Oct	Nov	Dec	Year
Record high °F (°C)	79 (26)	83 (28)	90 (32)	95 (35)	103 (39)	111 (44)	115 (46)	111 (44)	106 (41)	99 (37)	87 (31)	79 (26)	115 (46)
Mean maximum °F (°C)	66.7 (19.3)	72.4 (22.4)	82.9 (28.3)	88.5 (31.4)	96.3 (35.7)	103.5 (39.7)	105.8 (41.0)	102.8 (39.3)	99.5 (37.5)	91.5 (33.1)	78.7 (25.9)	67.5 (19.7)	107.0 (41.7)
Mean daily maximum °F (°C)	46.3 (7.9)	50.3 (10.2)	60.8 (16.0)	69.0 (20.6)	78.7 (25.9)	90.4 (32.4)	94.7 (34.8)	92.2 (33.4)	84.8 (29.3)	71.7 (22.1)	58.1 (14.5)	46.5 (8.1)	70.3 (21.3)
Daily mean °F (°C)	31.3 (−0.4)	35.1 (1.7)	44.8 (7.1)	53.3 (11.8)	63.4 (17.4)	74.6 (23.7)	79.4 (26.3)	77.2 (25.1)	68.8 (20.4)	54.9 (12.7)	42.4 (5.8)	32.0 (0.0)	54.8 (12.6)
Mean daily minimum °F (°C)	16.3 (−8.7)	19.9 (−6.7)	28.9 (−1.7)	37.7 (3.2)	48.1 (8.9)	58.8 (14.9)	64.0 (17.8)	62.2 (16.8)	52.7 (11.5)	38.0 (3.3)	26.6 (−3.0)	17.5 (−8.1)	39.2 (4.0)
Mean minimum °F (°C)	−0.6 (−18.1)	2.5 (−16.4)	12.1 (−11.1)	23.0 (−5.0)	33.6 (0.9)	46.2 (7.9)	53.9 (12.2)	51.7 (10.9)	38.7 (3.7)	22.7 (−5.2)	9.1 (−12.7)	−0.6 (−18.1)	−6.7 (−21.5)
Record low °F (°C)	−27 (−33)	−27 (−33)	−22 (−30)	12 (−11)	21 (−6)	37 (3)	45 (7)	35 (2)	18 (−8)	−1 (−18)	−12 (−24)	−22 (−30)	−27 (−33)
Average precipitation inches (mm)	0.24 (6.1)	0.28 (7.1)	0.71 (18)	1.23 (31)	1.62 (41)	1.92 (49)	2.35 (60)	2.05 (52)	1.02 (26)	0.98 (25)	0.39 (9.9)	0.36 (9.1)	13.15 (334.2)
Average snowfall inches (cm)	1.7 (4.3)	2.4 (6.1)	1.4 (3.6)	0.2 (0.51)	0.0 (0.0)	0.0 (0.0)	0.0 (0.0)	0.0 (0.0)	0.0 (0.0)	0.2 (0.51)	0.9 (2.3)	2.9 (7.4)	9.7 (24.72)
Average precipitation days (≥ 0.01 in)	1.8	2.1	3.7	4.5	5.3	5.6	6.7	5.7	4.3	3.6	2.1	2.1	47.5
Average snowy days (≥ 0.1 in)	0.8	0.9	0.4	0.2	0.0	0.0	0.0	0.0	0.0	0.2	0.4	0.9	3.8
Source 1: NOAA
Source 2: National Weather Service

== Hydrography ==
The surface area, surface elevation, and water volume of the reservoir fluctuate based on inflow and local climatic conditions. In terms of capacity, the Corps of Engineers vertically divides the reservoir into a set of pools based on volume and water level, and the reservoir is considered full when filled to the capacity of its recreation and conservation pool. When full, John Martin Reservoir has a surface area of 11,658 acres (47.18 km^{2}), a surface elevation of 3,852 feet (1,174 m), and a volume of 340,771 acre⋅ft (420,335,000 m^{3}). When filled to maximum capacity, it has a surface area of 20,516 acres (83.03 km^{2}), a surface elevation of 3,880 feet (1,180 m), and a volume of 788,104 acre⋅ft (972,112,000 m^{3}).

The streambed underlying the reservoir has an elevation of 3,765 feet (1,148 m). Since the reservoir's initial flooding, sedimentation has gradually accumulated on the reservoir bottom thus raising its elevation.

== Infrastructure ==
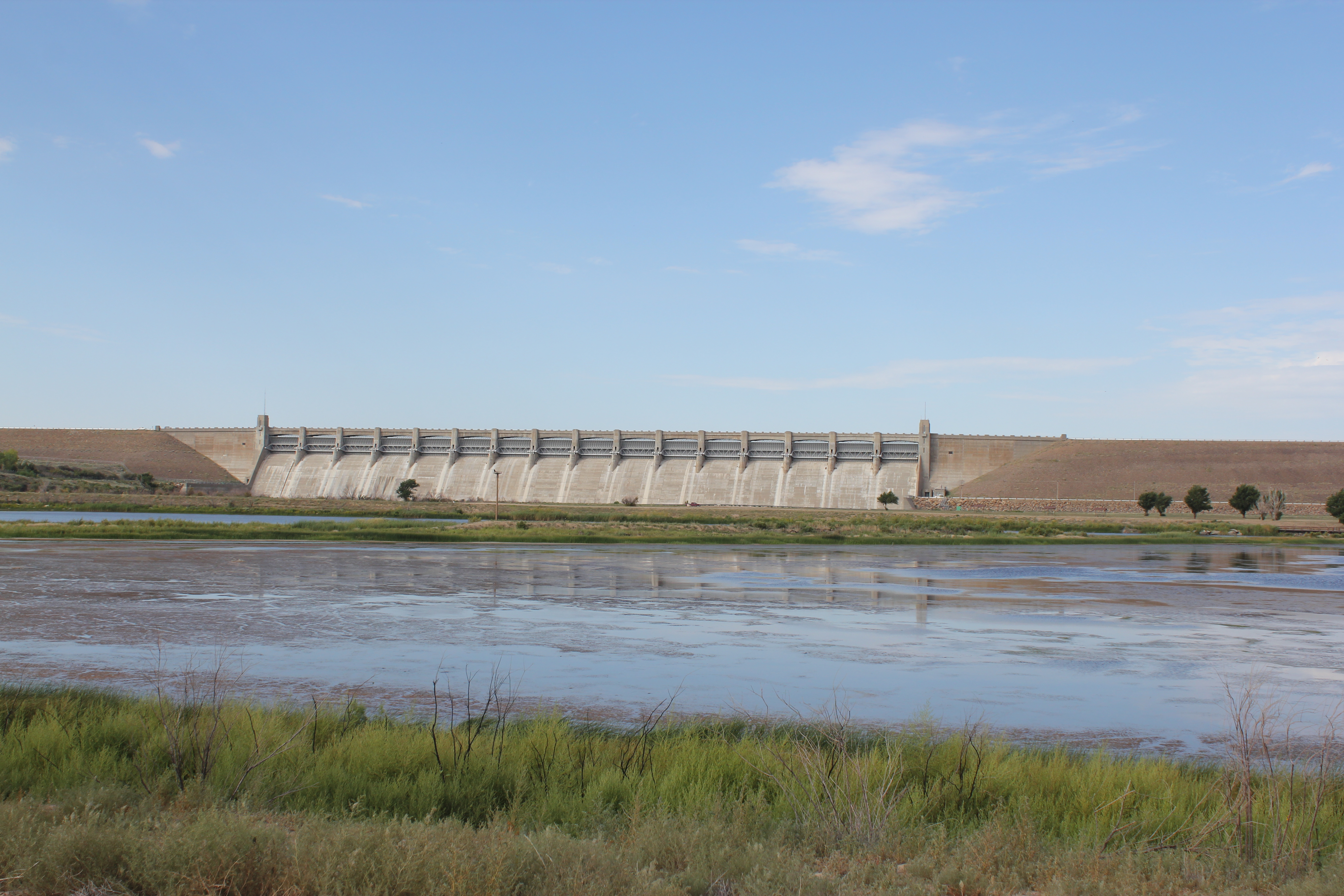
John Martin Dam (2013)

John Martin Dam is an earth-fill embankment dam that stands 118 feet (36 m) tall and 2.6 miles (4.2 km) long. A portion of the dam's midsection is a concrete spillway controlled by 16 radial gates which empty into the Arkansas River. When the reservoir is filled to its maximum capacity, the spillway has a discharge capacity of 660,000 cubic feet per second (19,000 m^{3}/s). When the reservoir is filled to the top of its flood control pool, the river outlet has a capacity of 16,300 cubic feet per second (460 m^{3}/s).

== Management ==
The Albuquerque District of the U.S. Army Corps of Engineers manages the dam and the reservoir for the purposes of flood control and irrigation, a shelter house as well as the Caddoa Disc Golf Course. The Corps also oversees 19,471 acres (78.80 km^{2}) adjoining the park as the USACE John Martin Reservoir Wildlife Area , a petroglyph site called Hicklin Springs as well as dispersed dinosaur track sites. Colorado Parks and Wildlife manages the reservoir surface and all recreational activities at the reservoir including John Martin Reservoir State Park.

== Parks and recreation ==
John Martin Reservoir State Park is located on the north shore of the reservoir's eastern end, and it extends east to include the area immediately below the dam. The park hosts boat ramps, camping facilities, a hiking trail, and wetland habitats. Below the dam is a small reservoir named Lake Hasty which includes a swimming beach.

John Martin Reservoir is open for sport fishing. Hunting is forbidden in the state park but permitted in the neighboring wildlife area.

=== Points of interest ===
A preserved 0.5-mile (0.80 km) section of the Santa Fe Trail lies north of the reservoir, commemorated by a historical marker placed by the Daughters of the American Revolution.

Fort Lyon National Cemetery is located immediately west of the reservoir.

Hicklin Springs Petroglyph Site located North of the reservoir

Boggsville Historic Site

Zebulon Pike Monument

Red Shin Hiking Trail

John Martin Dam Tours

== Wildlife ==
John Martin Reservoir is a productive warm water fishery, providing species including saugeye, wiper, white bass, crappie, and catfish. These fish are stocked as needed.

With 373 documented species of birds in Bent County, John Martin Reservoir is considered a premier birding area, including the Interior Least Tern, The Piping Plover and the Eastern Black Rail. Additionally, during winter months, bald eagles can be found throughout the area. During the winter of 2001–2002, 126 eagles were documented.

Other wildlife common in the area include deer, prairie dogs, rabbits, raccoons, and squirrels.

== See also ==
- List of largest reservoirs of Colorado
