= General Stratton =

General Stratton may refer to:

- James H. Stratton (1898–1984), U.S. Army brigadier general
- William Stratton (British Army officer) (1903–1989), British Army lieutenant general

== See also ==
- Attorney General Stratton (disambiguation)
