= Ninaview, Colorado =

Unincorporated community in Bent County, CO, USA

- Unincorporated community
- Location within Colorado Location within the United States
- Coordinates: 37°38′38″N 103°14′27″W
- Country: United States
- State: Colorado
- County: Bent
- Elevation: 4,433 ft (1,351 m)
- Time zone: UTC−7 (MST)
  - Summer (DST): UTC−6 (MDT)
- ZIP Code: 81054 (Las Animas)
- Area code: 719
- GNIS ID: 195900
- FIPS code: 08-53670

Ninaview is an unincorporated community in Bent County, Colorado, United States.

== History ==
The Ninaview post office was established in Bent County in 1915, moving to Las Animas County prior to 1917 and back to Bent County in 1918, remaining in operation until 1965. The community derives its name from Nina Verona Jones, the daughter of the first pair of settlers in the area. Donald Alan Johnston restored several buildings in the late 2000s and installed an amateur observatory on the site. Astronomy is favorable here due to low external light sources.

The U.S. Post Office at Las Animas (ZIP Code 81054) now serves Ninaview postal addresses.
