= Patricia M. Bricklin =

American psychologist and educator

Patrica M. Bricklin
- Born: 02/28/1932; Las Animas, Colorado
- Died: 12/21/2010, age 78; Wayne, Pennsylvania
- Occupation: Psychologist

Patricia Bricklin was a professor of Psychology in the Institute of Graduate Clinical Psychology at Widener University. She was President of the Pennsylvania Psychological Association. She was awarded the American Psychological Association Award for Distinguished Professional Contributions and the American Psychological Foundation Gold Medal Award for Life Achievement in the Practice of Psychology. The Pennsylvania Psychological Foundation annually awards the Patricia M. Bricklin Student Ethics Award to a student who lives in Pennsylvania or attends school in Pennsylvania for contributions to ethics or law in psychology. This award commemorates Bricklin's outstanding lifetime contributions as a pioneer, educator, program leader, advocate, and visionary.

== Biography ==
Bricklin grew up in Toledo, Ohio. She attended Johns Hopkins University where she earned her master's degree. She had difficulties gaining acceptance into graduate school for her doctorate due to her being female, but eventually she was admitted and completed her degree in the Department of Psychology at Temple University. Bricklin met her husband, psychologist Barry Bricklin, in school and they had four children together. Bricklin learned how to listen to people and the tone of their voices from running a call-in-radio show with her husband. Her experiences engaging with the public via the talk show motivated her to become a lobbyist and conduct research on ethical issues pertaining to the process of psychological evaluation.

== Representative Publication ==
Bricklin, P. M. (1970). Counseling parents of children with learning disabilities. The Reading Teacher, 23(4), 331-338.
