= Attorney General Stratton =

Attorney General Stratton may refer to:

- Hal Stratton (born 1950), Attorney General of New Mexico
- Wickliffe Stratton (1869–1936), Attorney General of Washington

== See also ==
- General Stratton (disambiguation)
