= Timber Culture Act =

1873 U.S. law

- Long title: An Act to encourage the Growth of Timber on western Prairies.
- Acronyms (colloquial): TCA
- Nicknames: Timber Culture Act of 1873
- Enacted by: the 42nd United States Congress
- Effective: March 3, 1873

Citations
- Public law: 42-277
- Statutes at Large: 17 Stat. 605c

Legislative history
- Signed into law by President Ulysses S. Grant on March 3, 1873

The Timber Culture Act was a follow-up act to the Homestead Act. The Timber Culture Act was passed by Congress in 1873. The act allowed homesteaders to get another 160 acres (65 ha) of land if they planted trees on one-fourth of the land, because the land was "almost one entire plain of grass, which is and ever must be useless to cultivating man." (qtd. in Daily Life on the 19th Century American Frontier by Aleesha White)

The primary impetus for the act was to alter the climate and ecology of the Great Plains. Scientists in the 19th century believed that substantial afforestation would cause an increase in rainfall, which would enable greater agricultural development. A second motivation was the need for timber on the frontier.

== Text of the Timber Culture Act ==
An Act to encourage the Growth of Timber on western Prairies.

Be it enacted by the Senate and House of Representatives of the United States of America in Congress assembled,
That any person who shall plant, protect, and keep in a healthy, growing condition for ten years forty acres of timber, the trees thereon not being more than twelve feet apart each way on any quarter-section of any of the public lands of the United States shall be entitled to a patent for the whole of said quarter-section at the expiration of said ten years, on making proof of such fact by not less than two credible witnesses; Provided, That only one quarter in any section shall be thus granted.

SECTION 2. That the person applying for the benefit of this act shall, upon application to the register of the land-office in which he or she is about to make such entry, make affidavit before said register or receiver that said entry is made for the cultivation of timber, and upon filing said affidavit with said register and receiver, and on payment of ten dollars, he or she shall thereupon be permitted to enter the quantity of land specified: Provided however, That no certificate shall be given or patent issue therefor until the expiration of at least ten years from the date of such entry; and if at the expiration of such time, or at any time within three years thereafter, the person making such entry, or if he or she be dead, his or her heirs or legal representatives, shall prove by two credible witnesses that he, she, or they have planted, and for not less than ten years have cultivated and protected such quantity and character of timber as aforesaid, they shall receive the patent for such quarter-section of land.

SECTION 3. That if at any time after the filing of said affidavit, and prior to the issuing of the patent for said land, it shall be proven after due notice to the party making such entry and claiming to cultivate such timber, to the satisfaction of the register of the land-office, that such person has abandoned or failed to cultivate, protect and keep in good condition such timber, then, and in that event, said land shall revert to the United States.

SECTION 4. That each and every person who, under the provisions of an act entitled "An act to secure homesteads to actual settlers on the public domain" approved May twentieth, eighteen hundred and sixty-two or any amendment thereto, having a homestead on said public domain, who, at the end of the third year of his or her residence thereon, shall have had under cultivation, for two years, one acre of timber, the trees thereon not being more than twelve feet apart each way, and in a good, thrifty condition, for each and every sixteen acres of said homestead, shall upon due proof of said fact by two credible witnesses receive his or her patent for said homestead.

SECTION 5. That no land acquired under provisions of this act, shall, in any event, become liable to the satisfaction of any debt or debts contracted prior to the issuing of patent therefore.

SECTION 6. That the commissioner of the general land-office is hereby required to prepare and issue such rules and regulations, consistent with this act, as shall be necessary and proper to carry its provisions into effect; and that the registers and the receivers of the several land-offices shall be entitled to receive the same compensation for any lands entered under the provisions of this that they are now entitled to receive when the same quantity of land is entered with money.

SECTION 7. That the fifth section of the act entitled "An act in addition to an act to punish crimes against the United States, and for other purposes" approved March third, eighteen hundred and fifty-seven, shall extend to all oaths, affirmations, and affidavits required or authorized by this act.

APPROVED, March 3, 1873.

== Explanation ==
160 acres (65 ha) of additional free land could be obtained if they set aside 40 acres (16 ha) to grow trees to solve the problem of lack of wood on the Great Plains. After planting the trees the land could only be completely obtained if it was occupied by the same family for at least 5 years. The act was passed to prevent abuse of the original Homestead Act in 1862. Later the amount of land that needed to be set aside for trees was reduced to 10 acres (4.0 ha). Any potential settler, including foreign immigrants, could claim this land under both this act and the Homestead Act provided the claimant had become a U.S. citizen by the time of proving up. Timber was needed to sell and use for building materials. This timber would provide them with wood for fires and building. It would also act as a wind break reducing the problem of the strong winds on the plains.

== See also ==
- George W. Swink, said to be the first holder of a timber certificate
