= George W. Swink =

American politician

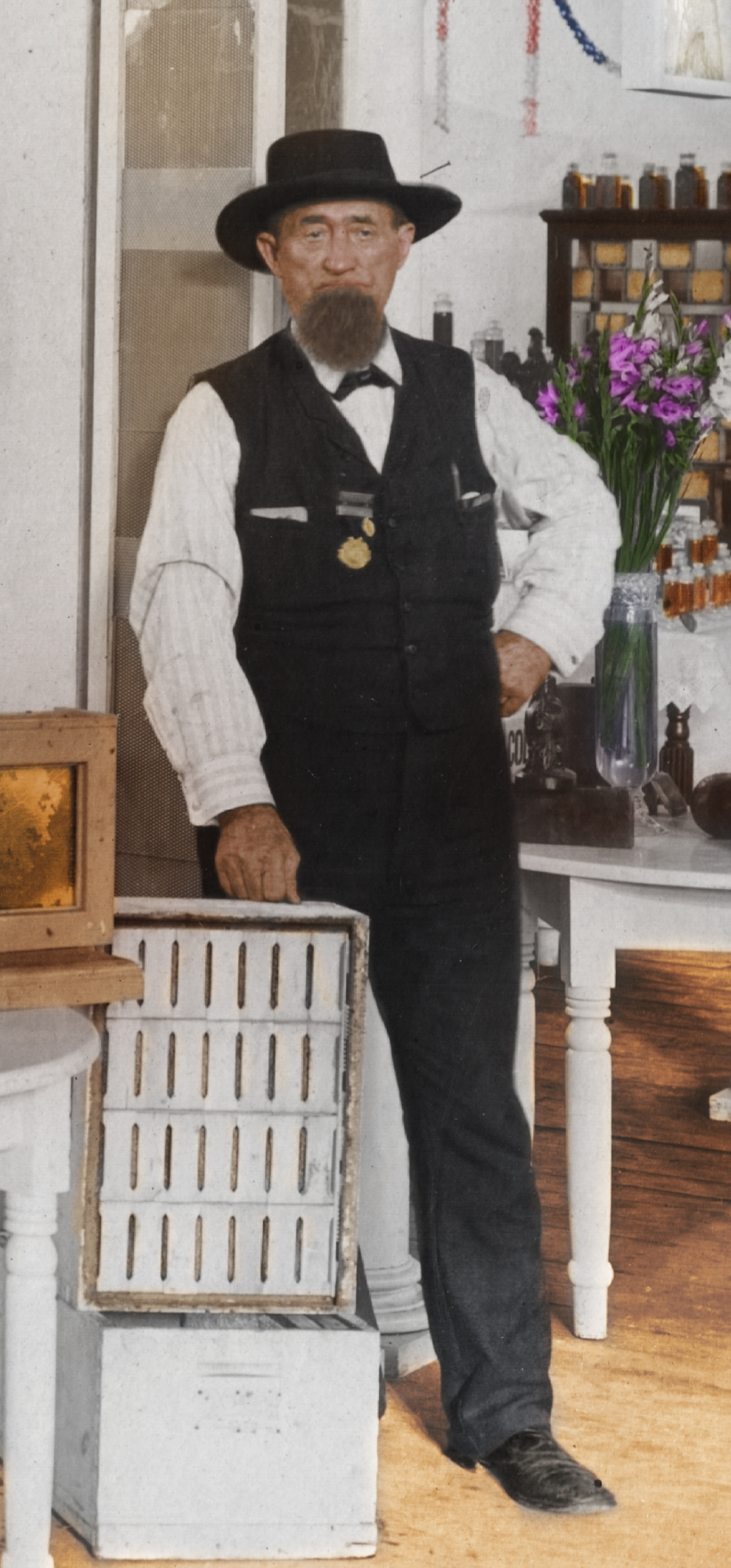
G.W.Swink in front of his exhibit showcasing Rocky Ford Honey at the 1904 World's Fair.

George Washington Swink, or G.W. Swink, (1836–1910) was a landowner and politician in Colorado and is said to have been the holder of the first timber claim certificate in the United States, issued by President Grover Cleveland on November 3, 1887.

== Biography ==
George W. Swink was born June 30, 1836, in Breckinridge County, Kentucky, and moved with his parents to Schuyler County, Illinois, when he was four. When a young man, he worked in a sawmill and then was a farmer and a "general merchandiser" in Bardolph, Illinois.

He moved into Bent County, Colorado, in 1871 and established a retail store and a cattle business with Asahel Russell. In 1873 he began the canal system in the area with the Rocky Ford Ditch, and he also helped develop the Catlin and Highlind canals. It was "the first community irrigation system in the valley, forever transforming Rocky Ford [Colorado] into a top crop-producing landscape."

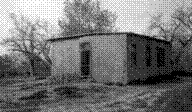
Swink store

Swink moved his stock of goods to Rocky Ford in 1876, partnering with Isaiah Denness, and eventually he had a thousand acres of land, which he obtained by homestead, pre-emption and purchase. He developed the watermelon and cantaloupe industry in Rocky Ford, and In 1878 he introduced honey bees. In 1879 he grew his first crop of alfalfa. Swink invented the cantaloupe crate, which replaced the barrels formerly used for shipping the fruit, and he began the Arkansas Valley Fair.

The entire town of Rocky Ford was moved from its prior location in 1884 when railroad tracks were laid through the townsite. Ford owned most of the new land where the new town was built. In 1899 he helped to found the American Crystal Sugar Factory, which remained in operation until 1979. In 1904 Swink set up and directed Colorado's agricultural and horticultural display at the World's Fair in St. Louis, Missouri. Swink, appointed postmaster of Rocky Ford in 1876, was the first mayor of the town after it was incorporated in 1887, and he was a state senator for two terms. He was one of the original three county commissioners when Otero County was formed.

In October 1855 he was married to Mary J. Cool, and they had eleven children—six boys and five girls. He died in 1910 at the age of seventy-four.

== Legacy ==
A state historical marker in Rocky Ford says this about the early town:

Its main asset, though, was Swink himself. He developed Rocky Ford's two main cash crops, melons and sugar beets; courted the town's largest corporation, the American Beet Sugar Company; and helped build the Rocky Ford Ditch, the spine of an extensive irrigation network. Swink's formula—land, transportation, industry, and water—represented prairie town-building at its best. He died in 1910, but his many gifts to this town still live on.

Swink began Watermelon Day in Rocky Ford: "The popularity of Watermelon Day started by Colorado Senator George Swink in 1878 gave rise to one of the longest-running festivals in Colorado."

The town of Swink, Colorado, was named after him. According to the town's website:

The people called a meeting to decide a new name for their town. George Swink was late in arriving, and as he entered the room the idea of Swink for the name of their settlement swept the audience. The name was approved [by postal authorities,] ... and thus George W. Swink was honored as the leading benefactor of the town.
