= McClave, Colorado =

Census-designated place in Bent County, CO, USA

- Census-designated place
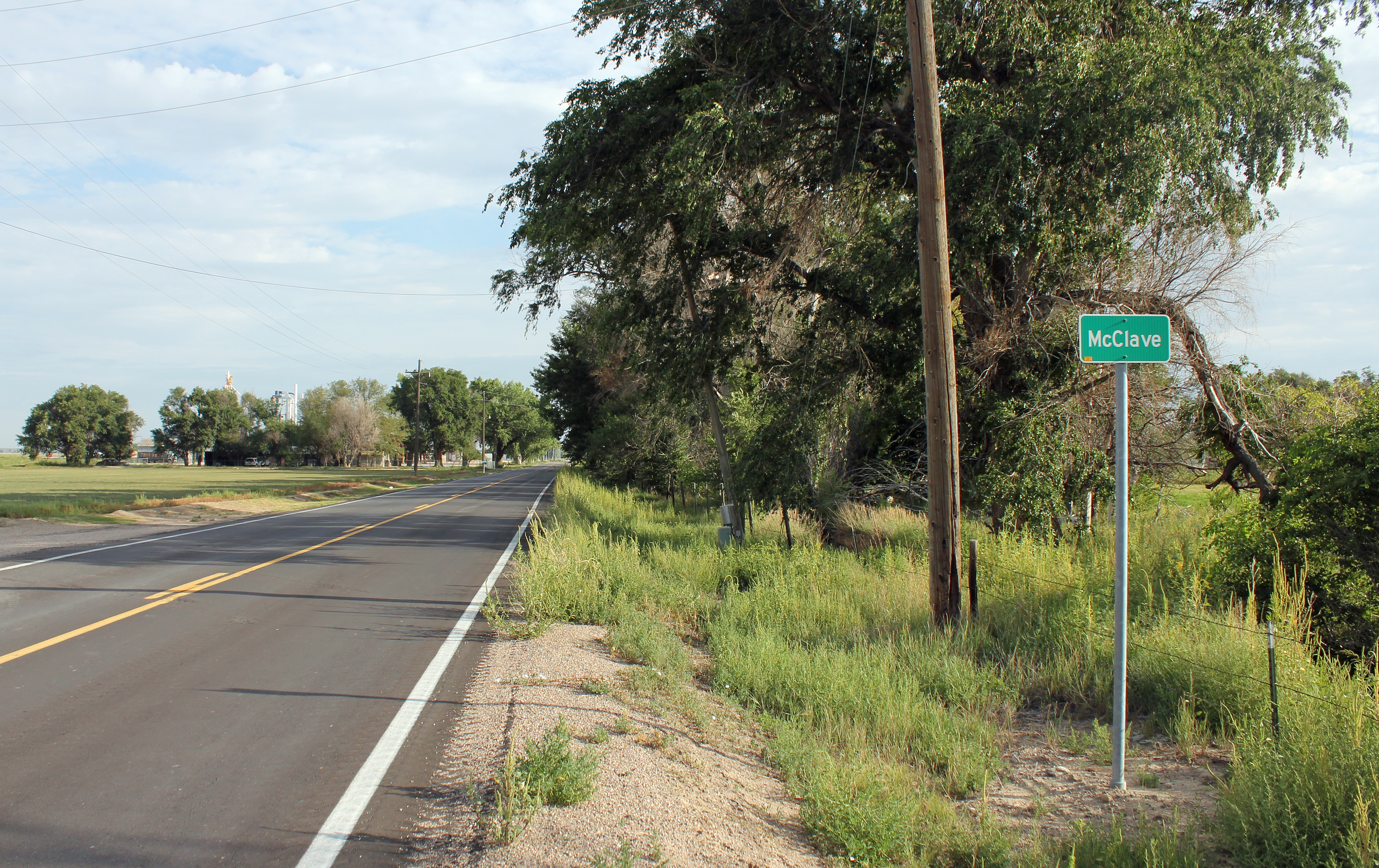
- Entering McClave from the south (2013)

- Location within Colorado Location within the United States
- Coordinates: 38°07′32″N 102°51′08″W
- Country: United States
- State: Colorado
- County: Bent

Area
  - Total: 1.914 sq mi (4.956 km^{2})
  - Land: 1.914 sq mi (4.956 km^{2})
- Elevation: 3,865 ft (1,178 m)

Population (2020)
  - Total: 725
  - Density: 379/sq mi (146/km^{2})
- Time zone: UTC−7 (MST)
  - Summer (DST): UTC−6 (MDT)
- ZIP Code: 81057
- Area code: 719
- FIPS code: 08-08-47235
- GNIS ID: 2805909

McClave is an unincorporated community in Bent County, Colorado, United States. The population was 725 at the 2020 census.

== History ==
The McClave post office has been in operation since 1908. The town was named after B. I. McClave, a pioneer settler. The McClave post office has the ZIP code 81057.

McClave's services include a store, gas station, post office, and a K-12 school with a large athletic field.

== Geography ==
The McClave CDP has an area of 1,225 acres (4.956 km^{2}), all land.

=== Climate ===
The Köppen Climate system classifies the weather as semi-arid, abbreviated as BSk.

Climate data for McClave, Colorado
Month	Jan	Feb	Mar	Apr	May	Jun	Jul	Aug	Sep	Oct	Nov	Dec	Year
Mean daily maximum °C (°F)	45 (7)	51 (11)	59 (15)	70 (21)	78 (26)	89 (32)	94 (34)	92 (33)	84 (29)	72 (22)	57 (14)	46 (8)	70 (21)
Mean daily minimum °C (°F)	14 (−10)	19 (−7)	26 (−3)	37 (3)	47 (8)	57 (14)	63 (17)	61 (16)	51 (11)	37 (3)	24 (−4)	16 (−9)	38 (3)
Average precipitation mm (inches)	0.4 (10)	0.4 (10)	0.8 (20)	1.4 (36)	2.3 (58)	2.2 (56)	2.4 (61)	2.1 (53)	1.2 (30)	0.9 (23)	0.5 (13)	0.5 (13)	15.3 (390)
Source: Weatherbase

== Demographics ==
The United States Census Bureau defined the McClave CDP for the United States Census 2020.

McClave CDP, Colorado
Year	Pop.	±%
2020	725	—
Source: United States Census Bureau

== See also ==
- Colorado census designated places
