= Swink, Colorado =

Town in Otero County, Colorado, United States

- Town
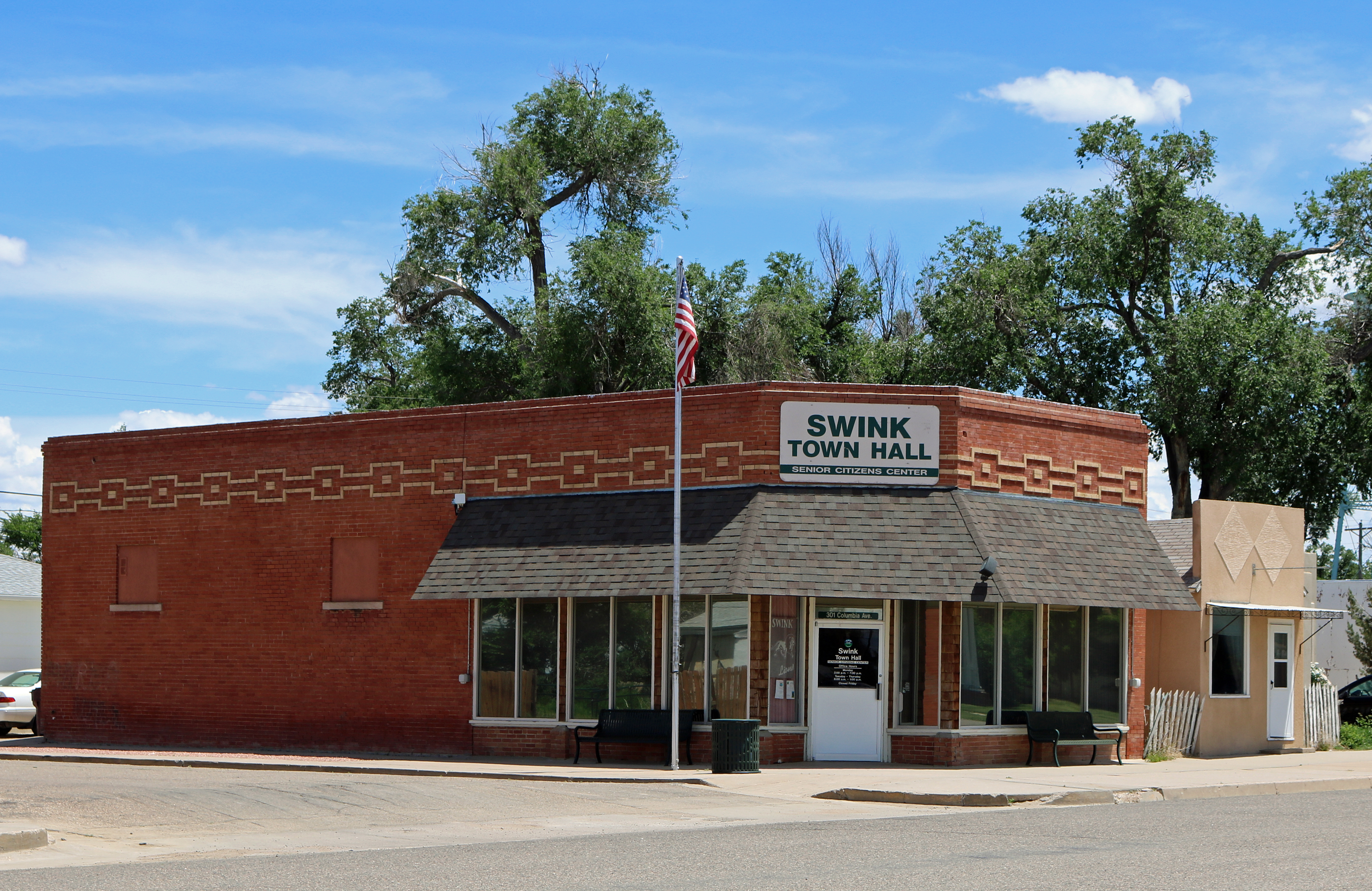
- Swink town hall (2017)

- Location of Swink in Otero County, Colorado.
- Coordinates: 38°0′51″N 103°37′33″W
- Country: United States
- State: Colorado
- County: Otero County
- Incorporated: June 6, 1906

Government
  - Type: Statutory Town

Area
  - Total: 0.28 sq mi (0.73 km^{2})
  - Land: 0.28 sq mi (0.73 km^{2})
  - Water: 0 sq mi (0.00 km^{2})
- Elevation: 4,121 ft (1,256 m)

Population (2020)
  - Total: 604
  - Density: 2,100/sq mi (830/km^{2})
- Time zone: UTC-7 (Mountain (MST))
  - Summer (DST): UTC-6 (MDT)
- ZIP code: 81077 (PO Box)
- Area code: 719
- FIPS code: 08-75970
- GNIS feature ID: 2413358
- Website: Official website

Swink is a Statutory Town in Otero County, Colorado, United States. The population was 604 at the 2020 census.

== History ==
A post office called Swink has been in operation since 1906. The community was named after George W. Swink, a Colorado politician.

== Demographics ==
Historical population
| Census | Pop. | Note | %± |
|---|---|---|---|
| 1910 | 310 | | — |
| 1920 | 465 | | 50.0% |
| 1930 | 418 | | −10.1% |
| 1940 | 374 | | −10.5% |
| 1950 | 336 | | −10.2% |
| 1960 | 348 | | 3.6% |
| 1970 | 381 | | 9.5% |
| 1980 | 668 | | 75.3% |
| 1990 | 584 | | −12.6% |
| 2000 | 696 | | 19.2% |
| 2010 | 617 | | −11.4% |
| 2020 | 604 | | −2.1% |
U.S. Decennial Census

As of the census of 2000, there were 696 people, 278 households, and 199 families residing in the town. The population density was 2,584.6 inhabitants per square mile (997.9/km^{2}). There were 291 housing units at an average density of 1,080.6 per square mile (417.2/km^{2}). The racial makeup of the town was 88.79% White, 0.43% African American, 1.01% Native American, 0.86% Asian, 7.18% from other races, and 1.72% from two or more races. Hispanic or Latino of any race were 20.55% of the population.

There were 278 households, out of which 34.5% had children under the age of 18 living with them, 60.1% were married couples living together, 8.3% had a female householder with no husband present, and 28.1% were non-families. 25.9% of all households were made up of individuals, and 15.8% had someone living alone who was 65 years of age or older. The average household size was 2.48 and the average family size was 2.99.

In the town, the population was spread out, with 26.7% under the age of 18, 6.3% from 18 to 24, 26.4% from 25 to 44, 24.9% from 45 to 64, and 15.7% who were 65 years of age or older. The median age was 39 years. For every 100 females, there were 98.9 males. For every 100 females age 18 and over, there were 96.2 males.

The median income for a household in the town was $36,094, and the median income for a family was $46,667. Males had a median income of $36,806 versus $25,694 for females. The per capita income for the town was $19,353. About 8.4% of families and 10.8% of the population were below the poverty line, including 9.6% of those under age 18 and 13.3% of those age 65 or over.

== Transportation ==
Swink has been incorporated in Colorado's Bustang network. It is part of the Lamar-Pueblo-Colorado Springs line.

== See also ==
- List of municipalities in Colorado
