= Bent County Courthouse and Jail =

- U.S. National Register of Historic Places
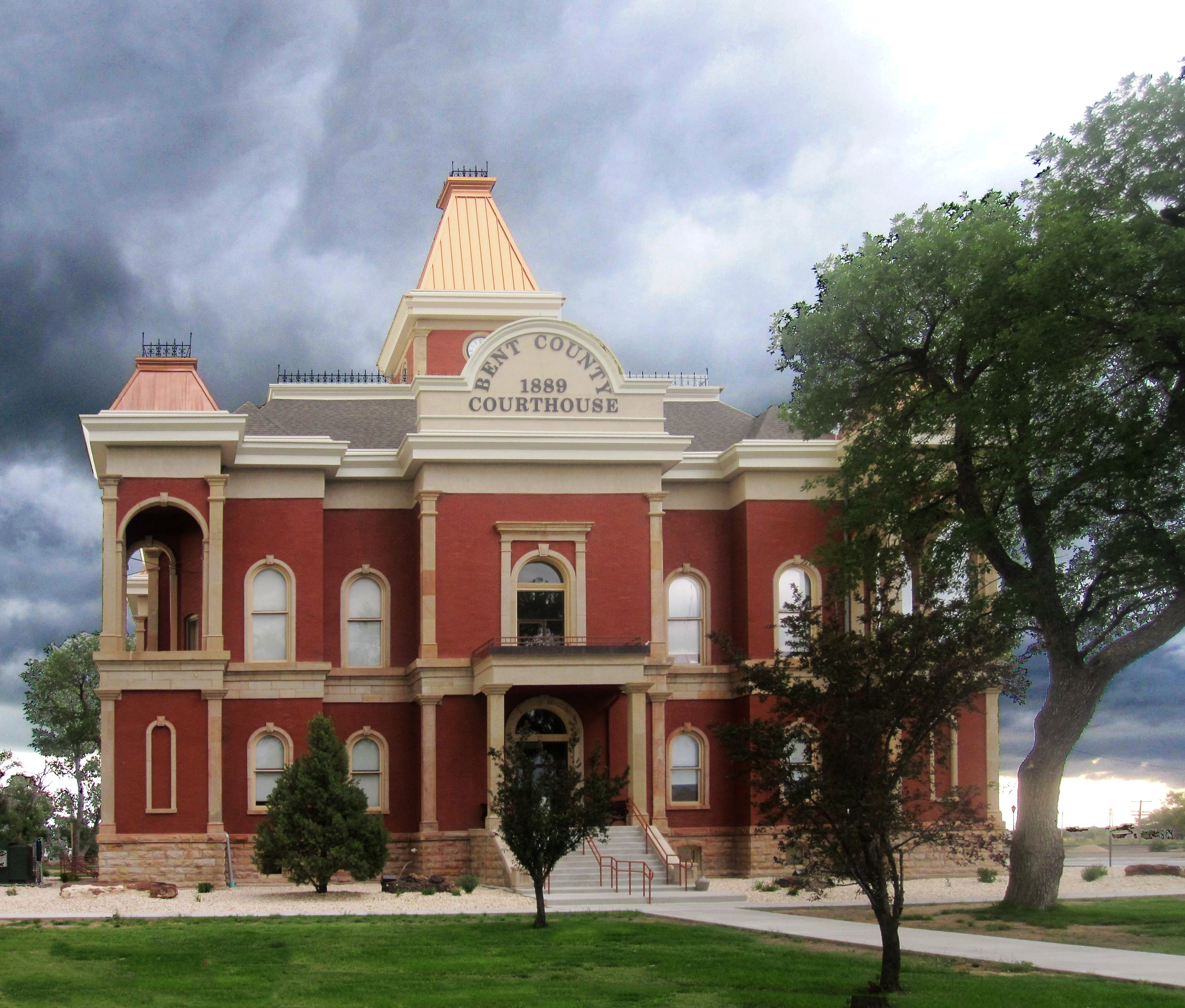

- Location within Colorado Location within the United States
- Location: 725 Carson Ave., Las Animas, Colorado
- Coordinates: 38°3′51″N 103°13′12″W
- Area: 3 acres (1.2 ha)
- Built: 1887
- Built by: Holmberg Bros.; Reilly, M.F. & B. Bradley
- Architectural style: Victorian Institutional
- NRHP reference No.: 76000546
- Added to NRHP: January 2, 1976

The Bent County Courthouse and Jail, of Bent County, Colorado, at 725 Bent Ave. in Las Animas, was built in 1887. It was listed on the National Register of Historic Places in 1976; the listing included two contributing buildings.

The courthouse building was built and furnished for a total of $58,429, during 1886–1889. Its architecture is described positively in its NRHP nomination.

The NRHP listing includes also the 1902 Bent County Jail, a 30-by-40-foot (9.1 m × 12.2 m) two-story brick building, and a brick garage and another brick extension building.

== History ==
1886 Bent County decided that a courthouse must be built, and in 1887 James Jones a resident of the county sold his plot of land. The land was sold for a dollar under a condition that the land would be used for the Bent County Courthouse. The Holmberg Brothers architectural firm made the plans for the Bent County Courthouse and on July 4, 1887, construction began. The original courthouse burned down January 10, 1888 and was restored the next year. The new building that stands today is a two-story red brick building with an elevated basement. Built in a Victorian style with the addition of Romanesque arches the Courthouse is symmetrical with reassessed bays but is missing its original iron cresting. The Courthouse also features rough sandstone blocks that add a beige trim. The building was furnished with antique oak furniture and opened March 12, 1889. 23 years later Bent County added a jail next to the courthouse. Similar to the Courthouse, the Jail was a two-story red brick structure however built in a Classical Revival style. By the 1990s, the jail no longer met federal standards and closed in 2000. The Bent County Courthouse is now the longest standing functional Courthouse in Colorado.
