= Caddoa Creek =

Stream in Colorado, U.S.

Coordinates: 38°04′37″N 102°54′15″W

Caddoa Creek is a stream in the U.S. state of Colorado.

Caddoa Creek derives its name from the Caddo Indians, who camped near its banks.

== See also ==
- List of rivers of Colorado
