= Bent County, Colorado =

County in Colorado, United States

- County
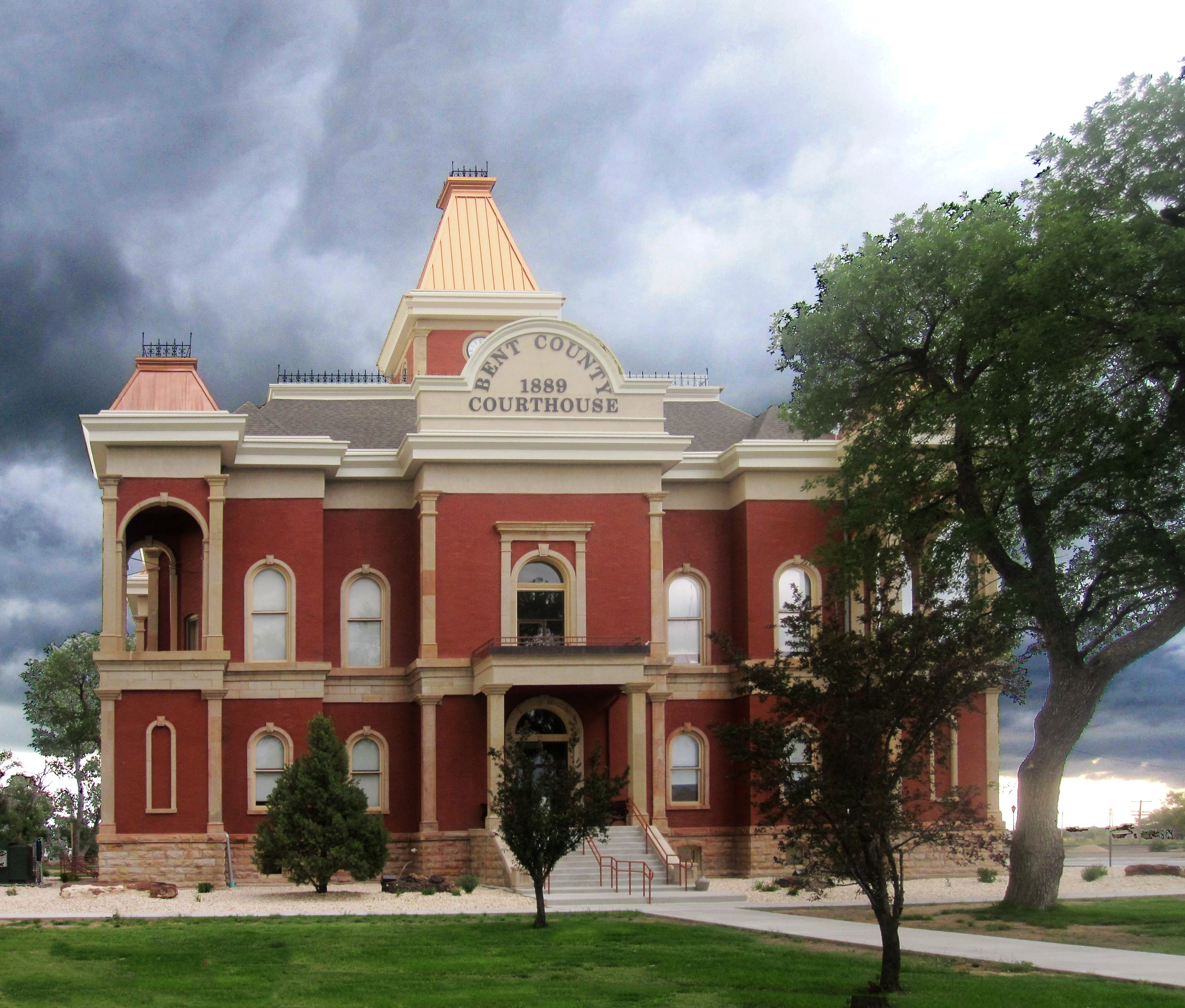
- Bent County Courthouse in Las Animas

- Location within the U.S. state of Colorado
- Coordinates: 37.95°N 103.08°W
- Country: United States
- State: Colorado
- Founded: February 6, 1874
- Named for: William Bent
- Seat: Las Animas
- Largest city: Las Animas

Area
  - Total: 1,541 sq mi (3,990 km^{2})
  - Land: 1,513 sq mi (3,920 km^{2})
  - Water: 28 sq mi (73 km^{2}) 1.8%

Population (2020)
  - Total: 5,650
  - Estimate (2025): 5,716 ▲
  - Density: 3.73/sq mi (1.44/km^{2})
- Time zone: UTC−7 (Mountain)
  - Summer (DST): UTC−6 (MDT)
- Congressional district: 4th
- Website: www.bentcounty.net

Bent County is a county located in the U.S. state of Colorado. As of the 2020 census, its population was 5,650. The county seat and only incorporated municipality is Las Animas. The county is named in honor of frontier trader William Bent.

== History ==
As Colorado experienced population growth following the American Civil War, the government had to be closer to the people for commerce and justice to be better served in growing communities. Territorial Bent County was created in February 1870, followed by Greenwood County the following month. The June 1, 1870, Federal Census was several months away and plans were being made to apply for statehood. On February 2, 1874, Grand County and Elbert County were formed. On February 6, 1874, Greenwood County was dissolved and divided between Bent and Elbert Counties. At the time of this annexation, Bent County included a large portion of southeastern Colorado. In 1889, Bent County acquired its current borders when it was partitioned to create Cheyenne, Lincoln, Kiowa, Otero, and Prowers Counties.

== Geography ==
According to the U.S. Census Bureau, the county has a total area of 1,541 square miles (3,990 km^{2}), of which 28 square miles (73 km^{2}) (1.8%) are covered by water.

=== Adjacent counties ===
- Kiowa County - north
- Prowers County - east
- Baca County - southeast
- Las Animas County - southwest
- Otero County - west

=== Major highways ===
- U.S. Highway 50
- State Highway 101
- State Highway 109
- State Highway 194
- State Highway 196

=== State protected area ===
- John Martin Reservoir State Park

=== Trails and byway ===
- American Discovery Trail
- Santa Fe National Historic Trail
- Santa Fe Trail National Scenic Byway

== Demographics ==
Historical population
Census	Pop.	Note	%±
1870	592		—
1880	1,654		179.4%
1890	1,313		−20.6%
1900	3,049		132.2%
1910	5,043		65.4%
1920	9,705		92.4%
1930	9,134		−5.9%
1940	9,653		5.7%
1950	8,775		−9.1%
1960	7,419		−15.5%
1970	6,493		−12.5%
1980	5,945		−8.4%
1990	5,048		−15.1%
2000	5,998		18.8%
2010	6,499		8.4%
2020	5,650		−13.1%
2025 (est.)	5,716	▲	1.2%
U.S. Decennial Census; 1790-1960 1900-1990; 1990-2000 2010-2020

=== 2020 census ===
As of the 2020 census, the county had a population of 5,650. Of the residents, 16.0% were under the age of 18 and 18.2% were 65 years of age or older; the median age was 42.3 years. For every 100 females there were 162.5 males, and for every 100 females age 18 and over there were 181.1 males. 0.0% of residents lived in urban areas and 100.0% lived in rural areas.

Bent County, Colorado – Racial and ethnic composition Note: the US Census treats Hispanic/Latino as an ethnic category. This table excludes Latinos from the racial categories and assigns them to a separate category. Hispanics/Latinos may be of any race.
Race / Ethnicity (NH = Non-Hispanic)	Pop 2000	Pop 2010	Pop 2020	% 2000	% 2010	% 2020
White alone (NH)	3,794	3,832	3,315	63.25%	58.96%	58.67%
Black or African American alone (NH)	208	491	255	3.47%	7.56%	4.51%
Native American or Alaska Native alone (NH)	63	91	90	1.05%	1.40%	1.59%
Asian alone (NH)	31	56	39	0.52%	0.86%	0.69%
Pacific Islander alone (NH)	0	4	0	0.00%	0.06%	0.00%
Other race alone (NH)	0	4	8	0.00%	0.06%	0.14%
Mixed race or Multiracial (NH)	88	36	183	1.47%	0.55%	3.24%
Hispanic or Latino (any race)	1,814	1,985	1,760	30.24%	30.54%	31.15%
Total	5,998	6,499	5,650	100.00%	100.00%	100.00%

The racial makeup of the county was 67.8% White, 4.5% Black or African American, 2.9% American Indian and Alaska Native, 0.9% Asian, 0.0% Native Hawaiian and Pacific Islander, 15.3% from some other race, and 8.6% from two or more races. Hispanic or Latino residents of any race comprised 31.2% of the population.

There were 1,805 households in the county, of which 28.8% had children under the age of 18 living with them and 27.4% had a female householder with no spouse or partner present. About 33.6% of all households were made up of individuals and 16.5% had someone living alone who was 65 years of age or older.

There were 2,136 housing units, of which 15.5% were vacant. Among occupied housing units, 64.4% were owner-occupied and 35.6% were renter-occupied. The homeowner vacancy rate was 2.5% and the rental vacancy rate was 5.3%.

=== 2000 census ===
At the 2000 census, 5,998 people, 2,003 households, and 1,388 families resided in the county. The population density was 4 people per square mile (1.5 people/km^{2}). The 2,366 housing units had an average density of 2 per square mile (0.77/km^{2}). The racial makeup of the county was 79.53% White, 3.65% Black or African American, 2.23% Native American, 0.57% Asian, 10.25% from other races, and 3.77% from two or more races. About 30.24% of the population were Hispanics or Latinos of any race.

Of the 2,003 households, 32.5% had children under 18 living with them, 53.5% were married couples living together, 11.4% had a female householder with no husband present, and 30.7% were not families. About 27.2% of households were one person and 12.2% were one person 65 or older. The average household size was 2.53 and the average family size was 3.07.

The age distribution was 23.8% under 18, 9.3% from 18 to 24, 29.2% from 25 to 44, 21.8% from 45 to 64, and 15.9% 65 or older. The median age was 37 years. For every 100 females, there were 129.0 males. For every 100 females 18 and over, there were 138.7 males.

The median income for a household was $28,125 and for a family was $34,096. Males had a median income of $22,755 versus $24,261 for females. The per capita income for the county was $13,567. About 16.6% of families and 19.5% of the population were below the poverty line, including 27.4% of those under 18 and 13.0% of those 65 or over.

=== Census-designated places ===
- Hasty
- McClave

== Politics ==
Bent is a strongly Republican county, although it is less so than the counties to its east. The last Democrat to carry Bent County was Bill Clinton in 1996, although Michael Dukakis in 1988 was the last to gain a majority.

United States presidential election results for Bent County, Colorado
Year	Republican		Democratic		Third party(ies)	
Year	No.	%	No.	%	No.	%
1880	174	41.23%	242	57.35%	6	1.42%
1884	382	44.26%	446	51.68%	35	4.06%
1888	1,338	51.58%	1,074	41.40%	182	7.02%
1892	162	40.30%	0	0.00%	240	59.70%
1896	197	24.63%	591	73.88%	12	1.50%
1900	569	50.49%	546	48.45%	12	1.06%
1904	812	63.94%	416	32.76%	42	3.31%
1908	915	50.72%	819	45.40%	70	3.88%
1912	420	21.76%	730	37.82%	780	40.41%
1916	833	34.80%	1,473	61.53%	88	3.68%
1920	1,584	60.67%	937	35.89%	90	3.45%
1924	1,511	54.14%	804	28.81%	476	17.05%
1928	1,957	72.13%	741	27.31%	15	0.55%
1932	1,327	39.58%	1,948	58.10%	78	2.33%
1936	1,299	40.84%	1,821	57.25%	61	1.92%
1940	1,899	51.67%	1,759	47.86%	17	0.46%
1944	1,556	51.51%	1,456	48.20%	9	0.30%
1948	1,296	43.43%	1,658	55.56%	30	1.01%
1952	1,950	59.40%	1,317	40.12%	16	0.49%
1956	1,718	57.25%	1,283	42.75%	0	0.00%
1960	1,671	57.54%	1,228	42.29%	5	0.17%
1964	937	34.76%	1,737	64.43%	22	0.82%
1968	1,228	47.47%	1,126	43.53%	233	9.01%
1972	1,525	64.29%	787	33.18%	60	2.53%
1976	1,156	46.61%	1,268	51.13%	56	2.26%
1980	1,206	51.76%	894	38.37%	230	9.87%
1984	1,314	59.75%	859	39.06%	26	1.18%
1988	1,032	47.62%	1,088	50.21%	47	2.17%
1992	759	33.63%	985	43.64%	513	22.73%
1996	917	41.70%	1,046	47.57%	236	10.73%
2000	1,096	55.83%	783	39.89%	84	4.28%
2004	1,338	62.09%	785	36.43%	32	1.48%
2008	1,077	56.09%	799	41.61%	44	2.29%
2012	1,075	55.36%	815	41.97%	52	2.68%
2016	1,188	61.65%	590	30.62%	149	7.73%
2020	1,503	66.09%	732	32.19%	39	1.72%
2024	1,496	68.34%	645	29.47%	48	2.19%

United States Senate election results for Bent County, Colorado2
Year	Republican		Democratic		Third party(ies)	
Year	No.	%	No.	%	No.	%
2020	1,488	65.96%	702	31.12%	66	2.93%

United States Senate election results for Bent County, Colorado3
Year	Republican		Democratic		Third party(ies)	
Year	No.	%	No.	%	No.	%
2022	1,104	60.99%	640	35.36%	66	3.65%

Colorado Gubernatorial election results for Bent County
Year	Republican		Democratic		Third party(ies)	
Year	No.	%	No.	%	No.	%
2022	1,091	52.86%	627	30.38%	346	16.76%

== Communities ==
=== Cities ===
- Las Animas

=== Census-designated places ===
- Hasty
- McClave

=== Unincorporated places ===
- Able
- Boggsville
- Caddoa
- Fort Lyon
- Marlman
- Melina
- Ninaview
- Prowers

== Gallery ==
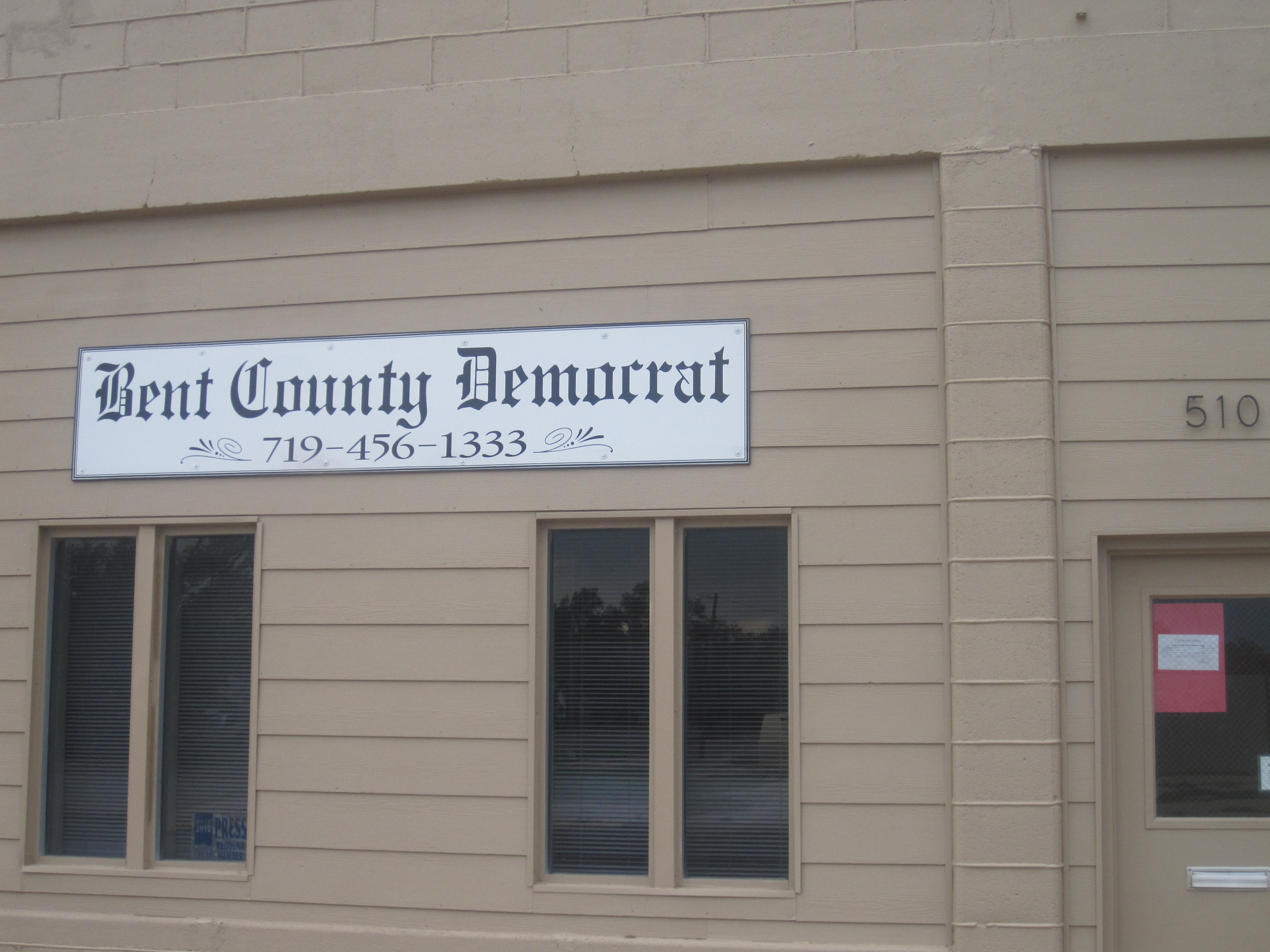
Bent County Democrat newspaper in Las Animas

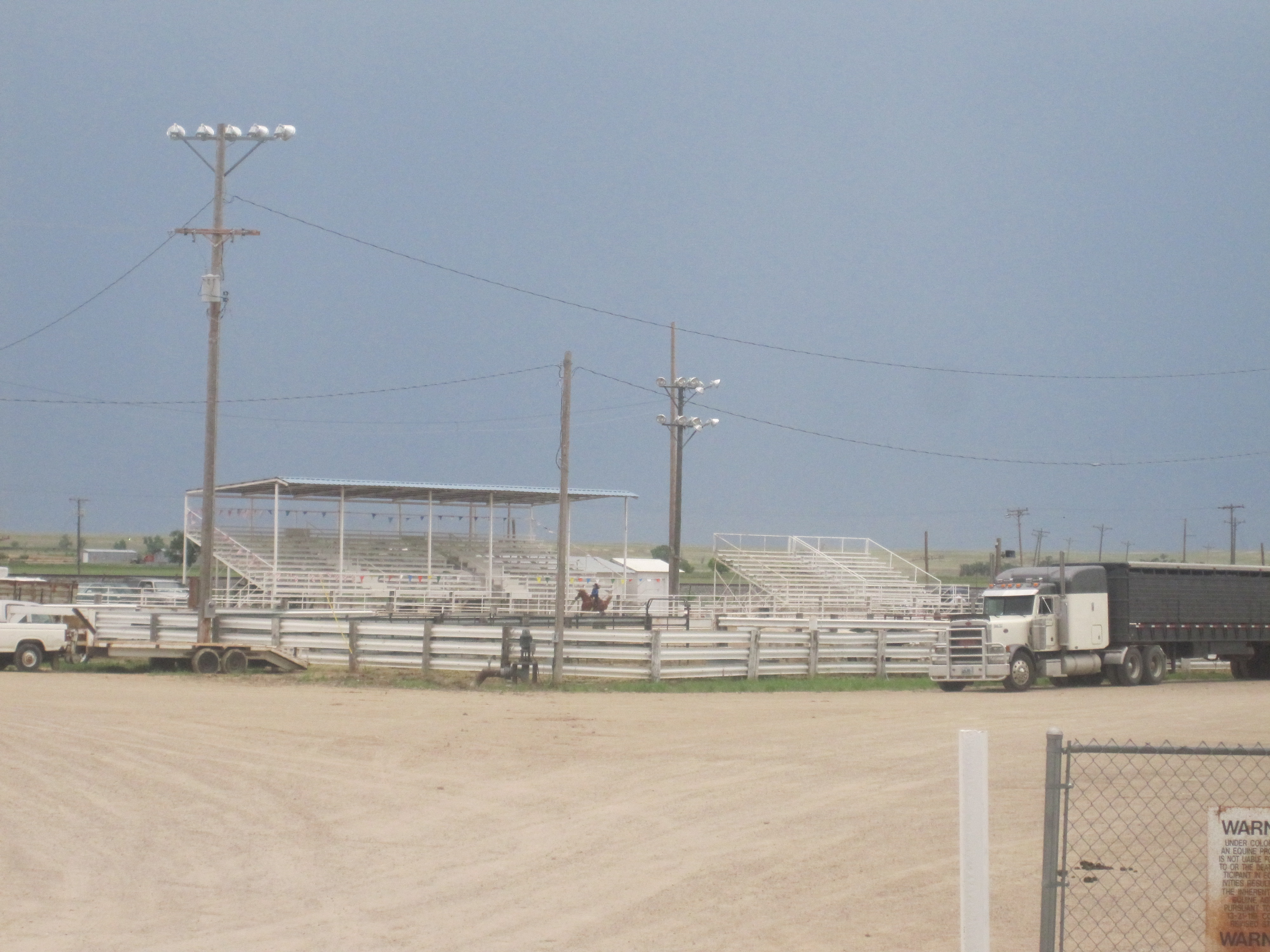
Bent County rodeo arena

== See also ==
- Bibliography of Colorado
- Geography of Colorado
- History of Colorado
  - Arapahoe County, Kansas Territory
  - Arrappahoe County, Jefferson Territory
  - Arapahoe County, Colorado Territory
  - Greenwood County, Colorado Territory
  - George W. Swink, retailer and cattleman
  - National Register of Historic Places listings in Bent County, Colorado
- Index of Colorado-related articles
- List of Colorado-related lists
  - List of counties in Colorado
- Outline of Colorado
