= James H. Stratton =

American general (1898–1984)

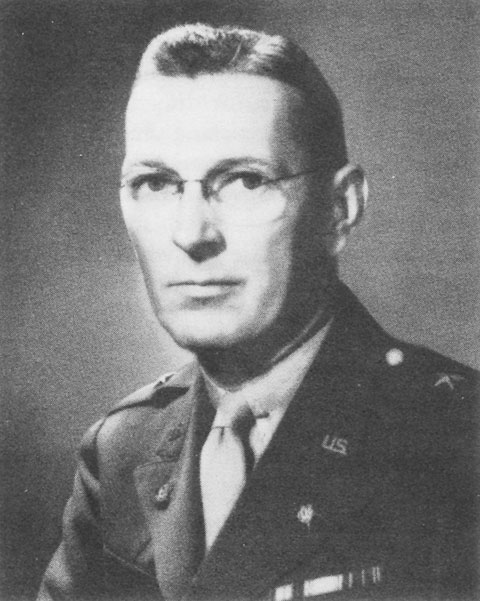
- James H. Stratton in 1944
- Born: 7 June 1898; Stonington, Connecticut, United States
- Died: 16 March 1984 (aged 85); Washington, D.C., United States
- Burial place: Arlington National Cemetery, Virginia, United States
- Children: 4
- Military career
- Allegiance: United States
- Branch: United States Army
- Service years: 1917–1949
- Rank: Brigadier General
- Service number: 0-12656
- Units: Field Artillery Branch; Corps of Engineers
- Conflicts: World War I; World War II; Normandy campaign; Northern France Campaign; Rhineland Campaign; Ardennes-Alsace Campaign
- Awards: Army Distinguished Service Medal; Legion of Merit

Brigadier General James Hobson Stratton (7 June 1898 − 16 March 1984) was a United States Army officer who served in both World War I and World War II. Between the wars he was involved in the construction of the Conchas Dam and the John Martin Reservoir. During World War II he was the Chief of Engineering in the Office of Chief of Engineers and the Assistant Chief of Staff (G-4) of Communications Zone in the European Theater of Operations, United States Army (ETOUSA), the staff officer responsible for logistics planning. After the war he became a partner in Tippetts-Abbett-McCarthy-Stratton, a consulting engineering firm in New York, and directed the construction of the Tarbela Dam in Pakistan, the world's largest embankment dam, and the design of the Eisenhower Tunnel, the highest tunnel in the United States.

== Early life ==
James Hobson Stratton was born in Stonington, Connecticut, on 7 June 1898, the son of William Stratton and his wife Emma née Symington, a pair of immigrants from Northern Ireland. When he was a boy, the family moved to Paterson, New Jersey, where he attended public schools. After graduating from high school he worked in New York City by day and attended evening classes at Columbia University. His education was interrupted when the United States declared war on Germany in April 1917, and he enlisted in the New Jersey National Guard. He was accidentally shot in the chest by one of his fellow soldiers, which he would later claim was the closest he came to a shot fired in anger in his whole career. He sat the competitive examination to the United States Military Academy (USMA) at West Point, New York, which he entered on 14 June 1918.

== Between the wars ==
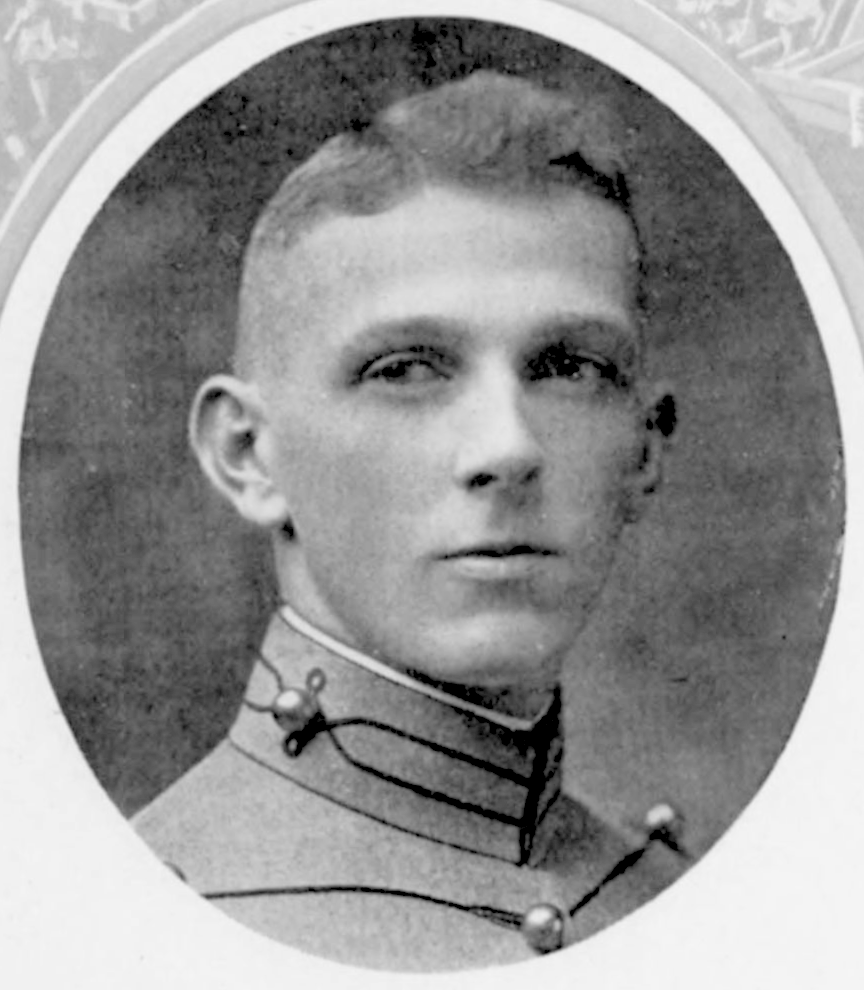
At West Point in 1920

On 14 June 1920, Stratton graduated, ranked 51st in the West Point class of 1920 (the course having been shortened to two years on account of the war), and was commissioned as a second lieutenant in the field artillery on 2 July. He never joined a field artillery unit, for during the summer break after graduation he managed to transfer to the Corps of Engineers, in which he was commissioned as a first lieutenant on 11 September 1920. He attended the Engineer Officer Basic Course at the United States Army Engineer School at Camp A. A. Humphreys in Virginia from 15 September 1920 to 27 January 1921, and was then assigned to the 5th Engineers at Camp Meade, Maryland. On 15 June 1921, he entered the Rensselaer Polytechnic Institute, where he was a member of Theta Xi fraternity, and from which he graduated with a Bachelor of Civil Engineering degree on 16 June 1922.

Stratton was posted to Camp Devens, Massachusetts, for duty with the Citizens' Military Training Camp, and then to 13th Engineers at Fort Humphreys, where he was reduced in rank to second lieutenant on 15 December 1922. On 6 December 1924 he went to Panama Canal Zone as assistant to the Supply Officer for the Military Survey of Panama, and then supply officer of the 11th Engineers. He was promoted to first lieutenant again on 4 April 1925. He returned to the United States in December 1927, and became an instructor with the 104th Engineers, a unit of the New Jersey National Guard.

In November 1931, Stratton joined the 8th Engineer Squadron at Fort McIntosh, Texas. There, he met and married Julia Selby Bryant in 1932. They had a son, William R. Stratton, and two daughters, Terry and Julia. He also had a daughter, Patricia, from his first marriage to Janice (Brotzmann) Bergen. In 1933, he moved to St. Paul, Minnesota, as assistant district engineer, where he worked on flood control projects on the Mississippi River, and then to Tucumcari, New Mexico, where he worked on the Conchas Dam. He was promoted to captain on 1 August 1935. Further duty followed as assistant to the district engineers in Boston, Massachusetts, and Denison, Texas, before returning to the Conchas Dam as district engineer on 4 November 1939. He then became the district engineer in Caddoa, Colorado, where he was in charge of the John Martin Reservoir project.

== World War II ==
Stratton was promoted to major in the Corps of Engineers on 1 July 1940 and lieutenant colonel in the Army of the United States (AUS) on 11 December 1941. On 11 December 1941—four days after the Japanese attack on Pearl Harbor that brought the United States into World War II—he became the Chief of Engineering in the Office of Chief of Engineers, based in the Railroad Retirement Board Building in Washington, D.C. This was the largest of the branches of the Construction Division, which had recently been transferred to the Corps of Engineers from the Quartermaster Corps, with about 1,400 personnel. Stratton started with decentralizing the office. He told his section chiefs that "we have a job for everyone in this branch, either here or in the field. ... I know many of the Quartermaster people particularly are worried. No one will be out in the street." Over the following months the staff was reduced to about 500, largely through transfers to the district offices. An important part of his job was managing wartime shortages of critical materials. Stratton ordered a sweeping review of structural plans, and huge quantities of scarce materials were saved as a result. One of his civilian assistants described Stratton as "an Engineer who was an engineer". He was promoted to colonel (AUS) on 4 July 1942. For his services as Chief of Engineering, he was awarded the Legion of Merit.

On 15 September 1943, Stratton became the Assistant Chief of Staff, G-4, of the United States Army Services of Supply (SOS) in the European Theater of Operations, United States Army (ETOUSA), with the rank of brigadier general (AUS) from 28 May 1944. SOS headquarters was subsequently merged with that of ETOUSA, and officially became the Communications Zone (COMZ) on 7 June 1944. The G-4 was the staff member responsible for logistics, and since that was the role of SOS/COMZ, his was the most important one on the staff. It was considered an unusual appointment, as Stratton had no formal staff training, having not attended the Command and General Staff College or the Army War College, had no experience in logistical support of armies in the field, and had not been involved in the development of the Operation Overlord plan for the Allied invasion of Normandy and the subsequent operations in Northwest Europe. Nonetheless, he remained in this role for the rest of the war. For his services, he was awarded the Army Distinguished Service Medal.

Stratton returned to United States in March 1945, and became the Assistant Chief of Engineers of Civil Works. The civil works program had languished during the war, but a revitalised program provided large numbers of jobs in the immediate post-war years. He reverted to his substantive rank of lieutenant colonel on 31 January 1946. On 1 May 1946, he was appointed the Chief of the Special Engineering Division in the Panama Canal Zone, reporting to the Governor of the Panama Canal Zone on the future development of the Panama Canal. He was promoted to colonel again on 11 March 1948. His final assignment, on 1 June 1948, was as Boston District Engineer. He retired from the army with the rank of colonel on 31 July 1949, but was subsequently promoted to his wartime rank of brigadier general on the retired list on 1 August 1949.

== Later life ==
After retiring from the army, Stratton joined the Knappen-Tippetts-Abbett Engineering Company, a consulting engineering firm in New York that had been founded by Theodore Knappen, a fellow member of the West Point Class of 1920. He became a partner in the firm in 1951, and it was renamed Tippetts-Abbett-McCarthy-Stratton. He was involved in several major water resources projects in Iraq, Turkey, Greece and Latin America. He also directed the engineering of the Tarbela Dam in Pakistan, the world's largest embankment dam, and the design of the Eisenhower Tunnel through the Rocky Mountains in Colorado, which was the highest vehicle tunnel in the world when it was opened. He retired in January 1967, and moved to Washington, DC.

Stratton's publications included a 1945 article on military airfields that received the American Society of Civil Engineers' Arthur M. Wellington Prize, and he contributed chapters to the Handbook of Applied Hydraulics (1952) and American Civil Engineering Practice (1956). He was elected an honorary member of the American Society of Civil Engineers in 1979, and a member of the National Academy of Engineering in 1981. He was a member of the board of education in Englewood, New Jersey, for seven years, and a member of the Special Curricula Committee that advised the dean of the Massachusetts Institute of Technology (MIT) Department of Civil and Sanitary Engineering on the structure and content of undergraduate courses. He also served on MIT's board of visitors, which met once a year to advise the department.

Stratton died from congestive heart failure at Walter Reed Army Medical Center in Washington, D.C., on 16 March 1984, at the age of 85, and was buried in Arlington National Cemetery.

== Dates of rank ==
| Insignia | Rank | Component | Date | Reference |
|---|---|---|---|---|
| | Second Lieutenant | Field Artillery | 2 July 1920 | |
| | First Lieutenant | Field Artillery | 2 July 1920 | |
| | First Lieutenant | Corps of Engineers | 11 September 1920 | |
| | Second Lieutenant | Corps of Engineers | 15 December 1922 | |
| | First Lieutenant | Corps of Engineers | 4 April 1925 | |
| | Captain | Corps of Engineers | 1 August 1935 | |
| | Major | Corps of Engineers | 1 July 1940 | |
| | Lieutenant Colonel | Army of the United States | 11 December 1941 | |
| | Colonel | Army of the United States | 4 July 1942 | |
| | Lieutenant Colonel | Corps of Engineers | 2 July 1943 | |
| | Brigadier General | Army of the United States | 28 May 1944 | |
| | Lieutenant Colonel (reverted) | Corps of Engineers | 31 January 1946 | |
| | Colonel | Corps of Engineers | 11 March 1948 | |
| | Colonel | Retired List | 31 July 1949 | |
| | Brigadier General | Retired List | 1 August 1949 | |
