= Hasty, Colorado =

Census-designated place in Bent County, CO, USA

- Census-designated place
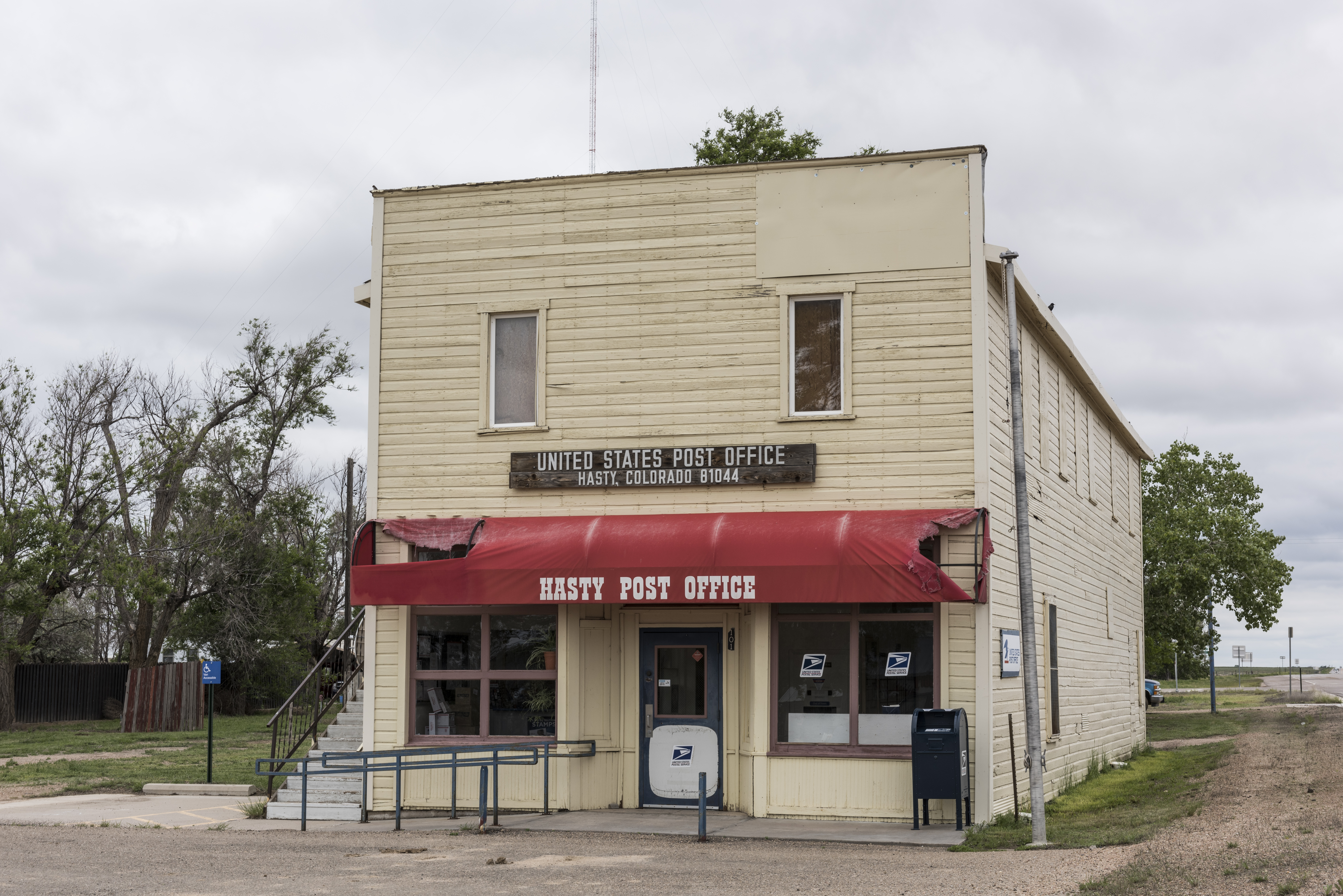
- Hasty Post Office (2015)

- Location within Bent County and Colorado
- Coordinates: 38°06′00″N 102°57′50″W
- Country: United States
- State: Colorado
- County: Bent

Area
  - Total: 2.754 sq mi (7.132 km^{2})
  - Land: 2.753 sq mi (7.131 km^{2})
  - Water: 0.00023 sq mi (0.0006 km^{2})
- Elevation: 3,924 ft (1,196 m)

Population (2020)
  - Total: 182
  - Density: 66.1/sq mi (25.5/km^{2})
- Time zone: UTC−7 (MST)
  - Summer (DST): UTC−6 (MDT)
- ZIP Code: 81044
- Area code: 719
- GNIS ID: 2583243
- FIPS code: 08-34685

Hasty is an unincorporated town in Bent County, Colorado, United States. As of the 2020 census, Hasty had a population of 182.

== History ==
The Hasty post office has been in operation since 1910. The community was named after Lon Hasty, a pioneer settler. The Hasty post office has the ZIP code 81044. At the United States Census 2020, the population of the Hasty CDP was 182.

== Geography ==
Hasty is located in northeast Bent County just north of the dam for John Martin Reservoir on the Arkansas River. U.S. Highway 50 passes through the community, leading west 16 miles (26 km) to Las Animas, the county seat, and east 20 miles (32 km) to Lamar.

The Hasty CDP has an area of 1,762 acres (7.132 km^{2}), including 0.25 acres (0.001 km^{2}) of water.

== Demographics ==
The United States Census Bureau initially defined the Hasty CDP for the United States Census 2010.

Hasty CDP, Colorado
Year	Pop.	±%
2010	144	—
2020	182	+26.4%
Source: United States Census Bureau

== See also ==
- Colorado census designated places
