= Las Animas, Colorado =

City in Colorado, United States

- Statutory City
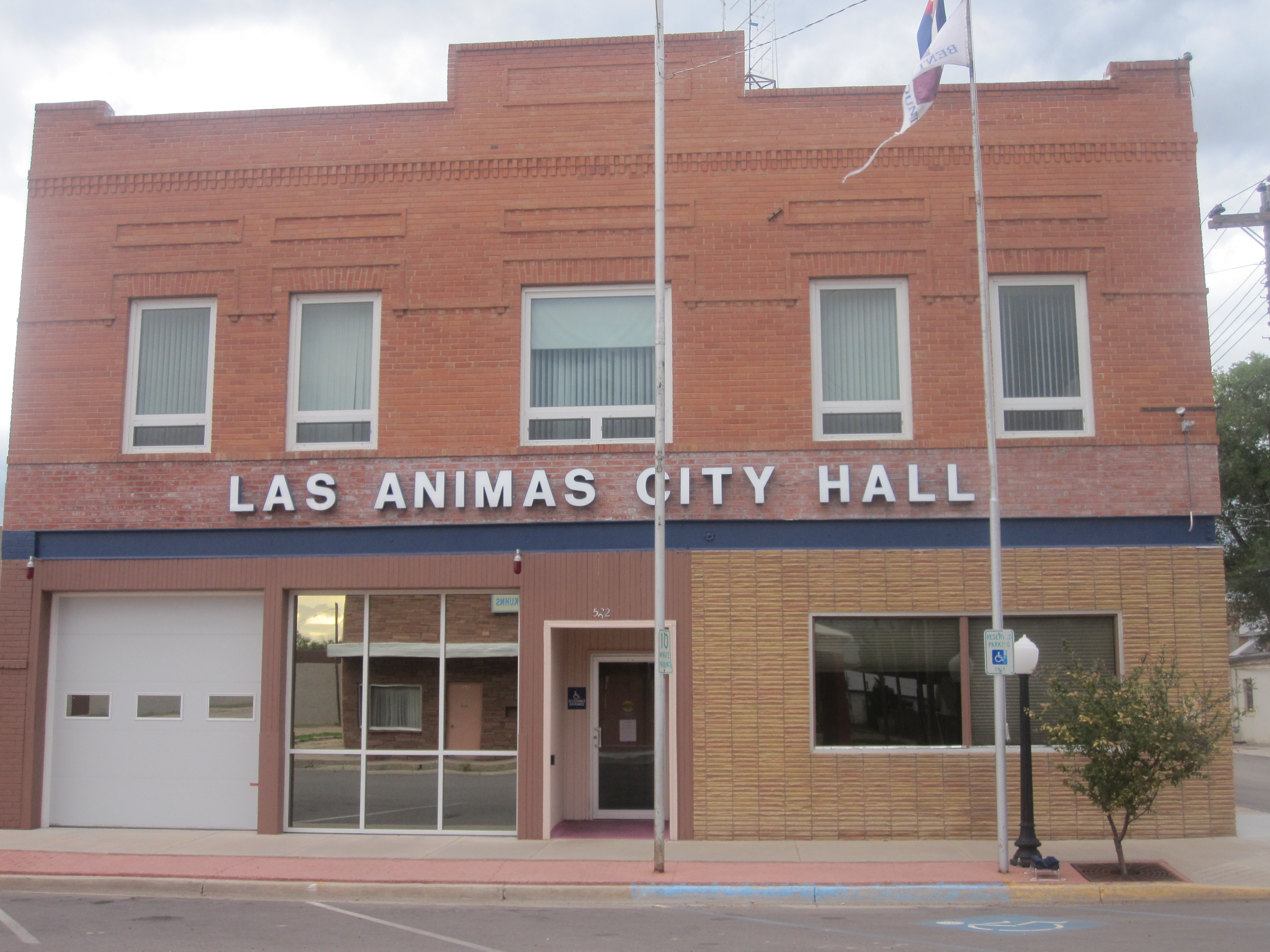
- City Hall (2010)

- Flag

- Location within Bent County and Colorado
- Coordinates: 38°04′10″N 103°13′25″W
- Country: United States
- State: Colorado
- County: Bent
- Incorporated: May 15, 1886

Government
  - Mayor: Jim Collins

Area
  - Total: 1.67 sq mi (4.33 km^{2})
  - Land: 1.63 sq mi (4.21 km^{2})
  - Water: 0.046 sq mi (0.12 km^{2})
- Elevation: 3,898 ft (1,188 m)

Population (2020)
  - Total: 2,300
  - Density: 1,400/sq mi (550/km^{2})
- Time zone: UTC−7 (MST)
  - Summer (DST): UTC−6 (MDT)
- ZIP Code: 81054
- Area code: 719
- GNIS ID: 2411628
- FIPS code: 08-43660
- Website: City website

Las Animas is the statutory city that is the county seat of, the most populous community in, and the only incorporated municipality in Bent County, Colorado, United States. The city's population was 2,300 at the 2020 United States census. Las Animas is located on the Arkansas River, just west of its confluence with the Purgatoire River, in southeast Colorado east of Pueblo, near the historic Bent's Fort.

== Etymology ==
According to legend, the town and the Purgatoire River were named after a group of conquistadores, probably part of Coronado's expedition, who died without the last rites sacrament of a priest. According to Catholic belief, their souls would go to Purgatory as a result. The original Spanish name for Las Ánimas ("The Souls", in Spanish) was purported to be La Ciudad de Las Ánimas Perdidas en Purgatorio, "The city of lost souls in Purgatory." According to author Morris F. Taylor, though, this is not consistent with Spanish Catholic belief, but a French Catholic belief. The Spanish version, El Río de las Ánimas Perdidas en Purgatorio, was considered an embellishment of the French version. No 19th-century map shows this full Spanish name or any translation of it. Existing maps have different names for the river: Río de Las Ánimas, Purgatory River, and "Picatoire", a corruption of Purgatoire (which today is anglicized as Picketwire). French fur traders of the 19th century referred to the river as the Purgatoire. Another anglicization was the Pick of Ware.

== History ==
=== Early settlement ===
Gantt's Picket Post, also known as Fort Gantt, was built near the present-day Las Animas in 1832, operating as a trading post until 1834. The second Fort Lyon military post was built in Las Animas in 1867. It operated until 1897.

=== Water issues ===
Water is a central issue in Las Animas. Like many cities in southeastern Colorado, Las Animas competes with wealthier cities on the Front Range for the water to sustain life and the local agricultural economy. Developers and municipalities have capitalized upon drought and low crop prices by buying water from desperate farmers. As this water is diverted upstream to serve the larger cities, Las Animas loses access to this important resource.

Because of the poor quality of the city's water supply, a reverse-osmosis filtration plant was installed in the mid-1990s. The loss of minerals in the water resulted in the collapse of many water mains, which had been supported by mineral deposits that formed on the insides of the pipes.

== Geography ==
Las Animas is located in northwest Bent County along the Arkansas River. U.S. Highway 50 is the main highway through the city, leading west 82 miles (132 km) to Pueblo and east 36 miles (58 km) to Lamar.

According to the United States Census Bureau, the city has a total area of 1.7 square miles (4.3 km^{2}), of which 0.039 sq mi (0.1 km^{2}), or 2.75%, is covered by water.

=== Climate ===
Las Animas is often one of the warmest cities in Colorado, but winters can still be quite cold. The record low temperature in Las Animas of −32 °F (−35.6 °C) occurred most recently on January 28, 1948. The record high temperature for Las Animas is 114 °F (45.6 °C) and occurred most recently on June 24, 2012. Each year there are roughly 83 afternoons that hit 90 °F (32.2 °C) or hotter, with 22 reaching at least 100 °F or 37.8 °C. The record for lowest maximum temperature was on December 20, 1924, when the high was −8 °F (−22.2 °C). On the other end of the spectrum, Las Animas’ hottest minimum temperature occurred August 2, 1935, with a low of 89 °F (31.7 °C).

Climate data for Las Animas 1991-2020 normals, extremes 1893-
Month	Jan	Feb	Mar	Apr	May	Jun	Jul	Aug	Sep	Oct	Nov	Dec	Year
Record high °F (°C)	84 (29)	85 (29)	94 (34)	100 (38)	106 (41)	114 (46)	114 (46)	110 (43)	106 (41)	99 (37)	90 (32)	88 (31)	114 (46)
Mean daily maximum °F (°C)	47.8 (8.8)	51.6 (10.9)	61.8 (16.6)	69.6 (20.9)	79.2 (26.2)	90.0 (32.2)	94.5 (34.7)	91.7 (33.2)	84.6 (29.2)	71.3 (21.8)	58.2 (14.6)	47.6 (8.7)	70.7 (21.5)
Mean daily minimum °F (°C)	15.5 (−9.2)	19.3 (−7.1)	28.1 (−2.2)	36.8 (2.7)	47.5 (8.6)	57.8 (14.3)	63.0 (17.2)	61.1 (16.2)	51.9 (11.1)	37.4 (3.0)	24.9 (−3.9)	16.0 (−8.9)	38.3 (3.5)
Record low °F (°C)	−32 (−36)	−31 (−35)	−26 (−32)	5 (−15)	17 (−8)	32 (0)	32 (0)	34 (1)	22 (−6)	−1 (−18)	−14 (−26)	−32 (−36)	−32 (−36)
Average precipitation inches (mm)	0.38 (9.7)	0.32 (8.1)	0.78 (20)	1.36 (35)	1.69 (43)	1.81 (46)	2.63 (67)	1.82 (46)	0.93 (24)	1.10 (28)	0.40 (10)	0.36 (9.1)	13.58 (345.9)
Average snowfall inches (cm)	3.9 (9.9)	2.3 (5.8)	3.3 (8.4)	0.4 (1.0)	0 (0)	0 (0)	0 (0)	0 (0)	0 (0)	1.5 (3.8)	1.9 (4.8)	2.9 (7.4)	16.2 (41.1)
Average precipitation days (≥ 0.01 in)	2.7	3.1	4.5	5.4	6.9	6.5	7.3	6.8	4.3	4.3	2.8	2.7	57.3
Average snowy days (≥ 0.1 in)	1.8	1.8	1.2	0.3	0	0	0	0	0	0.4	1.1	1.9	8.5
Source 1: NOAA
Source 2: NCEI

== Demographics ==
Historical population
Census	Pop.	Note	%±
1880	52		—
1890	611		1,075.0%
1900	1,192		95.1%
1910	2,008		68.5%
1920	2,252		12.2%
1930	2,517		11.8%
1940	3,232		28.4%
1950	3,223		−0.3%
1960	3,402		5.6%
1970	3,148		−7.5%
1980	2,818		−10.5%
1990	2,481		−12.0%
2000	2,758		11.2%
2010	2,410		−12.6%
2020	2,300		−4.6%
U.S. Decennial Census

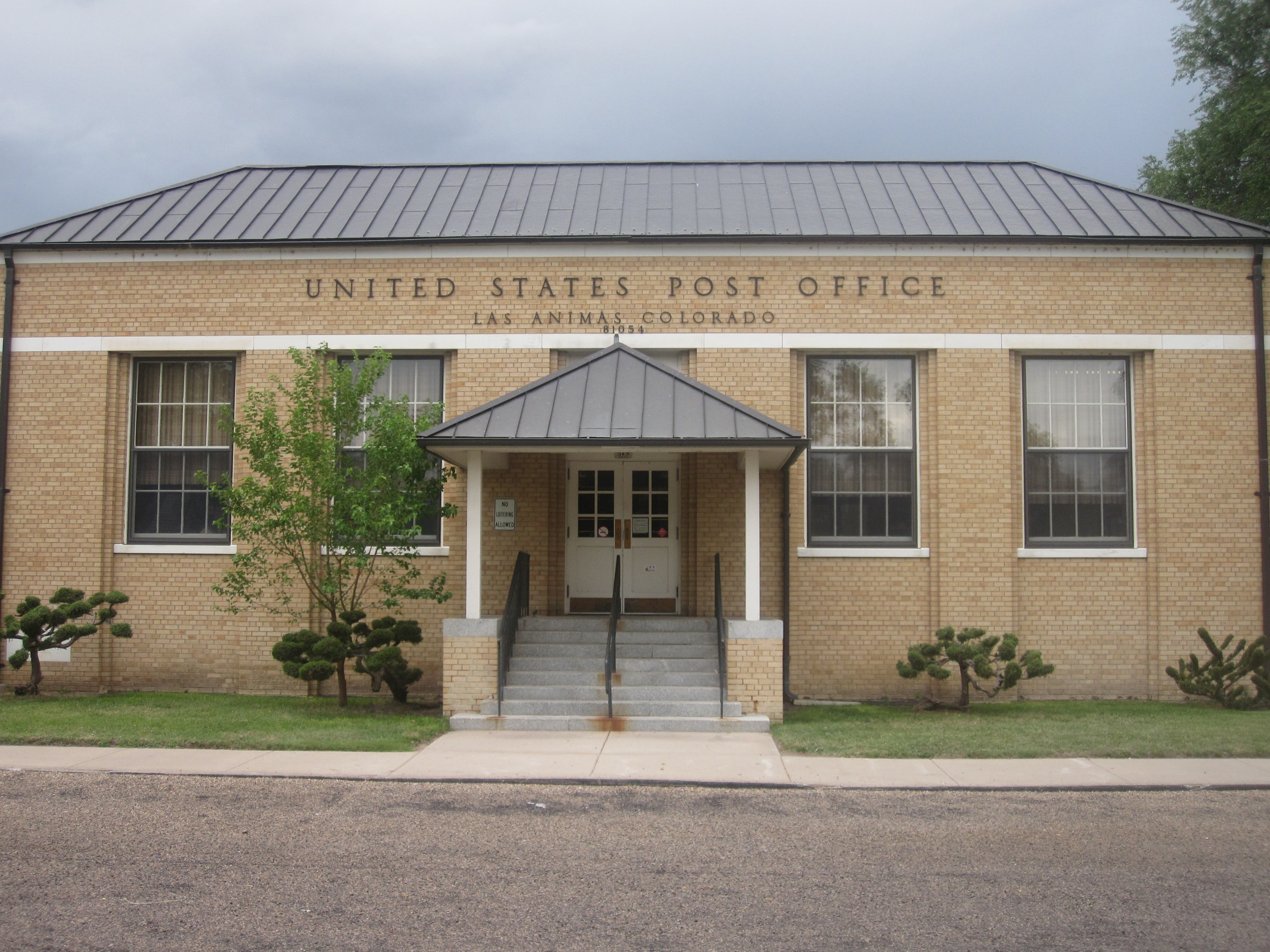
U.S. Post Office in Las Animas

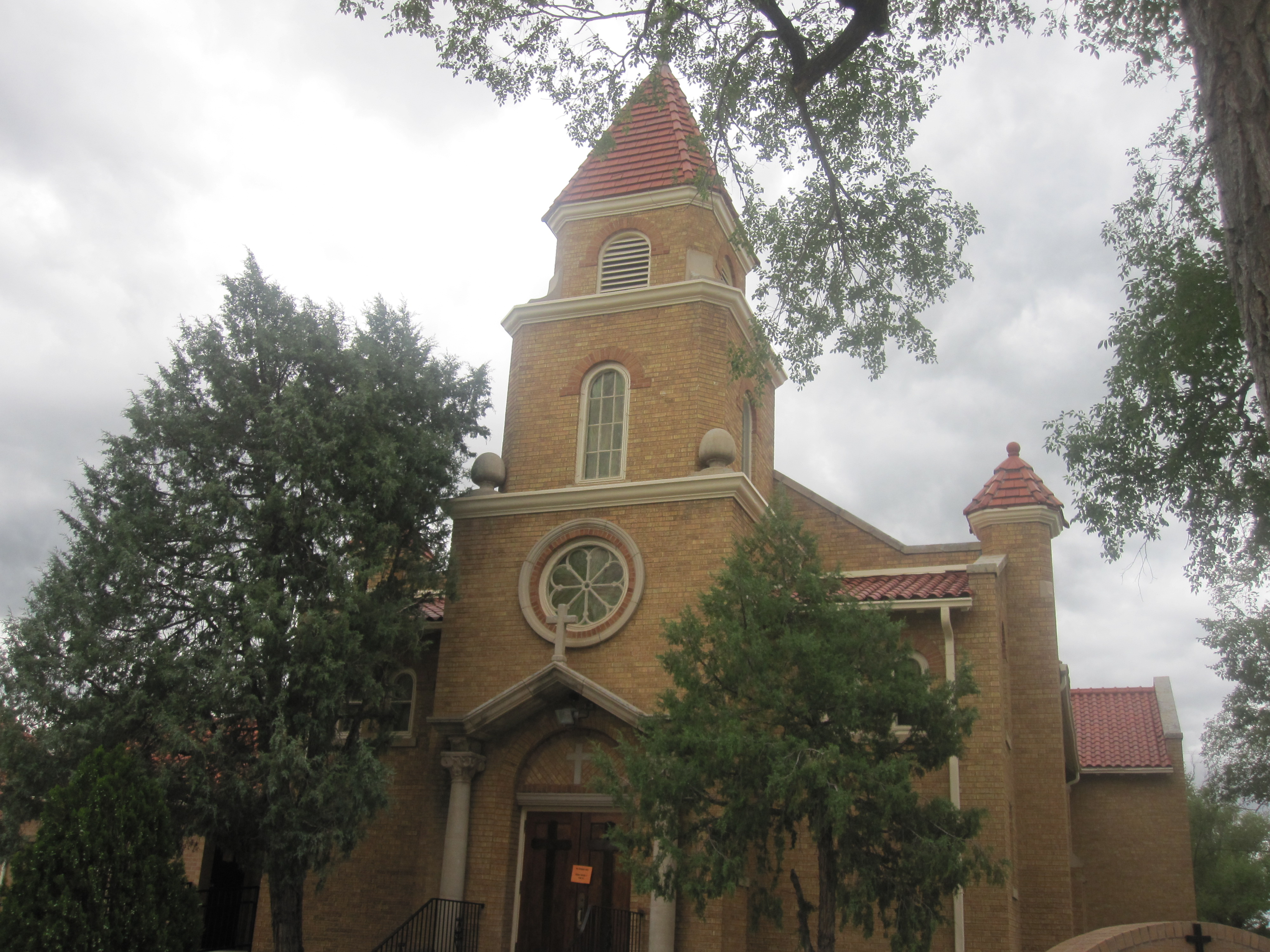
St. Mary's Catholic Church in Las Animas

=== 2020 census ===
As of the 2020 census, Las Animas had a population of 2,300. The median age was 44.1 years. 21.5% of residents were under the age of 18 and 22.7% of residents were 65 years of age or older. For every 100 females there were 92.5 males, and for every 100 females age 18 and over there were 92.5 males age 18 and over.

0.0% of residents lived in urban areas, while 100.0% lived in rural areas.

There were 1,007 households in Las Animas, of which 28.0% had children under the age of 18 living in them. Of all households, 32.8% were married-couple households, 25.6% were households with a male householder and no spouse or partner present, and 34.2% were households with a female householder and no spouse or partner present. About 38.4% of all households were made up of individuals and 18.6% had someone living alone who was 65 years of age or older.

There were 1,178 housing units, of which 14.5% were vacant. The homeowner vacancy rate was 4.0% and the rental vacancy rate was 5.9%.

Racial composition as of the 2020 census
Race	Number	Percent
White	1,596	69.4%
Black or African American	31	1.3%
American Indian and Alaska Native	74	3.2%
Asian	21	0.9%
Native Hawaiian and Other Pacific Islander	0	0.0%
Some other race	276	12.0%
Two or more races	302	13.1%
Hispanic or Latino (of any race)	927	40.3%

=== 2000 census ===
As of the census of 2000, 2,758 people, 1,091 households, and 716 families resided in the city. The population density was 2,134.2 inhabitants per square mile (824.0/km^{2}). The 1,264 housing units had an average density of 978.1 units per square mile (377.6 units/km^{2}). The racial makeup of the city was 74.87% White, 0.91% African American, 2.86% Native American, 0.58% Asian, 15.34% from other races, and 5.44% from two or more races. Hispanics or Latinos of any race were 42.6% of the population.

Of the 1,091 households, 31.0% had children under 18 living with them, 46.0% were married couples living together, 14.8% had a female householder with no husband present, and 34.3% were not families. About 30.7% of all households were made up of individuals, and 14.6% had someone living alone who was 65 or older. The average household size was 2.46 and the average family size was 3.04.

In the city, the age distribution was 27.3% under 18, 8.6% from 18 to 24, 24.0% from 25 to 44, 22.2% from 45 to 64, and 17.9% who were 65 or older. The median age was 38 years. For every 100 females, there were 94.1 males. For every 100 females 18 and over, there were 117.8 males.

The median income for a household in the city was $26,157, and for a family was $29,815. Males had a median income of $26,168 versus $23,250 for females. The per capita income for the city was $13,893. About 19.7% of families and 25.0% of the population were below the poverty line, including 39.3% of those under 18 and 14.4% of those 65 or over.

== Santa Fe Trail Day ==
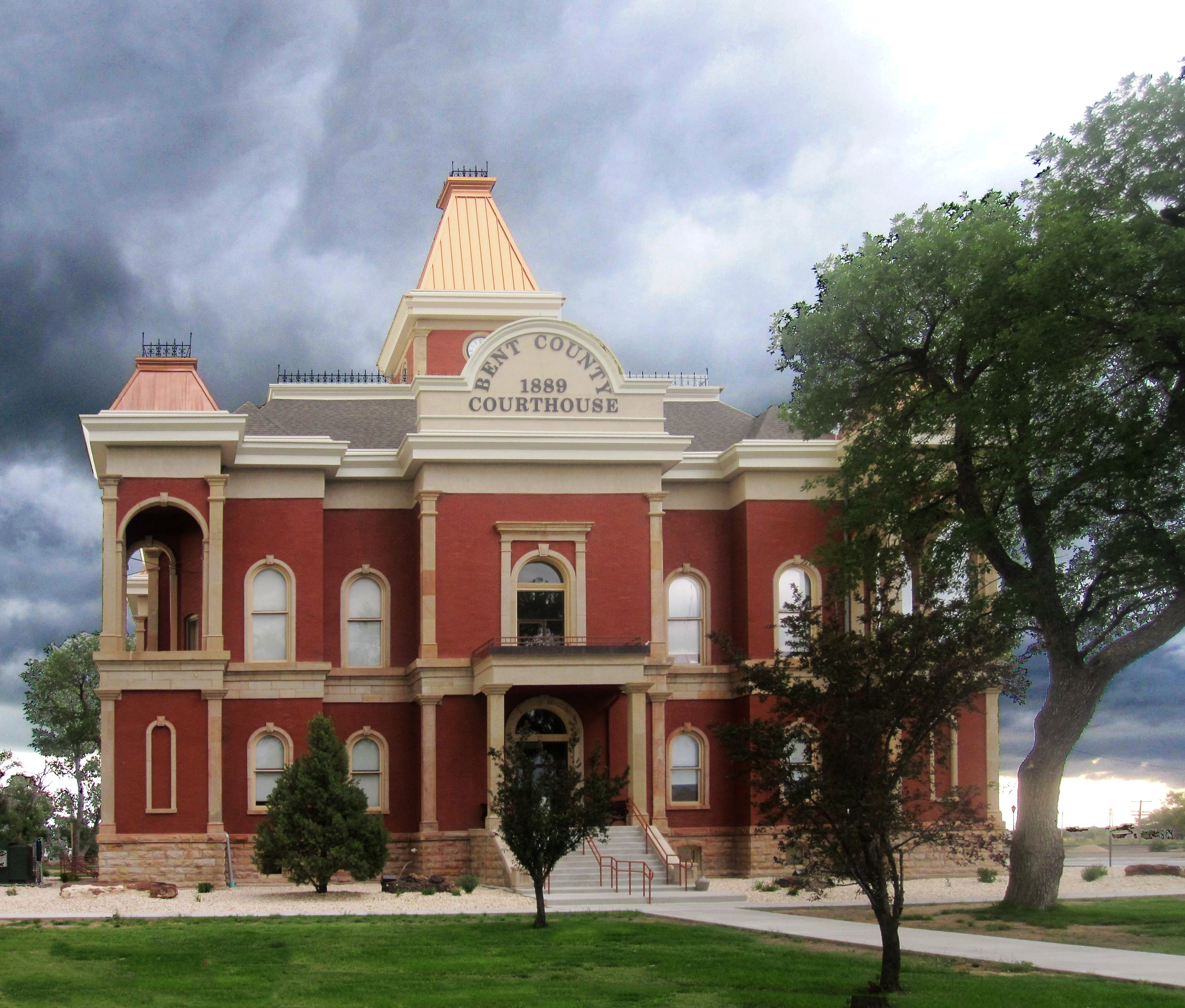
Bent County Courthouse

Las Animas sits along the Mountain Branch of the Santa Fe Trail and served as the major city in southeast Colorado until the Atchison, Topeka and Santa Fe Railroad established operations in La Junta, 20 miles (32 km) to the west of Las Animas.

Las Animas celebrates an annual Santa Fe Trail Day, a celebration of the pioneers and traders who used this trail. This local holiday is the oldest student council-sponsored event in the US. The Las Animas High School Student Council organizes the day, with assistance from the Bent County Chamber of Commerce. Festivities have included a parade, a costume contest, square dancing, a demolition derby, and a traditional "Ranchburger" lunch, as well as many other activities. From 2002 and forward, students have spread out events over a two-day period, sometimes making this a weekend event. The event originally occurred/started on the last Friday in April.

Notable dates in the event timeline history:

•April 26, 2002, is the official start of a multiday event, spreading over the weekend.

•April 24, 2009, Las Animas celebrated its 75th Annual Santa Fe Trail Day with special guests, those who previously were the Santa Fe Trail Day Crowned Queen and those who had been previously elected Student Council President, as far back as 1944 attended.

•April 24, 2020, and the COVID-19 pandemic, marked the first time in its history the town would not permit the community parade.

•Events were planned for April 26–28, 2024, in recognition for the 90th-anniversary commemoration.

== Education ==
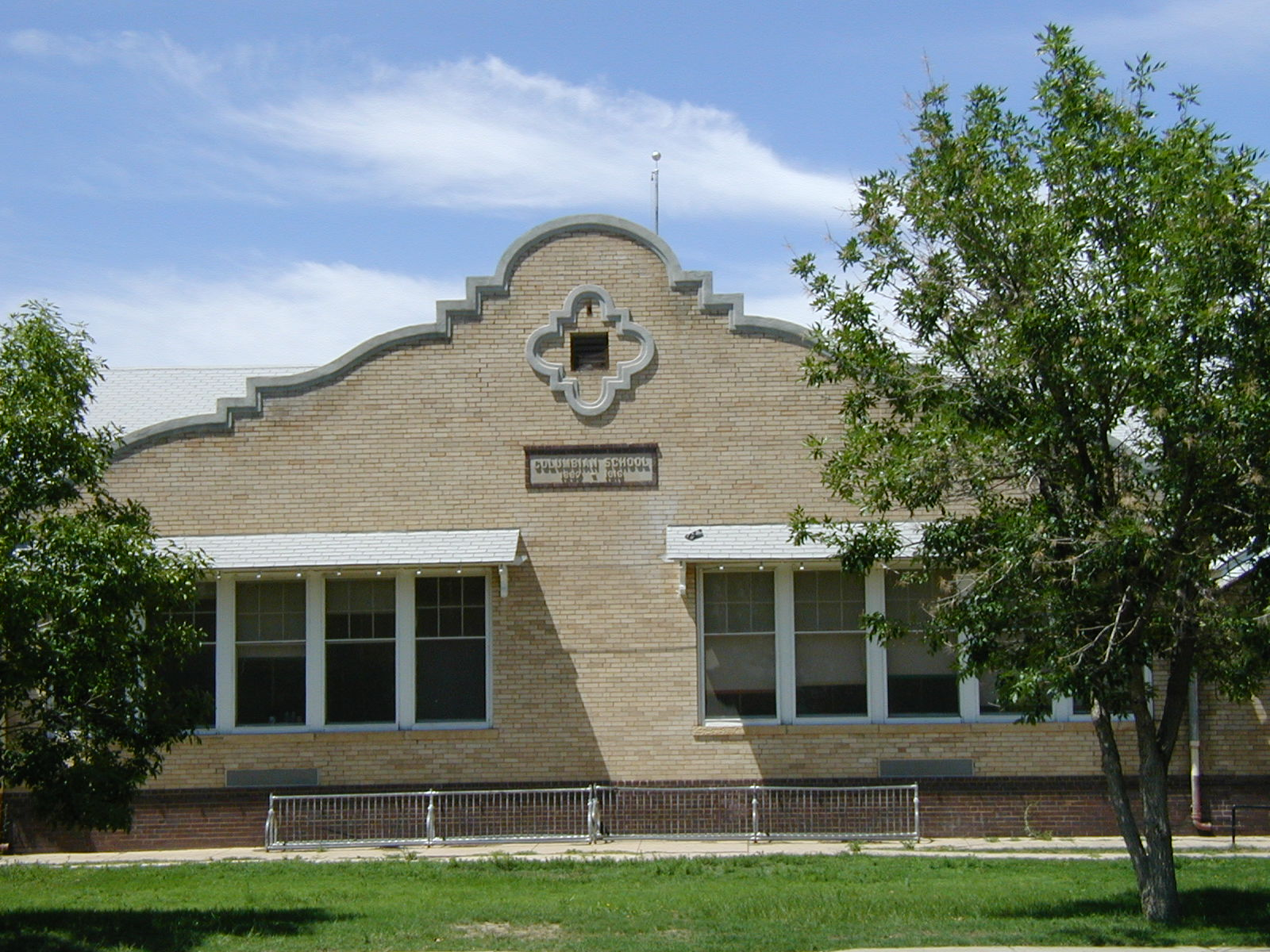
Columbian Elementary School (1916), photographed 2005

Columbian Elementary School

Built in 1916 to replace the old Columbian School (1887), Columbian Elementary School was the only building of Spanish architecture style in Las Animas. It was also the only open-courtyard school in the state of Colorado. In 2004, it was added to the National Register of Historic Places because of its significance, and, needing renovation for continued use, it was on the 2004 Colorado Preservation, Inc. List of Endangered Places. As attempts were made to preserve the building, a modern facility was built to the west, inhabiting what was the playground and open area for the now demolished original structure. Though it was evaluated by outside sources as being unfit for the building's intended use, the city hired a demolition firm to remove the materials, though it was found to have had asbestos in the building materials, and from residents who witnessed the structure fall, there was only minimal containment.

Considered by the School Board and all but a handful of citizens to be too costly to renovate, this 90-year-old building was demolished on February 21, 2006. Following demolition, the school was delisted on July 26, 2006. The city constructed a new elementary school just west of the old school location.

== Transportation ==
Las Animas is incorporated into the Bustang's network. It is part of Lamar-Pueblo-Colorado Springs Outrider line.

== Notable people ==
Notable individuals who were born in or have lived in Las Animas include fur trader and rancher William Bent, actor and singer Ken Curtis, and editor and arts patron Mari Yoriko Sabusawa.

== See also ==
- Colorado municipalities
- Bent's Old Fort National Historic Site
- Santa Fe National Historic Trail
