= Mud Springs Station Archeological District =

Historic district in Nebraska, United States

- Mud Springs Pony Express Station Site
- U.S. National Register of Historic Places
- U.S. Historic district
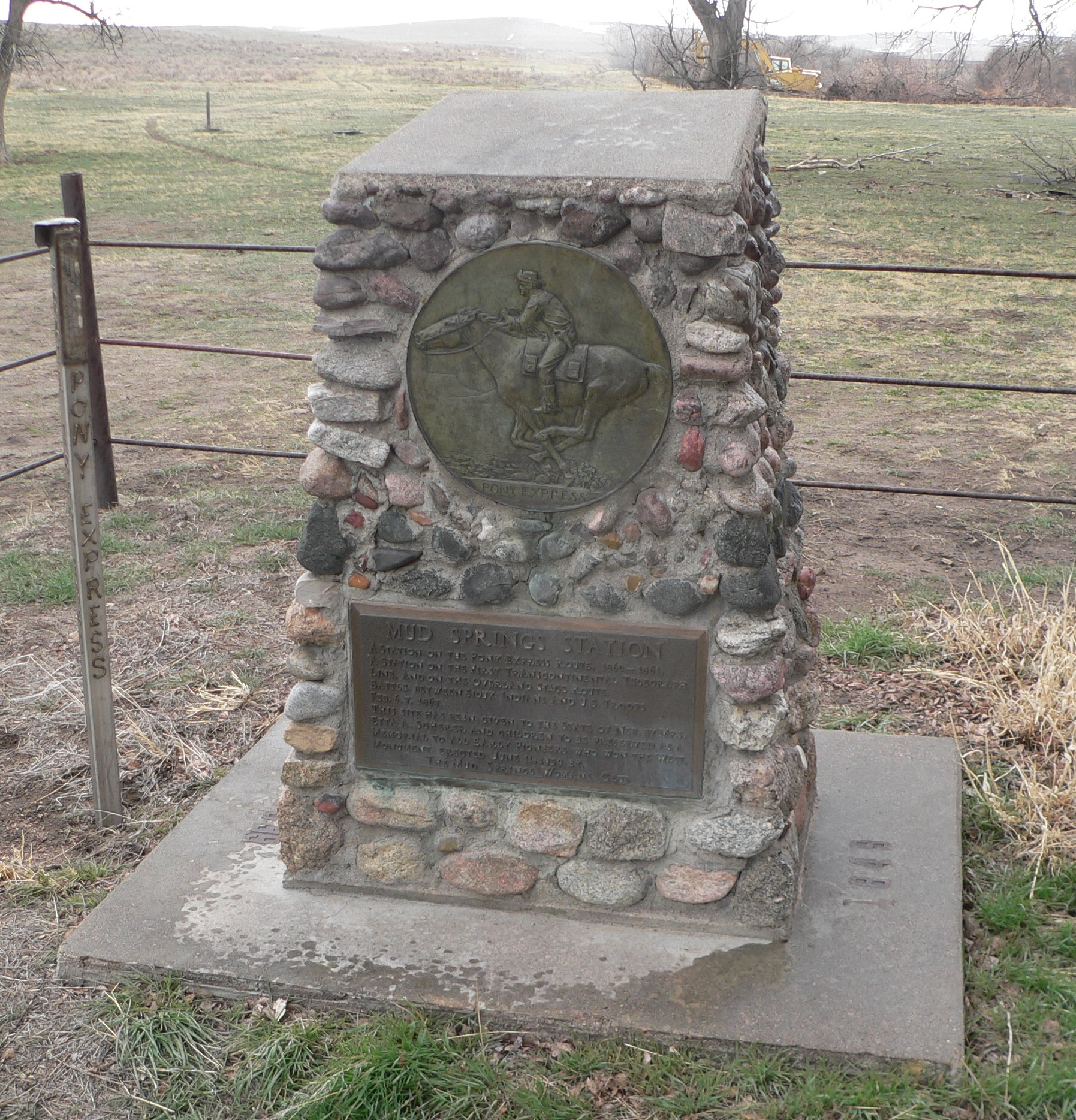

- Location within Nebraska Location within the United States
- Location: County road 107 between 68 and 70
- Nearest city: Dalton, Nebraska
- Coordinates: 41°29′04″N 103°01′02″W
- Area: 48 acres (19 ha)
- Built: 1856
- NRHP reference No.: 73001068
- Added to NRHP: April 24, 1973

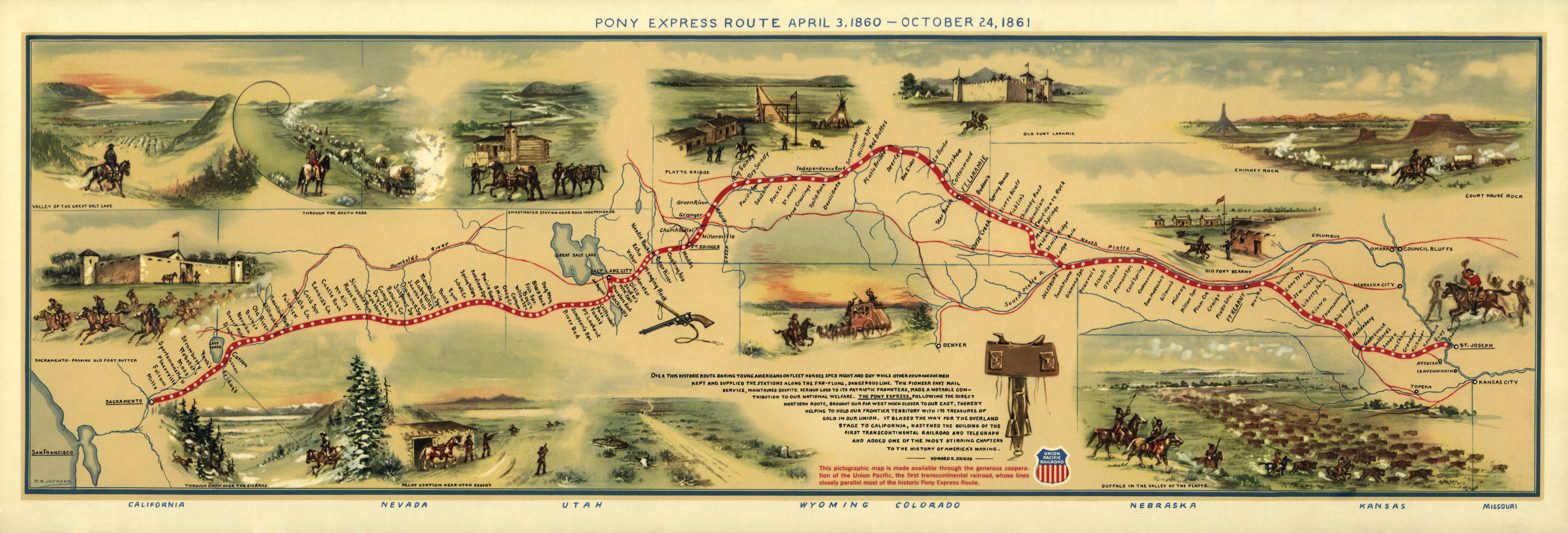
Map of Pony Express stations in 1860, including Mud Springs

The Mud Springs Station Archaeological District, which includes the Mud Springs Pony Express Station Site, near Dalton, Nebraska, has significance dating to the mid-19th century. The Pony Express station at Mud Springs, staffed by U.S. soldiers, was attacked by Lakota, Cheyenne, and Arapaho tribesmen during February 4–6, 1865, in what became known as the Battle of Mud Springs.

In 1966, the site of the Pony Express station was a 150-by-150-foot (46 m × 46 m) plot. Part of the present area was listed on the National Register of Historic Places in 1973 as Mud Springs Pony Express Station Site, and the listing was expanded to 48 acres (19 ha) and renamed on the register in 2011. It has also been designated Nebraska historic site 25MO72.

== Brief history ==
Mud Springs Station, a Native American territory in the olden times, served as a Pony Express site in 1860-61. It was named after the springs found at the opening of a canyon that divided Lodge Pole Creek and North Platte River Valleys, Dalton, Nebraska. The station served travelers en route the dry and arid trail from the Lodge Pole Creek to Oregon.

In 1859, Mud Springs Station saw the coming of crude houses and a stage station for coach service, the movement called as Pony Express. But its life proved short-lived and in, 1861, abruptly ceased. But, as a legacy, a transcontinental telegraph station was established at Mud Springs Station and a daily stage coach service continued its service.

The telegraph station, that served till 1876 proved a savior for Mud Spring Station, when an attack by the Sioux and Cheyenne Indians in the Battle of Mud Springs was thwarted by a SOS telegraph sent to US troops and the subsequent arrival of reinforcements to counter the attack. Today, as the last vestige of the Mud Spring Station, a stone monument, inlaid with a bronze Pony Express plaque, stands at the historic site.

Currently, listed on the National Register of Historic Places, originally, the Pony Express Station site was donated in 1939 to the Nebraska State Historical Society, by the then site-owner, Mrs. Scherer.

== See also ==
- Battle of Rush Creek
