= Battle of Julesburg =

1865 battle of the Colorado War

- Part of the Colorado War
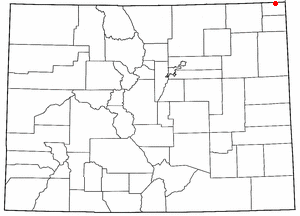
- The location of Julesburg, Colorado and the battle.
Date	7 January 1865
Location	Julesburg, Colorado 40.9389°N 102.3783°W
Result	Native American victory

Belligerents
United States Army; Civilian volunteers	Cheyenne, Arapaho, and Lakota Native Americans

Commanders and leaders
Captain Nicholas J. O'Brien	Roman Nose, Spotted Tail, Pawnee Killer, Big Crow

Strength
60 soldiers 50 armed civilians	About 1,000 warriors

Casualties and losses
14 soldiers killed 4 civilians killed	None

The Battle of Julesburg took place on January 7, 1865, near Julesburg, Colorado between 1,000 Cheyenne, Arapaho, and Lakota Indians and about 60 soldiers of the U.S. army and 40 to 50 civilians. The Indians defeated the soldiers and over the next few weeks plundered ranches and stagecoach stations up and down the South Platte River valley.

== Background ==
The U.S. Army's Sand Creek Massacre of Cheyenne and Arapaho on November 29, 1864, caused a large number of Indians on the Kansas and Colorado Great Plains to intensify hostilities against the U.S. Army and white settlers. On January 1, 1865, the Indians met on Cherry Creek (near present-day St. Francis, Kansas) to plan revenge. In the meeting were the Cheyenne Dog Soldiers, the Northern Arapaho, and two bands of Lakota Sioux, the Sichangu under Spotted Tail, and the Oglala under Pawnee Killer. Roman Nose was probably among the Cheyenne warriors. The Indian army numbered about 1,000 warriors. They decided that their target would be Julesburg, Colorado, located along the South Platte River.

Julesburg was a prominent way station on the Overland Trail. It consisted of a stagecoach station, stables, an express and telegraph office, a warehouse, and a large store that catered to travelers going to Denver along the South Platte. The residents were described as "Fifty men ... all armed to the teeth with everything arranged so they could fight behind sod walls". One mile west was Fort Rankin (later Fort Sedgwick) with a complement of one company of cavalry, about sixty men, under Captain Nicholas J. O'Brien. The fort, although only four months old, was formidable, measuring 240 by 360 feet (73 by 110 metres), and ringed by a sod wall 18 feet (5.5 m) tall.

== Battle ==
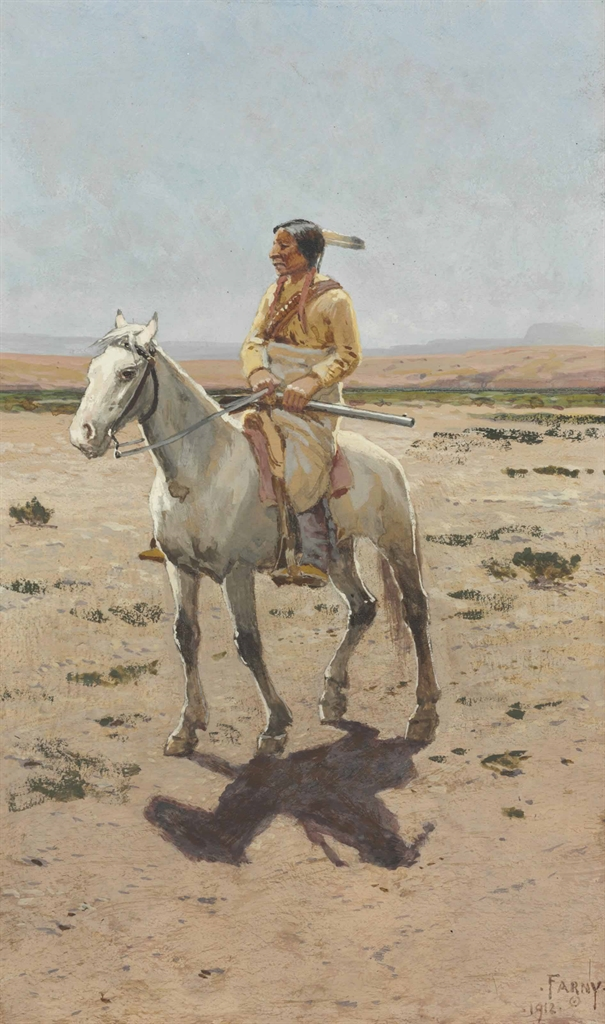
Painting of a Cheyenne scout.

The Julesburg Battle is unusual in that the main source of information about the battle comes from the Indian side, mostly from George Bent, a half Cheyenne/half White warrior who participated in the battle. Bent later told the story to anthropologists George Bird Grinnell and George E. Hyde.

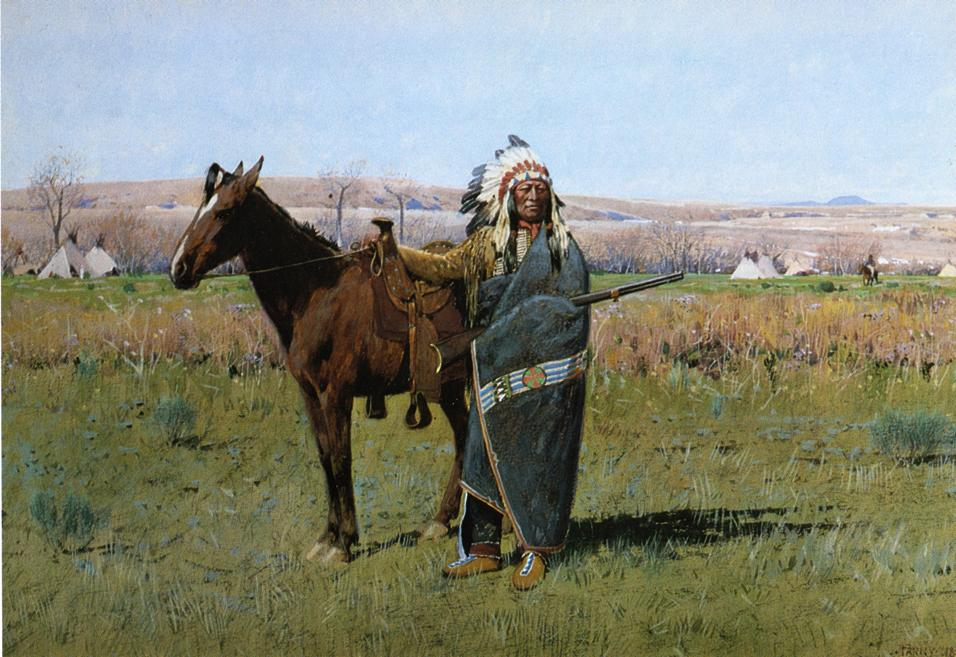
A painting of the Brule chieftain Spotted Tail, one of the leaders of the Sioux in the battle.

The Indian plan was to lure the soldiers out of Fort Rankin into an ambush and overwhelm them. Big Crow, a Cheyenne, picked ten men as the decoys. They charged at the fort and retreated in haste. Captain O'Brien led most of his men and a few civilian volunteers out of the fort to chase the Indian decoys. About three miles from the fort, O'Brien had almost ridden into the ambush when young Indian warriors fired at the soldiers prematurely, alerting him to the presence of a large number of warriors hidden behind nearby bluffs. The soldiers fled back toward the fort with the Indians in pursuit. The Indians caught them about 300 yards from the fort. Some of the soldiers were cut off. They dismounted to defend themselves and were killed. The surviving soldiers and civilians, including Captain O'Brien, made it back to shelter in the fort. Fourteen soldiers and four civilians were killed in the battle. Bent says that no Indians were killed or wounded, although the soldiers claimed they killed about 60.

All the civilians in the community were sheltering in the fort and the Indians, unopposed, looted the stage station, store, and warehouse carrying away a large amount of plunder. The soldiers in the fort fired a couple of artillery rounds at the Indians without effect.

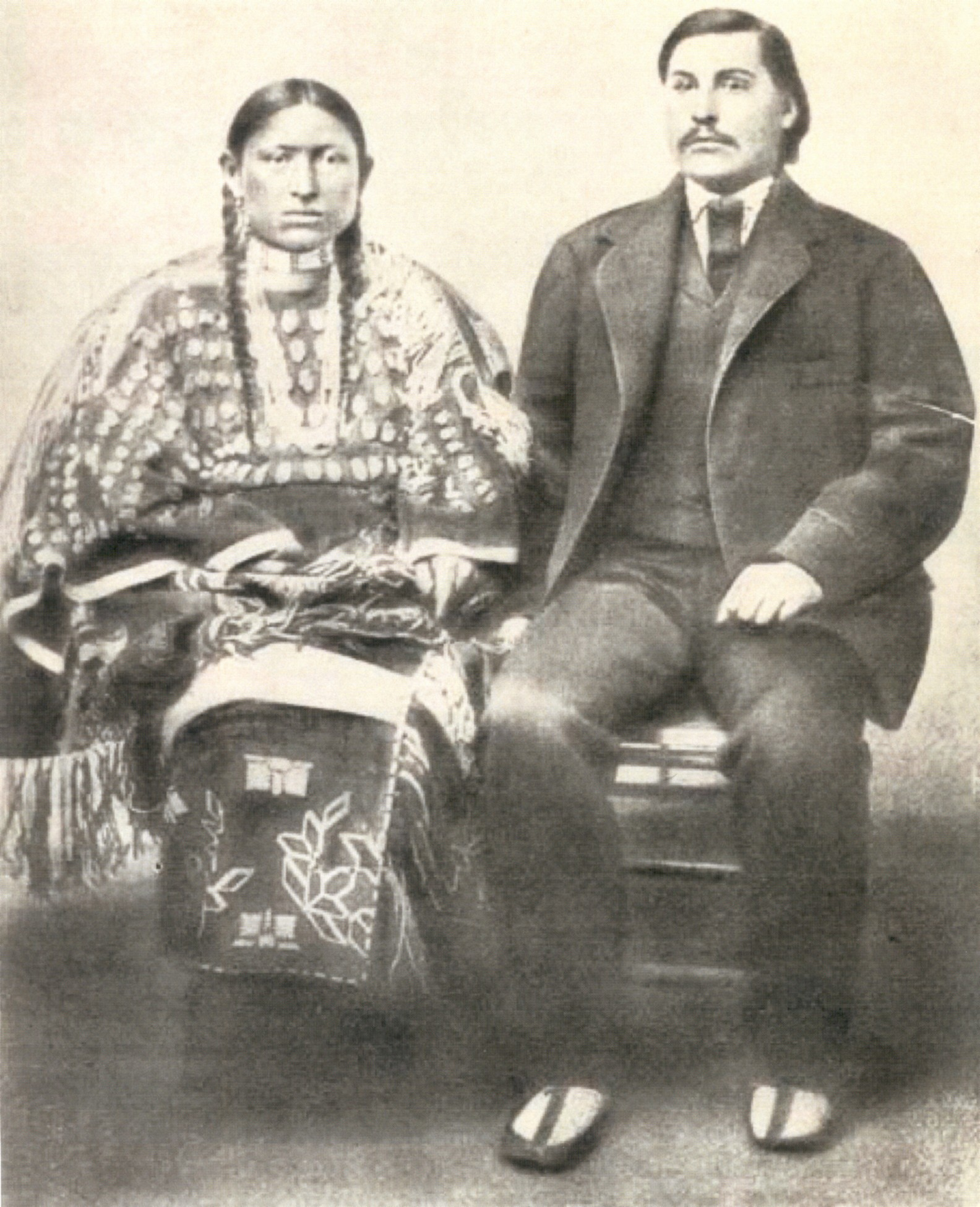
Cheyenne warrior George Bent and his wife Magpie in a photo taken many years after the battle

== Aftermath ==
Responding to the attack, General Robert Byington Mitchell gathered together 640 cavalry, a battery of howitzers, and 200 supply wagons at Cottonwood Springs (near present-day North Platte, Nebraska) and marched southwest to find and punish the Indians who had attacked Julesburg. On January 19, he found their camp on Cherry Creek, but the Indians had departed several days previously. With more than 50 soldiers incapacitated by frostbite in the bitterly cold weather, Mitchell gave up the chase and returned to his base. The only action during his expedition was when a small band of Indians rode through his camp at night, firing into the soldier's tents.

The Sioux, Cheyenne, and Arapaho had decided to move north to the Black Hills and Powder River Country of South Dakota and Wyoming. En route, from January 28 to Feb 2, the Indians raided ranches and stagecoach stations along 150 miles of the South Platte Valley between what are today the towns of Fort Morgan, Colorado and Paxton, Nebraska. The Sioux struck east of Julesburg, the Cheyenne west of Julesburg, and the Arapaho in between. At night, Bent said "the whole valley was lighted up with the flames of burning ranches and stage stations, but the places were soon all destroyed and darkness fell on the valley."

Bent participated in a raid near the Valley stagecoach station, near present-day Sterling, Colorado. The Cheyenne captured 500 cattle and had a skirmish with a company of army cavalry. The army claimed they killed 20 Indians and recovered the cattle; Bent said none were hurt, two soldiers were wounded, and only a few cattle were re-captured by the soldiers. Most of the Indian depredations were unopposed, although three Sioux warriors were killed in an attack on a wagon train. Bent noted that nine recently discharged soldiers who had participated in the Sand Creek massacre were killed by Cheyenne and their bodies mutilated.

On February 2, the Indian caravan of several thousand women, children, and livestock crossed the frozen South Platte 25 miles (40 km) west of Julesburg, heading north. The warriors raided Julesburg again, took the remaining supplies, and burned all the buildings. The 15 soldiers and 50 civilians sheltered in Fort Rankin did not venture outside the walls of the fort. Captain O'Brien and 14 men, who had been away from the fort, returned during the raid. Their presence was concealed for a time by smoke from the fires. Nearing the fort, O'Brien scattered the Indians with a round from his field howitzer; the men in the fort fired another howitzer to aid him, and O'Brien and his men dashed to safety inside the fort.

With the Sioux leading, because they were more familiar with the route, the Indians left Julesburg behind and proceeded north across the divide between the South Platte and North Platte rivers. They would have additional skirmishes with the army at Mud Springs (near present-day Dalton, Nebraska) and Rush Creek in early February 1865.

== See also ==
List of battles fought in Colorado
