= List of battles fought in Nebraska =

This is an incomplete list of military and other armed confrontations that have occurred within the boundaries of the modern US State of Nebraska since European contact. The region was part of the Viceroyalty of New Spain from 1535–1679, New France from 1679–1803, and part of the United States of America 1803–present.

The Plains Indian Wars directly affected the region during westward expansion.

== Battles ==
Name	Date	Location	War	Campaign	Dead	Belligerents
Villasur expedition	August 12–14, 1720	near modern Columbus, Nebraska	War of the Quadruple Alliance		46	Spanish Empire, Pueblo, & Apache vs. Pawnee & Otoe
Battle of Ash Hollow	September 3, 1855	near modern Lewellen, Nebraska	First Sioux War		113	Brulé vs. United States
Battle Creek	July 12, 1859	near modern Battle Creek, Nebraska	Pawnee War of 1859		0	United States vs. Pawnee
Little Blue River Raid	August 7–9, 1864	Little Blue River	Cheyenne War of 1864		38	Cheyenne, Arapaho & Lakota vs. Nebraska settlers
Plum Creek Massacre	August 8, 1864	near modern Lexington, Nebraska	Cheyenne War of 1864		13	Cheyenne vs. western emigrants
Oak Grove Station	August 9–10, 1864	near modern Oak, Nebraska	Cheyenne War of 1864		2	Cheyenne dog soldiers & Lakota vs. Nebraska settlers
Kiowa Ranch Station	August 10, 1864	near modern Deshler, Nebraska	Cheyenne War of 1864		2	Cheyenne & Lakota vs. Nebraska settlers
Battle of Mud Springs	February 4–6, 1865	near modern Dalton, Nebraska	Colorado War		1	Cheyenne, Lakota Sioux, & Arapaho vs. United States
Battle of Rush Creek	February 8–9, 1865	near modern Broadwater, Nebraska	Colorado War		4+	Cheyenne, Lakota Sioux, & Arapaho vs. United States
Massacre Canyon	August 5, 1873	Hitchcock County, Nebraska			69	Oglala, Brulé & Sihasapa vs. Pawnee
Battle of Warbonnet Creek	July 17, 1876	near modern Harrison, Nebraska	Great Sioux War of 1876		1	United States vs. Cheyenne

== See also ==
- History of Nebraska
- Plains Indians Wars
