= 1st Dakota Cavalry Battalion =

- Active: April 19, 1862 – November 15, 1865
- Disbanded: May 9, 1865
- Country: United States
- Allegiance: Union
- Branch: Cavalry
- Size: Company "A"; Company "B"
- Nickname: The Coyotes
- Engagements: Sully's Expedition (1863–1864): Battle of Killdeer Mountain; Battle of the Badlands; Powder River Expedition: Battle of Bone Pile Creek

The 1st Dakota Cavalry was a Union battalion of two companies raised in the Dakota Territory during the American Civil War. They were deployed along the frontier, primarily to protect the settlers during the Dakota War of 1862.

== Service ==
=== Company A ===
By order of the Department of War, organization of the 1st Dakota Cavalry began in the winter of 1861, with recruiting stations established at Yankton, Vermillion, and Bon Homme. At Yankton, the 98 men of Company A were mustered into service on April 19, 1862 under the command of Captain Nelson Miner. They first were stationed at Fort Randall under Lieutenant Colonel Pattee of the 7th Iowa Volunteer Cavalry Regiment, but detachments of the company were afterward sent to protect the settlements at Yankton, Vermillion, Sioux Falls and Brule Creek, Dakota Territory.

During the August 1862 Sioux uprising, Company A escorted settlers as they moved to protective stockades. Governor William Jayne also called for "every able-bodied man to arms in defense of the homes of Dakota", with 399 men responding.

=== Company B ===
At this time Captain Alpheus G. Fuller, an early settler in the territory, began raising a cavalry militia in Bon Homme and Charles Mix counties, the "Militia Brigade of Dakota". After failing to form a company for U.S. service, the men were merged with volunteers organizing at Elk Point. On March 31, 1863, these men were mustered in to form Company B at Sioux City, Iowa, with Captain William Tripp commanding. This company was known by settlers as the "Dakota Rangers".

Both companies were engaged in the protection of the Dakota frontier towns while Generals Henry H. Sibley and Alfred Sully, with regiments of infantry and cavalry from Minnesota, Iowa and Nebraska, sought out the hostile Indians throughout the territory. The two companies were split into detachments for use in the several settlements.

As the Civil War and Indian conflicts were drawing to a close, Companies A and B were mustered out on May 9, 1865, and November 15, 1865 respectively. The battalion had a total of 194 soldiers.

== Engagements ==
In June 1864, the 1st Dakota Cavalry Battalion served as guard for Brig. Gen. Alfred Sully as he traveled to Fort Sully, Dakota Territory to rendezvous with various companies there. Upon the completion of the brigade, the expedition left Fort Sully on June 24, 1864. On July 28, 1864, Sully's force of 2,200 soldiers encountered a camp of over 5,000 Sioux warriors. During the subsequent Battle of Killdeer Mountain, United States forces lost 5 men killed and 10 men wounded.

On August 13–15, 1865, 24 soldiers in Company B participated in the Battle of Bone Pile Creek against Native American warriors near present-day Wright, Wyoming. The detachment suffered two casualties, Privates Anthony Nelson and John Rouse (both killed in action).

== See also ==
- List of Dakota Territory Civil War units

== Bibliography ==
- Dyer, Frederick H. (1959) [1908]. A Compendium of the War of the Rebellion. New York, N.Y.: Sagamore Press, Inc.
- Thrapp, Dan L (1991). Encyclopedia of Frontier Biography, 3 Volumes. University of Nebraska Press. p. 1698. ISBN 978-0-8032-9420-2.
- Carley, Kenneth (2001). The Dakota War of 1862. Minnesota Historical Society Press. ISBN 978-0-87351-392-0.
- Lounsberry, Clement Augustus (1919). Early History of North Dakota. Washington, DC: Liberty Press.
- Robinson, Doane; State Historical Society (1904). South Dakota Historical Collections: a History of the Dakota or Sioux Indians. Aberdeen, SD: News Print Co.
- Armstrong, Moses Kimball (1901). The Early Empire Builders of the Great West. St Paul, MN: E.W. Porter.
- English, Abner M (1899–1902). Dakota's First Soldiers: History of the 1st Dakota Cavalry, 1861-65. Yankton, SD: Monthly South Dakotan.
- Clodfelter, Micheal The Dakota War: The United States Army Versus the Sioux, 1862-1865 McFarland, 2006 ISBN 0-7864-2726-4
