= George Bent =

Cheyenne-Anglo Confederate soldier

- Ho-my-ike
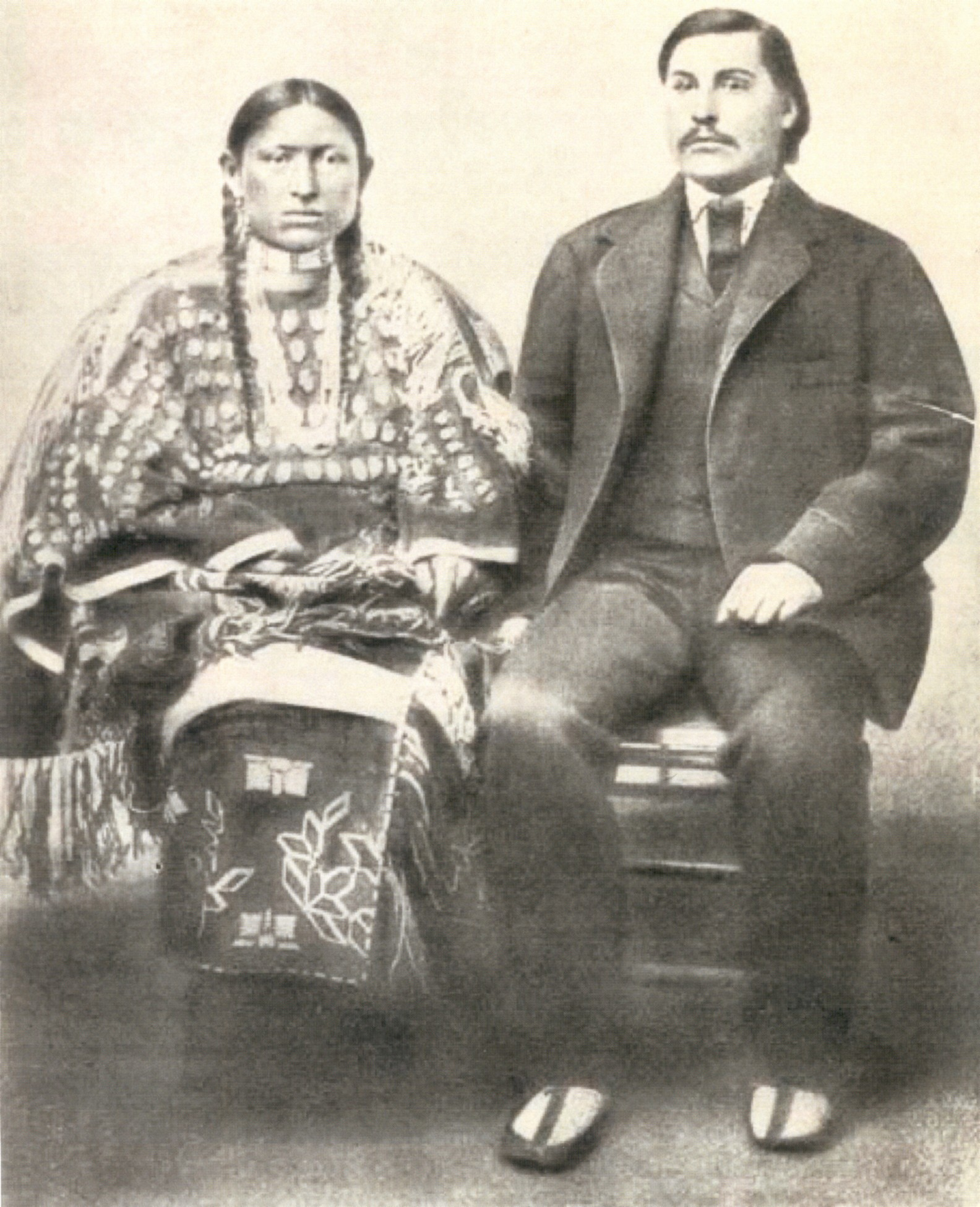
- George Bent and his first wife Magpie (Mo-he-by-vah), in 1867.
- Born: c. 1843; Otero County, Colorado, United States
- Died: May 19, 1918 (aged 75); Washita, Caddo County, Oklahoma, United States
- Burial place: United States.
- Spouse(s): Magpie (Mo'e'háévá'e or Mo-he-by-vah), spring 1866; Kiowa Woman; Standing Out
- Children: Mary, William, Daisy, Lucy, George Jr., and Charlie
- Relatives: Owl Woman (mother); William Bent (father); White Thunder (grand-father); Tail Woman (grand-mother); Silas Bent (grand-father); Charles Bent (uncle); Silas Bent III (uncle); Edmund Guerrier (brother-in-law); Silas Bent IV (cousin); Henry C. Boggs (cousin); Charles Marion Russell (cousin)
- Military career
- Allegiance: Confederate States of America; Cheyenne; United States
- Branch: Missouri State Guard (under the Confederate States Army); Dog Soldiers
- Service years: 1861–1862 CSA, 1864–1867 Cheyenne
- Rank: Private
- Units: 1st Missouri Cavalry Regiment (CSA); Landis' Battery, Missouri Light Artillery (CSA)
- Conflicts: American Civil War: Battle of Wilson's Creek; First Battle of Lexington; Battle of Pea Ridge; Siege of Corinth; Indian Wars: Sand Creek Massacre; Battle of Julesburg; Battle of Mud Springs; Battle of Rush Creek; Battle of Platte Bridge Station; Battle of Bone Pile Creek; Battle of Dry Ford

George Bent, also named Ho-my-ike in Cheyenne (c. 1843 – May 19, 1918), was a Cheyenne-Anglo (in Cheyenne: Tsėhésevé'ho'e - ″Cheyenne-whiteman″) who became a Confederate soldier during the American Civil War and waged war against Americans as a Cheyenne warrior afterward (particularly due to the Sand Creek Massacre perpretrated by the US Army, which he survived). He was the mixed-race son of Owl Woman, daughter of White Thunder (and Tall Woman), a Cheyenne chief and keeper of the Medicine Arrows, and the American William Bent, founder of the trading post named Bent's Fort and a trading partnership with his brothers and Ceran St. Vrain. Bent was born near present-day La Junta, Colorado, and was reared among both his mother's people, his father and other European Americans at the fort, and other whites from the age of 10 while attending boarding school in St. Louis, Missouri. He identified as Cheyenne.

After the Indian Wars, Bent worked for the United States government as an interpreter. Starting in 1870 with the US Indian agent to the Cheyenne and Arapaho, he lived on the reservation in present-day Oklahoma, where he stayed to the end of his life. Although a member of the Cheyenne because he was born to his mother's clan, in the tension of the postwar years Bent felt an outsider to both Cheyenne and whites because of his dual heritage. Some Cheyenne blamed him for losses to communal land suffered by the tribe when it was forced to accept allotment of lands to individual households under the Dawes Act.

In the early twentieth century, Bent became an important source, or informant, for James Mooney and George Bird Grinnell, anthropologists studying and recording Cheyenne culture, as he was bilingual and knew the culture well. Anxious to get a book on the Cheyenne completed, Bent encouraged Grinnell to work with George E. Hyde, who probably wrote most of Grinnell's book The Fighting Cheyennes. Through Bent's letters to him, Hyde wrote his biography: Life of George Bent: Written from His Letters. It was not published until 1968.

== Early life and education ==
Bent was born at Bent's Fort, owned and operated by his father William Bent, a major fur trader from St. Louis, Missouri. His mother was Owl Woman, daughter of White Thunder (and Tall Woman), a Cheyenne chief and keeper of the Medicine Arrows, and he was born into her clan under the matrilineal kinship system. Bent and his three siblings grew up speaking both Cheyenne and English at home. He learned much about Cheyenne culture from his mother and her family, and in their culture was considered Cheyenne.

She died about 1847, by which time his father had already taken her two younger sisters as secondary wives, in the Cheyenne traditional way of successful men. The youngest, Island, essentially reared Owl Woman's four children. Yellow Woman had a son by William Bent; Charles Bent, a half-brother to the others, was born in 1845. These two women had both left William Bent by 1867. He married the 20-year-old Adaline Harvey in 1869, the educated mixed-race daughter of a fur trader friend from Kansas City. Their daughter (George's half sister) was born after William Bent's death later that year.

When George was 10 years old, his father sent him to Kansas City, to an Episcopal boarding school for a European-American education. By the time the American Civil War began, Bent was a student at Webster College for Boys (unrelated to the later Webster University) near St. Louis.

== Confederate military service ==
Bent served in the Missouri State Guard which was strongly allied with the Confederate Army. The Missouri State Guard was commanded by outgoing Missouri Governor Sterling Price, who had avenged George's uncle Charles's killing as part of the Taos Revolt during the U.S. invasion and occupation of Nuevo México as part of the Mexican-American War.

George saw fighting at the Battle of Wilson's Creek near Springfield, Missouri, on August 10, 1861; and at the First Battle of Lexington near Lexington, Missouri, on September 20, 1861; both were Confederate victories. As a member of the 1st Missouri Cavalry Regiment, he fought at the Battle of Pea Ridge in Arkansas, March 6–8, 1862, which was a Union victory. When the Missouri cavalry was converted to infantry, Bent became attached to Landis' Battery, Missouri Light Artillery, the horse artillery of General Martin E. Green's Missouri Brigade; this was part of General Sterling Price's division. His artillery unit participated in the siege and retreat from Corinth, Mississippi, where it stayed behind to cover the retreat of 66,000 Confederates under the command of P.G.T. Beauregard.

Later that summer, Bent either was captured or deserted. After his return to St. Louis, which was Union-controlled, he was briefly confined in the Gratiot Street Prison, but was allowed to swear an oath of allegiance to the Union and be released. His guardian, Robert Campbell, a prominent St. Louis citizen assigned to him when George was in school, had eased his way.

Bent returned to his father's ranch in Colorado Territory, but anti-Confederate sentiment was intense there. For safety, he went to live with his maternal Cheyenne relatives. From that time on, Bent lived among the Cheyenne and identified with them.

== Sand Creek Massacre and aftermath ==
Bent had helped draft the letters sent by Cheyenne chief Black Kettle to Major Edward Wynkoop at Fort Lyon in Colorado to propose a return of settler hostages if discussions would take place about a peace treaty with Black Kettle's band. This led to four hostages (a young woman and three children) being returned, and to Black Kettle and other Cheyenne chiefs being escorted into Denver to start negotiations with the Governor. Bent was at Black Kettle's camp of Cheyenne and Arapaho at Sand Creek about 35 miles (56 km) north of Lamar, Colorado, on November 29, 1864. The Indians in the camp had initiated peace negotiations with the U.S. Army, and believed they were under its protection, but Colonel John Chivington and his force of 700 Colorado volunteers attacked the village. They killed about 150 Indians. Bent's brother Charles was nearly killed by the soldiers, but was rescued by friends. Jack Smith, another young mixed-race Cheyenne man, was killed in the soldiers' attack.

Bent was among the Indians who fled upstream and found shelter in sandpits dug in the creek bed beneath a high bank. Wounded in the hip, he was with about 100 survivors who crossed the plains to the Indian camps on the Smoky Hill River. He was found there by his friend Edmund Guerrier, who accompanied him back to the Bent Ranch at Big Timbers, where Bent recovered. The Cheyenne and Arapaho planned revenge for the Sand Creek Massacre.

The Bent brothers and Charles' mother Yellow Woman joined the Dog Soldiers band. In January 1865, the young men rode with an Indian army of 1,000 warriors in a successful attack on Julesburg, Colorado, in which they killed many townspeople and soldiers. (See Battle of Julesburg) Most of the Cheyenne went north to join Red Cloud on the Powder River in Wyoming. Before leaving the area, they burned many homesteads in the South Platte River valley. "At night the whole valley was lighted up with the flames of burning ranches and stage stations, but these places were soon destroyed and darkness fell on the valley."

Throughout 1865, George Bent fought with Cheyennes, participating in the Battle of Mud Springs, and the Battle of Rush Creek, near present-day Broadwater, Nebraska, the Battle of Platte Bridge Station/Red Buttes on July 26, 1865, near present-day Casper, Wyoming, and the three-day Battle of Bone Pile Creek in August, near present-day Wright, Wyoming. In the summer, the U.S. Army sent the Powder River Expedition, under Brigadier General Patrick E. Connor into the Powder River Country to punish the Sioux, Cheyenne, and Arapaho, with orders to kill all men and boys over the age of 12. On September 8, 1865, the Bents were camped with the Cheyenne at the confluence of the Big and Little Powder Rivers, near present-day Broadus, Montana, when soldiers were sighted only a few miles away. The soldiers were the Eastern and Central columns of the Powder River Expedition under Colonel Nelson D. Cole, and Brevet Brigadier General Samuel Walker respectively. The Cheyennes led by Roman Nose, attacked the moving column to protect their village, in what would later be called the Battle of Dry Creek/Ford, or Roman Nose's Fight, possibly preventing another Sand Creek Massacre.

Bent later wrote about this period, saying he believed that the "savages" in the conflict were the U.S. soldiers. Bent participated in 27 Cheyenne war parties, but never gave many details about his personal role in the Indian wars.

George's brother Charles was described and pictured in the March 1868 edition of Harper's Magazine.

Many Dog Soldiers, including George's brother Charles, were killed in 1869, at the Battle of Summit Springs in Colorado.

== Interpreter ==
Bent began his return to a peaceful world as an interpreter at the Medicine Lodge Treaty Council of October 1867. Bent impressed the U.S. soldiers and officials with his negotiating skills. Soon after, his brother Charles, a well-known and feared Cheyenne warrior, was killed in a skirmish with soldiers.

In 1868, Bent was hired by the U.S. government as an interpreter, first at Fort Larned and later for the newly created Indian Agency headed by Brinton Darlington, the first US Indian Agent for the Cheyenne and Arapaho. In 1870, the Agency was located at El Reno, Oklahoma. Bent lived on the Cheyenne and Arapaho reservation near the town of Colony and worked as a U.S. government employee for most of the rest of his life.

Because of his knowledge of both European-American and Cheyenne culture, Bent became a prominent and powerful person on the reservation. During the first several years, he tried to moderate hostilities between the two cultures. He learned that, as a half-breed or mixed-race man, he was an outsider to both.

Bent developed a serious problem with alcohol during this period. He became prosperous by assisting European-American cattlemen to obtain grazing leases on Indian land. Because of his influence peddling, he lost the trust of some Cheyenne and was fired as a U.S. interpreter. But in 1890, he was the crucial go-between to persuade the Cheyenne and Arapaho to accept plans for allotment of land by individual households under the Dawes Act. Presented as a way for Indians to assimilate by adopting Euro-American farming styles, the allotment plan caused the loss of considerable tribal land. The former communal tribal land was allocated to households of members, and any remaining land was declared "surplus" by the government, making it available for sale to non-Indian parties. Many Cheyenne and Arapaho held Bent responsible for the ill effects of the transition to allotments, including the loss of substantial amounts of tribal lands from the reservation. Allotment would have happened without Bent's assistance, but he was considered partially responsible.

== Family ==
Bent was married three times. In the spring of 1866, he first married Magpie (Mo-he-by-vah; May 10, 1886), a niece (raised as a daughter) of Black Kettle of the Southern Cheyenne tribe. As a marriage gift, Black Kettle gave George the fine bay horse that General William S. Harney had given Black Kettle during the negotiations preceding the Little Arkansas Treaty when Black Kettle's wife showed her nine wounds from the Sand Creek Massacre.

His other wives were Kiowa Woman (d. 1913) and Standing Out (d. 1945). With them Bent had a total of six children: Mary, William, Daisy, Lucy, George Jr., and Charlie. Daisy gave birth to a child named Smoke Woman and from her lineage came some of the recent and present Chiefs of the Southern Cheyenne.

== Cheyenne historian ==
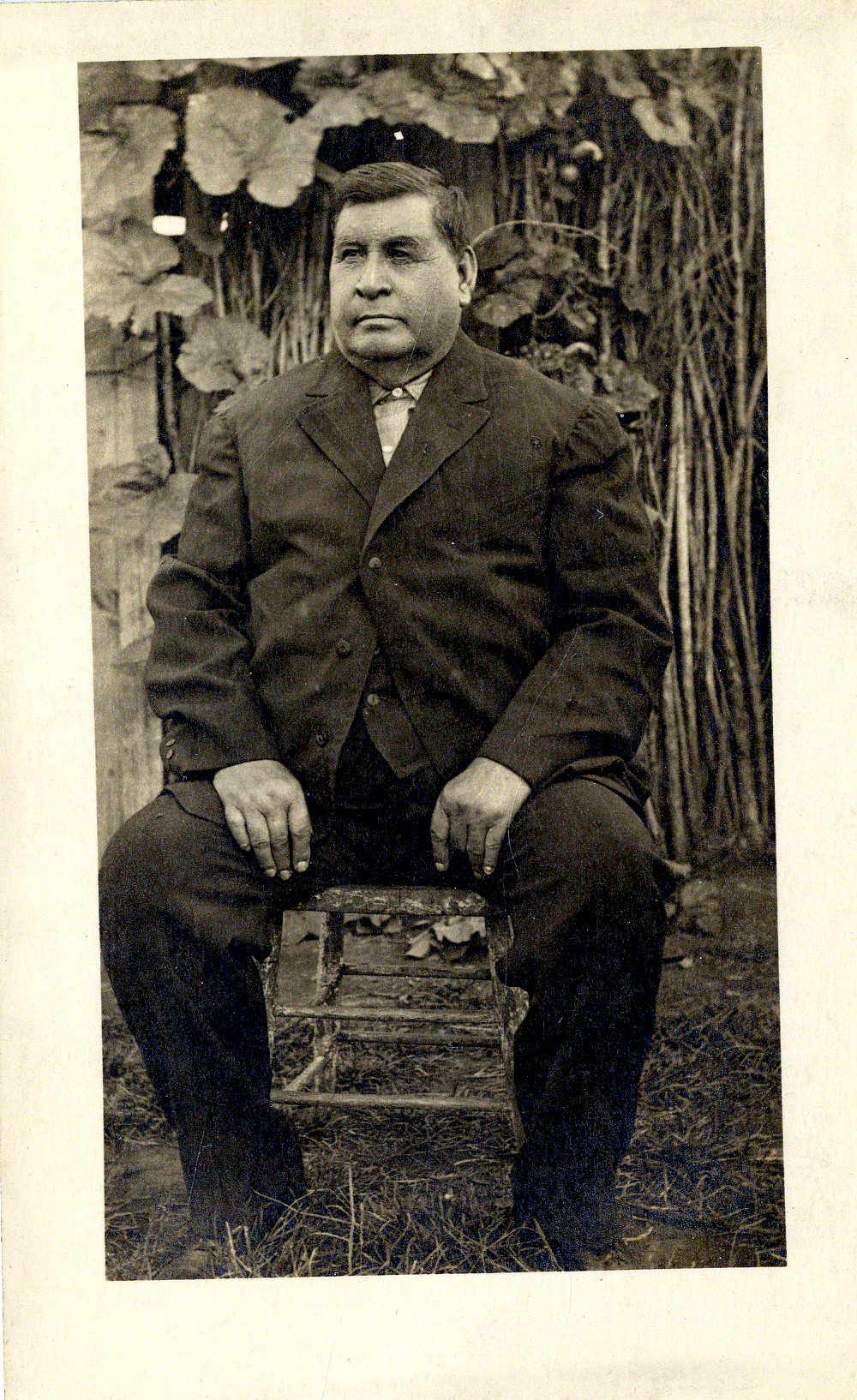
George Bent Oct/22/1916

By 1901 Bent was at a low stage in his life. He had stopped drinking, but his influence with the Cheyenne was largely gone, as was his earlier prosperity. His meeting with the anthropologist George Bird Grinnell was beneficial for both. Grinnell realized that Bent, who spoke both Cheyenne and English, was literate, and could write passable English, would be invaluable for his research into Cheyenne culture. (Bent had been an informant of James Mooney earlier, but he had little respect for Mooney.) Bent told Grinnell what he knew and arranged interviews with other Cheyenne for what he did not know.

He wanted the story of the Cheyenne told in a book. In Bent's opinion, Grinnell was too slow to finish his book about the Cheyenne. Bent began collaborating with the deaf, nearly blind, and reclusive George E. Hyde. Eventually, at Bent's recommendation, Hyde became a ghost writer for Grinnell and probably wrote most of The Fighting Cheyennes, published in 1915. Grinnell mentioned Bent as a source in the book, but did not give him full credit for his assistance and contributions. Later, Grinnell wrote The Cheyenne Indians: Their History and Lifeways, in which he was more generous in crediting Bent. Cheyenne culture is unusually well described in Grinnell's books, thanks largely to Bent's insights and Hyde's writing.

Although the two never met, Hyde and Bent became close collaborators. Bent wrote 340 letters to Hyde between 1904 and 1918. From these letters, Hyde distilled a book, Life of George Bent: Written from His Letters. Hyde finished the book but, still unknown in the anthropological fraternity, he could not find a publisher. Hyde and Bent's collaboration is the principal source for the Cheyenne side of the wars of the 1860s and subsequent events.

Bent died on May 19, 1918, at Washita, Oklahoma in the 1918 flu pandemic. At the time, his dream of a well-written book about the history and culture of the Cheyenne was unrealized.

In 1968, George E. Hyde's book Life of George Bent: Written from His Letters was published, and in 2005, David F. Halaas and Andrew E. Masich published Halfbreed: The Remarkable True Story of George Bent-- Caught Between the Worlds of the Indian and the White Man.
