= William Tripp (politician) =

American politician

William Tripp (November 29, 1817 probably in Bethel, Maine – March 29, 1878 in Dakota Territory) was an American politician, lawyer, soldier, and surveyor who served in the Maine Senate before moving to Iowa and South Dakota.

Tripp's father, also named William Tripp, was a farmer and minister. He married Lucy Tebbets on January 3, 1814, and William Tripp was their second child. After attending the Maine Wesleyan Seminary, he studied law and was admitted to the bar at the age of twenty-one. A Democrat, he or his father represented Harmony in the Maine House of Representatives in 1841; he represented Wilton in the Maine Senate in 1848–9, becoming Senate President in 1849. In 1852 he was serving as county attorney for Franklin County, a Justice of the Peace, and a Brigadier General (Second Brigade, Eighth Division) of the Maine Militia.

In 1852 he left Maine and settled in Dubuque, Iowa, where he practiced law. In 1857 he moved to Sioux City, Iowa. At the beginning of the Civil War, he became the commander of Company B of the 1st Dakota Cavalry, serving under General Alfred Sully on the frontier. By 1862 he was living in Yankton in the Dakota Territory; the first meeting of the Upper House of the Territorial Legislature, in March 1862, occurred at his house there. From 1866 to 1869 he served as Surveyor General for the Dakota Territory under President Andrew Johnson. In 1869 he formed a law firm in Yankton with his younger half-brother Bartlett Tripp, later a judge and diplomat.

Tripp played a part in the story of the first man officially convicted and jailed by the Dakota Territory. A man named Frank Sullivan was brought to Yankton in October 1870, accused of stealing horses from the Indians. William Tripp managed to get him acquitted. However, while working for William's half-brother Bartlett, Sullivan forged an order for a suit of clothes and fled when his crime was discovered. Brought back to Yankton, he escaped the jail and stole a horse from William Tripp. He was once more captured, while trying to use another forged order, this time from William Tripp, brought back, convicted, and sent to prison in December 1871.

William Tripp and his half-brother Bartlett were both defense lawyers in the 1874 trial of Peter Wintermute for the murder of acting governor Edwin Stanton McCook. William was called as a witness at the trial.

== Family ==
Tripp married Sarah Adams Woods (1819-1897) in 1841 and had at least two children - William Wallace Tripp (1843-1863) and Flora Louisa Tripp Voter (1849-1913). Tripp and his wife were divorced in 1862 by act of the Dakota legislature. Tripp then married Martha Atwood (1822-1905) and had three children, two of whom died in infancy, and a son, Henry Tripp (1865-1933).
