= List of Dakota Territory units in the American Civil War =

The Dakota Territory during the American Civil War raised only a battalion of cavalry, 2 companies, for three year service for the Union. They remained in the territory for defense of the frontier lands during the Dakota War.

Unit	Composition
1st Dakota Cavalry Battalion	Companies A and B

== See also ==
- Lists of American Civil War Regiments by State

== Bibliography ==
- Dyer, Frederick H. (1959). A Compendium of the War of the Rebellion. New York and London. Thomas Yoseloff, Publisher. LCCN 59-12963
