= Battle of Warbonnet Creek =

Battle of the Great Sioux War of 1876

Coordinates: 42°55′40″N 103°43′47″W

- Part of the Great Sioux War of 1876
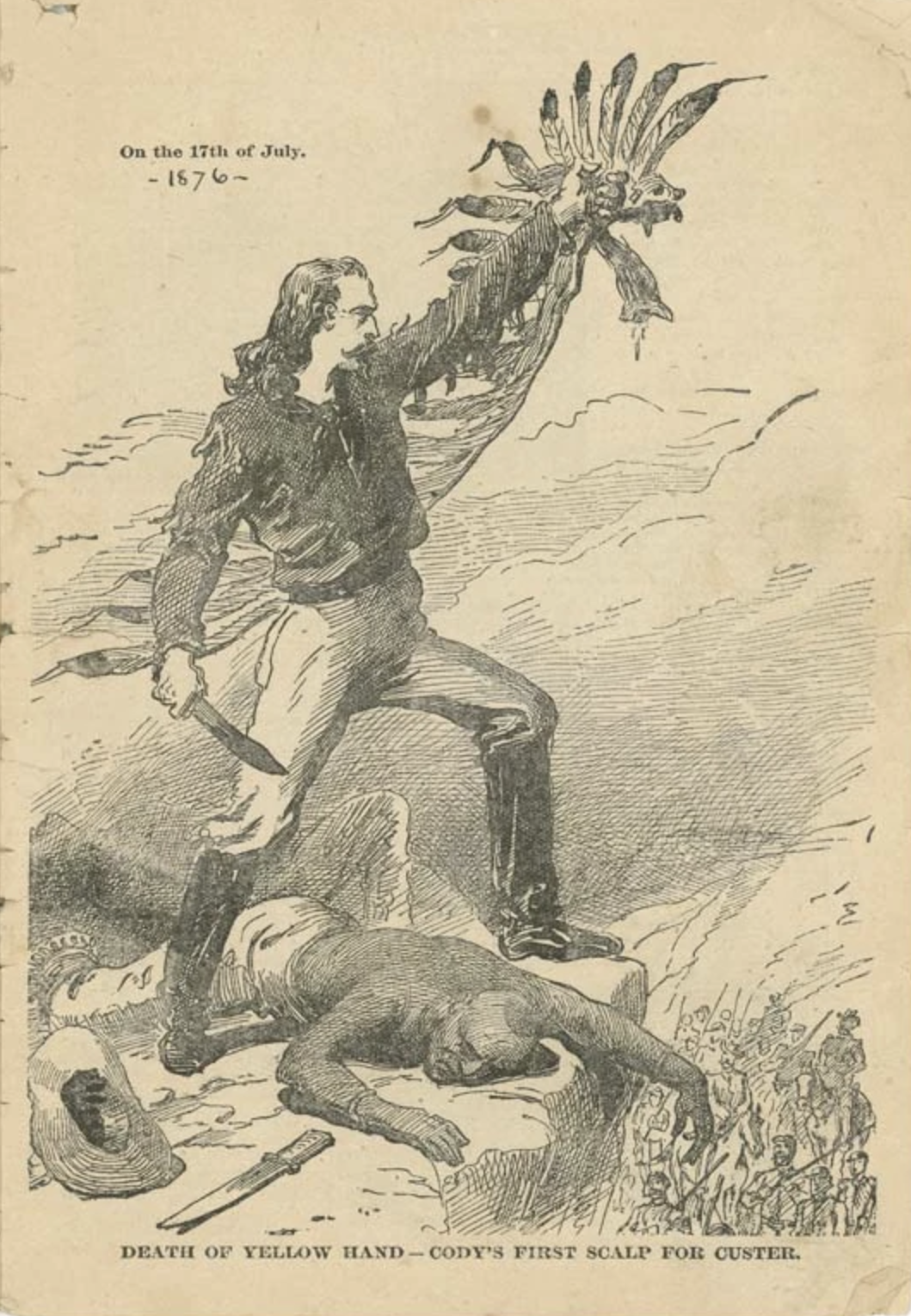
- Illustration of the "first scalp for Custer" for Buffalo Bill's Wild West, 1884
Date	July 17, 1876
Location	Sioux County, Nebraska
Result	United States victory

Belligerents
Cheyenne	United States

Commanders and leaders
Little Wolf	(United States) Wesley Merritt

Strength
~200–300	~350

Casualties and losses
1 killed Unknown wounded	None

The Battle of Warbonnet Creek was a skirmish characterized by a duel between "Buffalo Bill" Cody and a young Cheyenne warrior named Heova'ehe or Yellow Hair (often incorrectly translated as "Yellow Hand"). The engagement is often referred to as the First Scalp for Custer. It occurred July 17, 1876, in Sioux County in northwestern Nebraska.

== Background ==
After the defeat of Gen. George A. Custer at the Battle of the Little Big Horn, many Native Americans joined with Sitting Bull and Crazy Horse, encouraged by the Indians' success. About 200-300 Cheyenne warriors led by Morning Star (also known as Dull Knife) set out with their families from the Spotted Tail and Red Cloud agencies in Nebraska.

The United States Army had sent the 5th Cavalry Regiment, commanded by Lt. Col. Eugene Asa Carr, from Oklahoma to a position on the Cheyenne River in South Dakota to guard against such an occurrence. Carr was replaced in command on July 1 by Col. Wesley Merritt, and when news of the Battle of the Little Big Horn reached Gen. George Crook on July 5, the 5th Cavalry was ordered to reinforce Crook on Goose Creek in Wyoming.

== Engagement ==
Word of the breakout of the Cheyenne also reached Merritt and, guided by "Buffalo Bill" Cody, he was able to intercept the Cheyenne warriors.

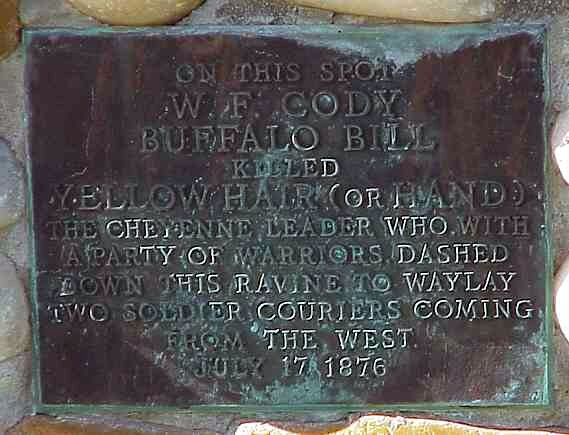
Marker at Warbonnet Creek site.

Merritt planned an ambush. He hid most of his 350 troopers inside covered wagons and posted sharpshooters nearby out of sight. Spotting Merritt's seemingly unescorted wagon train along Warbonnet Creek, a small war party of six Cheyenne warriors charged directly into the trap to divert attention from the main body of Cheyenne.

A few warriors were wounded by the troopers, but the only real action of the engagement was a "duel" between Buffalo Bill and a Cheyenne chief, Yellow Hair. Cody shot and killed the Indian with his Winchester carbine, then pulled out a Bowie knife and scalped him.

The main body of warriors attempted to rescue the small war party, but fled so quickly after seeing the true strength of the U.S. forces that not a single trooper was killed or injured.

== Aftermath ==
Merritt joined Crook, whose expedition later linked up with that of Gen. Alfred H. Terry, bringing the combined strength of the U.S. force to about 4,000.

Ever the showman, Buffalo Bill returned to the stage in October, his show highlighted by a melodramatic reenactment of his duel with Yellow Hair. He displayed the fallen warrior's scalp, feather war bonnet, knife, saddle and other personal effects. He later often celebrated the killing during his Wild West shows in a reenactment he entitled "The Red Right Hand, or, Buffalo Bill's First Scalp for Custer".

== See also ==
- List of battles fought in Nebraska
