= Battle of Bone Pile Creek =

- Part of the Powder River Expedition, Sioux Wars
Date	August 13–15, 1865
Location	present-day Campbell County, Wyoming
Result	Inconclusive

Belligerents
United States	Cheyenne; Oglala Lakota Sioux

Commanders and leaders
(United States) James A. Sawyers (United States) George Williford	Red Cloud; Dull Knife

Strength
143 Soldiers, 53 Civilians	~500 Warriors

Casualties and losses
3 killed	2 killed, 3 wounded

The Battle of Bone Pile Creek, part of the Powder River Expedition, was fought August 13–15, 1865, by United States soldiers and civilians against Sioux and Cheyenne warriors. The battle occurred near Bone Pile Creek, in Dakota Territory, in present-day Campbell County, Wyoming.

== Battle ==
On August 13, 1865, the soldiers, civilians, and wagon train of Lieutenant Colonel James A. Sawyers' Expedition were moving west. The soldiers accompanying the train included twenty four men of Company B, 1st Dakota Cavalry Battalion, and about 119 men of Companies C, and D, 5th United States Volunteer Infantry under Captain George Williford, of Company C. In the evening near Gourd (also called Pumpkin) Butte, Cheyenne and Sioux warriors attacked the train, killing Nathaniel Hedges, a 19-year-old civilian employee. Later that evening, the wagons were corralled near Bone Pile Creek, and Hedges was buried in the center of the corral. The next morning, the warriors returned and attacked again. They again attacked the corralled wagons on the fifteenth, but could not overrun the wagons. Chief Red Cloud of the Sioux, chief Morning Star (Dull Knife), and George Bent of the Cheyenne, and Bull Bear negotiated with Colonel Sawyers for a safe passage of the wagon train in exchange for one wagon's load of supplies. Soldiers later reported that George Bent was dressed in a U.S. army staff officer's uniform. Sawyers agreed to give the supplies, which included a wagon full of sugar, bacon, coffee, flour, and tobacco, though Captain Williford objected to the idea. When the wagons began moving again, the Indians attacked, killing Privates Anthony Nelson, and John Rouse of Company B, 1st Dakota Cavalry. The soldiers fired back, killing two warriors, and the Native Americans quickly withdrew from the wagons. After burying Private Nelson beside Nathaniel Hedges, and being unable to locate the body of Private Rouse, the Sawyers Expedition continued on.

== The battlefield today ==
The Bone Pile Creek battlefield is at an unknown location in Campbell County, Wyoming, near present-day Wright, Wyoming.

== Order of battle ==
United States Army, Lieutenant Colonel James A. Sawyers, 196 men.

Expedition	Commander	Companies and Others
Sawyers Expedition	Lieutenant Colonel James A. Sawyers 196 men	1st Dakota Cavalry Battalion, (Detachment Company B, 24 men): 5th United States Volunteer Infantry, (Companies C, and D, about 119 men): Captain George Williford, Company C.; Civilians, 53 men.; 56 wagons and 90 oxen

Native Americans, 500 Sioux and Cheyenne.

Native Americans	Tribe	Leaders
Native Americans	Lakota Sioux 500 Warriors	Red Cloud
Native Americans	Northern and Southern Cheyenne	Dull Knife; Roman Nose; George Bent; Charles Bent; Bull Bear
