= Battle of Rush Creek =

Colorado War battle

- Part of the Colorado War
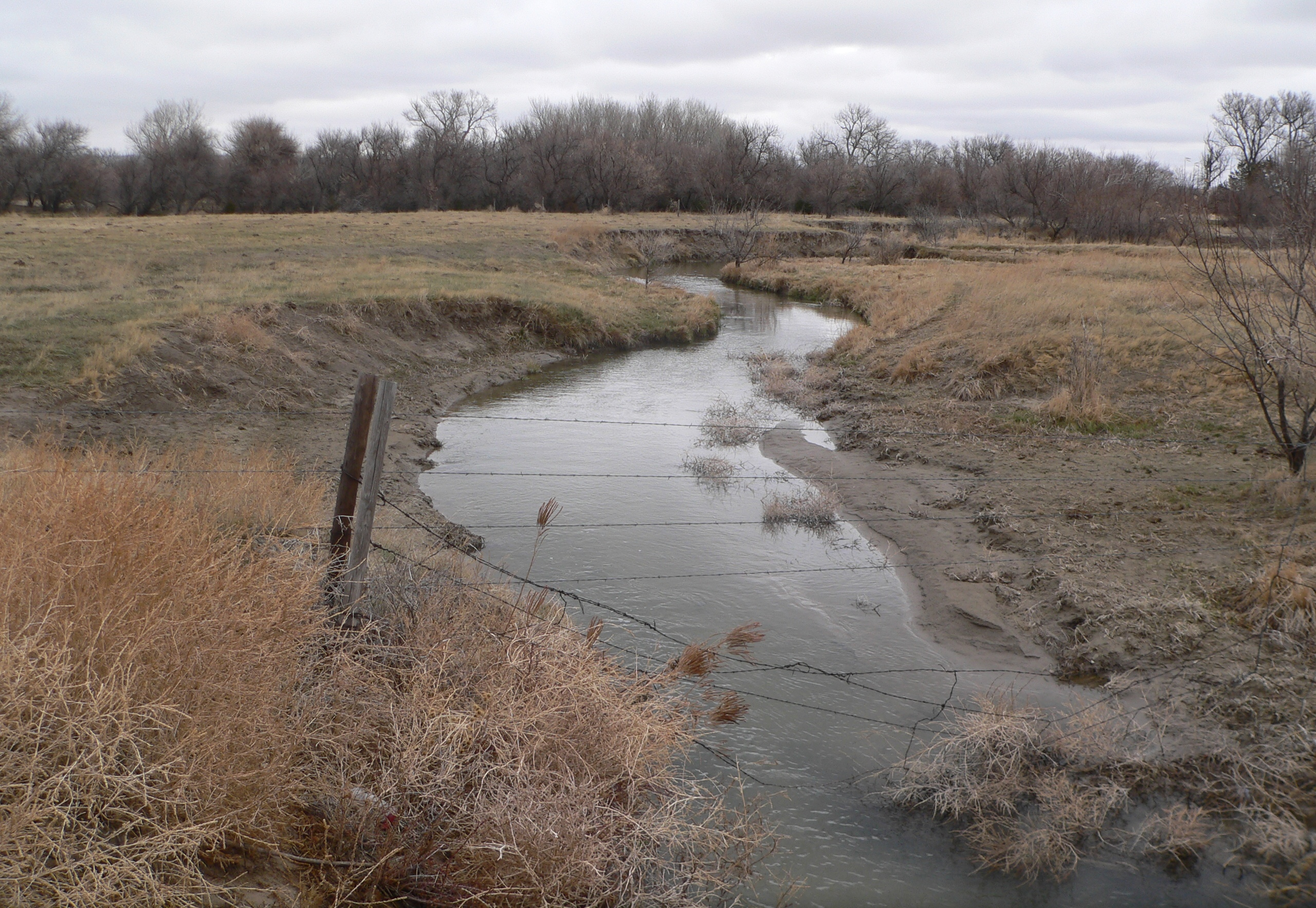
- Cedar Creek, formerly Rush Creek, near its confluence with the North Platte
Date	February 8–9, 1865
Location	Morrill County, Nebraska
Result	Inconclusive

Belligerents
United States Army	Cheyenne, Lakota Sioux, and Arapaho tribes

Commanders and leaders
Lt. Col. William O. Collins	George Bent

Strength
185 soldiers	1,000 warriors

Casualties and losses
2–3 killed, 9 wounded	1+ killed, 2 wounded

The Battle of Rush Creek took place February 8–9, 1865, between about 185 soldiers of the U.S. Army and 1,000 warriors of the Lakota Sioux, Cheyenne, and Arapaho tribes. It was part of a series of retaliations by the Native American alliance after the U.S. army committed the Sand Creek Massacre. The inconclusive battle took place 4 mi southeast of present-day Broadwater, Nebraska, along both banks of the North Platte River.

== Background ==
After the Sand Creek Massacre in November 1864 in Colorado, the Plains Indians of the three tribes in that region decided to move northward to the more isolated Powder River Country of Wyoming and Montana. En route, they sought revenge for Sand Creek, raiding along the South Platte River in Colorado and burning the settlement of Julesburg on February 2. From February 4–6, the Indians attacked a stagecoach station in the Battle of Mud Springs. Breaking off that battle to resume their journey northward, they crossed the North Platte River on the ice and camped among bluffs about 5 mi north of the river.

Lt. Col. William O. Collins and soldiers from his command, variously reported from 140 to 185, left Mud Springs on February 8 to find the Indians, who may have numbered, with women and children, from 4,000 to 5,000. The food and other provisions the Indians had collected in their raids enabled such a large number to remain together rather than divide into smaller groups for hunting. On Rush Creek (today Cedar Creek), Collins found their previous encampment scattered over several miles of the creek valley and littered with the plunder from their raids, including empty cans of oysters, meat, and fruit. He followed the trail northward to the North Platte, where across the river, he saw Indians grazing their large herd of horses.

The Indians had not anticipated that the outnumbered soldiers would pursue them, and had set up their camp intending to remain there four days to rest their horses before undertaking a waterless 40-mile passage through the Nebraska Sand Hills. The young men and women had spent all night dancing and were asleep, but were awakened suddenly at 2:00 pm, when a single Sioux warrior signaled from a hilltop that soldiers were approaching. About 1000 warriors mounted their horses and crossed the flat Platte Valley to engage the soldiers.

== Battle ==
Collins saw the large number of Indians coming his way and formed up his wagons and horses into a corral, putting his soldiers to work digging rifle pits and establishing defense lines among the sandy ridges on the plain. The Indians crossed the North Platte above and below the troops and advanced, attempting to capture the soldiers' horses, forcing the soldiers to fight on foot. A long-distance shooting match ensued. Barrages from a howitzer kept the Indians at a distance, although many of the shells were defective.

One group of Indians crept close enough to be a danger and Collins ordered a detail of 17 men under Lt. Patton of the 11th Ohio Cavalry to charge and disperse them. Collins reported that the mounted charge was successful, although two men were killed, one of whom was Pvt. William H. Hartshorn of Company C, 11th Ohio Cavalry, whose body was recovered containing 97 arrows. George Bent, a Cheyenne warrior, said that the soldiers retreated in haste and with many casualties after a counter-charge by Indians (a young Cheyenne named Yellow Nose was wounded in the action. Eleven years later, Yellow Nose captured Lt. Col. George A. Custer's flag during the Battle of the Little Bighorn). The Indians withdrew in the late afternoon. Collins' force remained in their defensive positions overnight. The next morning, several hundred Indian warriors returned to resume the attack on Collins and to attempt again capturing his horses. After long-distance sniping for several hours, the Indians broke off the battle.

Collins reported two men killed and nine wounded, with another 10 men suffering frostbite. He estimated the Indian casualties at Mud Springs and Rush Creek at 100–150. Bent, by contrast, says only two Indians were wounded at Rush Creek. Collins, however, tells a detailed story of one Indian who died in the battle; Bent tells an equally detailed story of a third soldier, a courier, being killed.

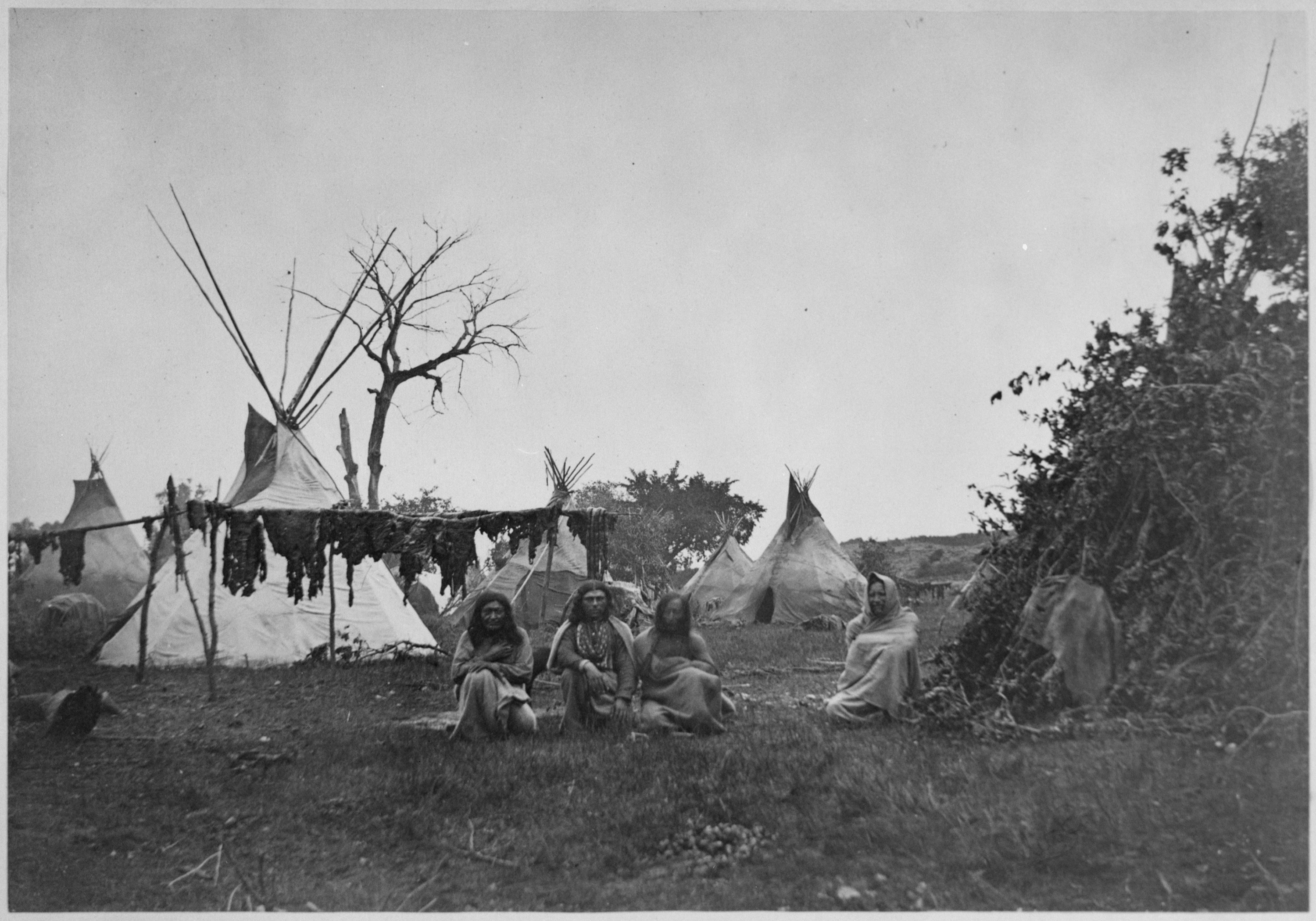
An Arapaho camp in Oklahoma, circa 1870: Buffalo meat is drying on the racks. About 80 lodges (~400 Arapaho) were with the thousands of Cheyenne and Lakota in the journey northward.

== Aftermath ==
The Sioux, Cheyenne, and Arapaho broke camp February 9 and set off northward, while many of the men were still keeping Collins pinned down. Collins did not continue his pursuit, stating that it would have been "injudicious and useless." On February 10, he began the journey back to Fort Laramie. In 10 days his men and he had ridden nearly 400 miles, fought two battles, and were exhausted and suffering from cold and lack of food. Public opinion was that the battle had dealt a severe blow to the Indians. However, a soldier commented that the Indians were "well armed, well mounted, cunning and brave." Another said that catching the Indians was easy, but "we had a terribly hard time letting them go".

The Indians crossed the Sand Hills in two long, difficult days and angled westward toward the Powder River. They sent envoys ahead to inform their fellow tribesmen in that region of their arrival. Once they were certain that soldiers were not on their trail, the large caravan broke up into tribal units, with each joining its own northern relatives. They had no further clashes with soldiers until June.

The march of the Indians north from Sand Creek to the Powder River Country was "an amazing feat," in the words of George E. Hyde.

These Indians had moved 400 miles during the worst weather of a severe winter through open, desolate plains taking with them their women and children, lodges, and household property, their vast herds of ponies, and the herds of captured cattle, horses, and mules. On the way, they had killed more whites than the number of Cheyenne killed at Sand Creek and had completely destroyed 100 miles of the Overland Stage Line.

— George E. Hyde

== Archaeology ==
The battle site was discovered in the summer of 2008, when local residents led a University of Nebraska–Lincoln archaeological field school group, led by faculty members Peter Bleed and Doug Scott, to a possible site. During the summer field seasons of 2008–09, over 225 artifacts were found, persuading the researchers that they had, in fact, found the location of the battle.

The site was listed in the National Register of Historic Places under the name "Rush Creek Battlefield" in 2011.

== See also ==
- List of battles fought in Nebraska
