= The Cheyenne Indians: Their History and Lifeways =

2008 book by Bird Grinnell

- Author: George Bird Grinnell
- Language: English
- Genre: Native American
- Publisher: World Wisdom
- Publication date: 2008
- Publication place: United States
- Media type: Print (Hardback & Paperback)
- Pages: 240 pages
- ISBN: 978-1-933316-60-4
- OCLC: 221149750
- Dewey Decimal: 978.004/97353 22
- LC Class: E99.C53 G77 2008

The Cheyenne Indians: Their History and Lifeways (2008, World Wisdom) is a condensed version of a two volume non-fiction book (The Cheyenne Indians: Their History and Ways of Life) written by the anthropologist George Bird Grinnell, based on his account of his time spent among the last of the nomadic Cheyenne Native Americans. It is one of Grinnell’s best known works and is of historical significance for its intimate first-hand account of life among the Cheyenne.

== See also ==
- George Bird Grinnell
- Native American Studies

== External links and further reading ==
- Official Book Page
- The Cheyenne Indians, Vol. 1: History and Society, (Bison Books, 1972) ISBN 978-0-8032-5771-9
- The Cheyenne Indians, Vol. 2: War, Ceremonies, and Religion, (Bison Books, 1972) ISBN 978-0-8032-5772-6
