= George Bird Grinnell =

American anthropologist (1849–1938)

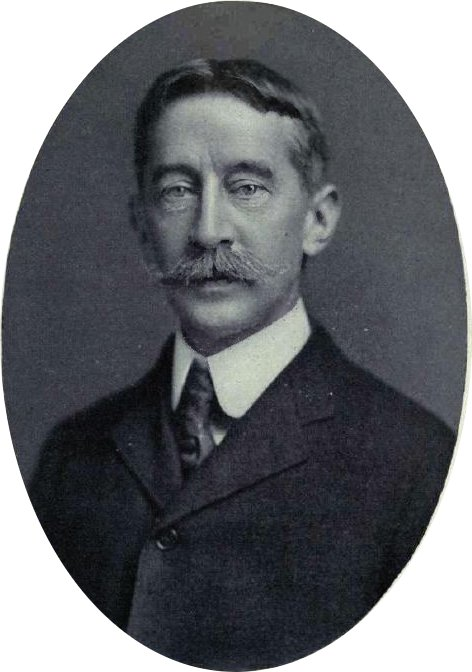
- Grinnell in 1905
- Born: September 20, 1849; Brooklyn, New York, U.S.
- Died: April 11, 1938 (aged 88); New York City, U.S.

Signature
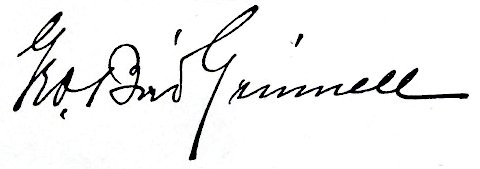

George Bird Grinnell (September 20, 1849 – April 11, 1938) was an American anthropologist, historian, naturalist, and writer. Originally specializing in zoology, he became a prominent early conservationist and student of Native American life. Grinnell has been recognized for his influence on public opinion and work on legislation to preserve the American bison. Mount Grinnell in Glacier National Park in Montana is named after him.

== Early life and education ==
Grinnell was born on September 20, 1849, in Brooklyn, New York, the son of George Blake and Helen Lansing Grinnell.

The family moved when he was seven to Audubon Park, the section of Washington Heights in Manhattan which was developed from the estate after noted ornithologist John James Audubon's death in 1851.

Grinnell graduated from Yale University with a B.A. in 1870 and a Ph.D. in 1880.

== Exploration and conservation ==
=== Scientist and naturalist ===
Grinnell had extensive contact with the terrain, animals and Native Americans of the northern plains; after receiving his degree, Grinnell obtained a position in 1870 with an expedition of the Peabody Museum at New Haven to collect vertebrate fossils in the West for six months.

He became friendly with, and was able to take part in the last great hunt of the Pawnee in 1872.

He spent many years studying the natural history of the region.

As a Yale graduate student, he accompanied Lieutenant Colonel George Armstrong Custer's 1874 Black Hills expedition as a naturalist. (He later declined a similar invitation for the ill-fated 1876 Little Big Horn expedition.)

In 1875, Colonel William Ludlow, who had been part of Custer's gold exploration effort, invited Grinnell to serve as naturalist and mineralogist on an expedition to Montana and the newly established Yellowstone Park.

He was also a member of the Edward Henry Harriman expedition of 1899, a two-month survey of the Alaskan coast by an elite group of scientists and artists.

=== Writer, editor, and public intellectual ===
Grinnell prepared an attachment to the expedition's report, in which he documented the poaching of buffalo, deer, elk and antelope for hides. "It is estimated that during the winter of 1874-1875, not less than 3,000 Buffalo and mule deer suffer even more severely than the elk, and the antelope nearly as much."

His experience in Yellowstone led Grinnell to write the first of many magazine articles dealing with conservation, the protection of the buffalo, and the American West.

From 1880 to 1911, he served as editor and president of the weekly Forest and Stream, and wrote articles and lobbied for congressional support for the endangered American buffalo.

Besides being editor of Forest and Stream, he contributed many articles and essays to other magazines, books, and professional publications, including:

- "In Buffalo Days", in American Big-Game Hunting, edited by Theodore Roosevelt and George Bird Grinnell, New York, 1893.
- "The Bison," in Musk-Ox, Bison, Sheep and Goat, edited by Caspar Whitney, George Bird Grinnell, and Owen Wister, New York, 1904 American Sportsman's Library.

=== Conservation organizer and policy influencer ===
Grinnell was prominent in movements to preserve wildlife and conservation in the American West.

In 1887, Grinnell was a founding member, with Theodore Roosevelt, of the Boone and Crockett Club, dedicated to the restoration of America's wildlands. Other founding members included General William Tecumseh Sherman and Gifford Pinchot. Grinnell and Roosevelt published the club's first book in 1895.

Grinnell also organized the first Audubon Society and was an organizer of the New York Zoological Society.

With the passage of the 1894 National Park Protective Act, the remaining 200 wild buffalo in Yellowstone National Park received a measure of protection. It was nearly too late for the species. Poaching continued to reduce the animal's population, which reached its lowest number of 23 in 1902.

Grinnell's actions led to ongoing efforts by the Department of Interior to find additional animals in the wild and to manage herds to supplement the Yellowstone herd. This ultimately led to a genetically pure viable herd, and the survival of the species.

=== Glacier region exploration and national parks advocacy ===
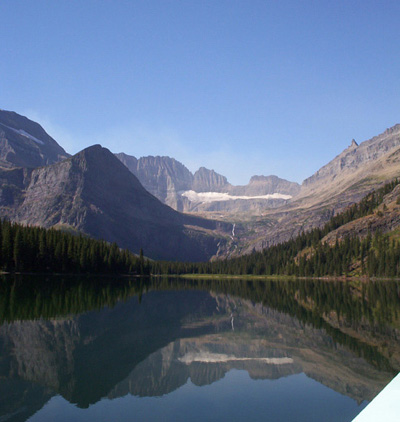
The Salamander Glacier and Lake Josephine, Glacier National Park. The Salamander used to be part of Grinnell Glacier but was named in the mid-20th century after Grinnell dwindled and split in two. Lying immediately beneath the Salamander, Grinnell Glacier is not visible in this photograph.

Grinnell made hunting trips to the St. Mary Lakes region of what is now Glacier National Park in 1885, 1887 and 1891 in the company of James Willard Schultz, the first professional guide in the region.

During the 1885 visit, Grinnell and Schultz while traveling up the Swiftcurrent valley observed the glacier that now bears his name. Along with Schultz, Grinnell participated in the naming of many features in the Glacier region.

He was later influential in establishing Glacier National Park in 1910.

== Ethnology of the Plains cultures ==
Grinnell's books and publications reflect his lifelong learnings about the ways of northern American plains and the Plains tribes.

Along with J. A. Allen and William T. Hornaday, Grinnell was a historian of the buffalo and their relationship to Plains tribal culture. In When Buffalo Ran (1920), he describes hunting and working buffalo from a buffalo horse.

Grinnell's best-known works are on the Cheyenne, including The Fighting Cheyennes (1915), and a two-volume work, The Cheyenne Indians: Their History and Lifeways (1923). His principal translator (and also an informant) for both books was George Bent, a Cheyenne of mixed race who had fought for the Confederacy during the Civil War. George E. Hyde may have done much of the writing.

In 1928, Grinnell explored the story of brothers Major Frank North and Captain Luther H. North, who led Pawnee Scouts for the US Army. In other works on the Plains culture area, he focused on the Pawnee and Blackfeet people: Pawnee Hero Stories (1889), Blackfoot Lodge Tales (1892), and The Story of the Indian (1895).

Of his work, President Theodore Roosevelt said, "In his books… Mr. George Bird Grinnell has portrayed [the Indians] with a master hand; it is hard to see how his work can be bettered."

Selected papers by Grinnell were edited and published in 1972 by J. F. Reiger, a professor of history at Ohio University-Chillicothe and the former executive director of the Connecticut Audubon Society.

== Death and burial ==
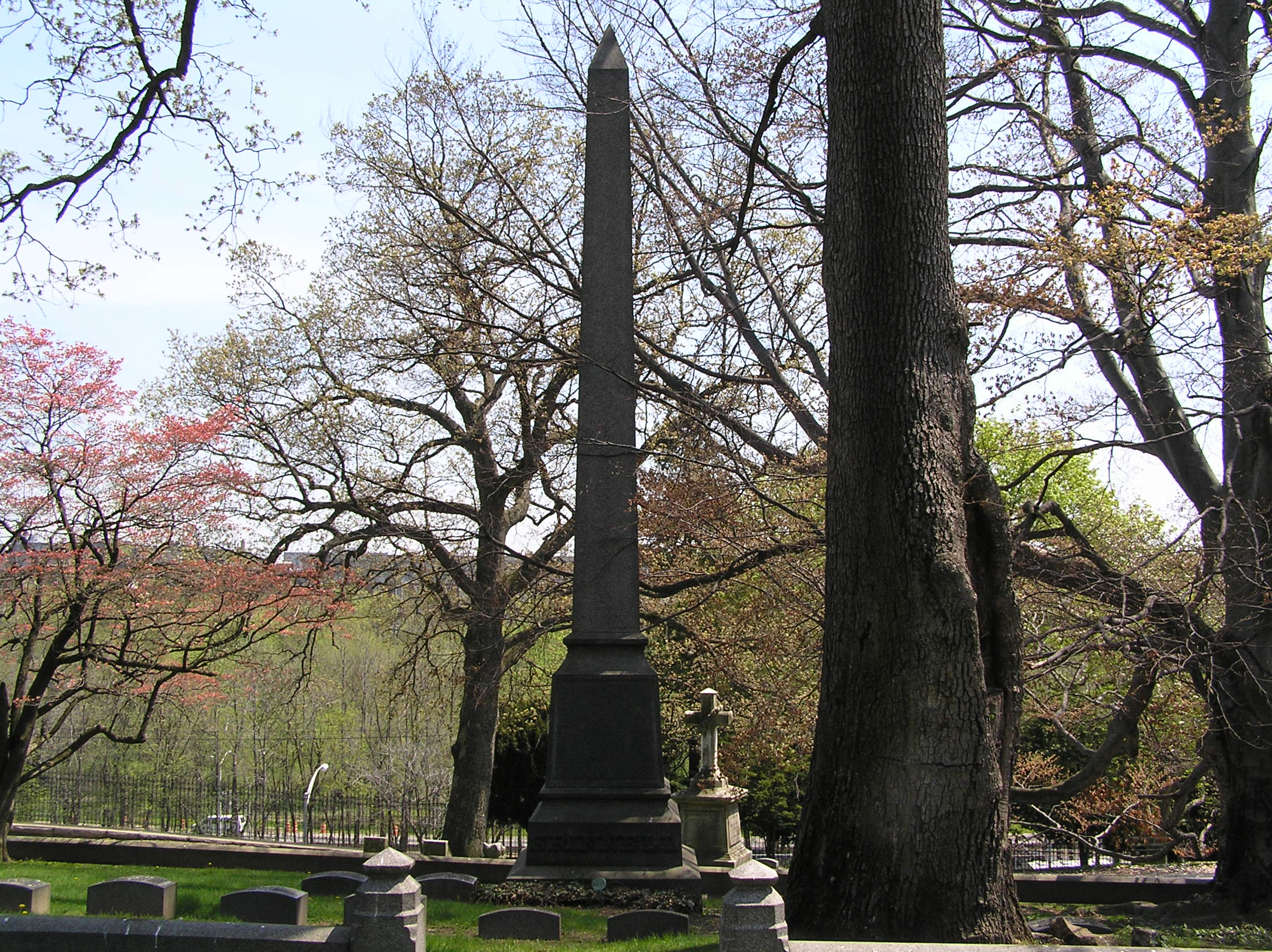
The tower of George Bird Grinnell's headstone in Woodlawn Cemetery

A news service took a photo of him and his wife, Elizabeth Curtis Williams Grinnell, on Grinnell Glacier in 1925.

He was still a traveler and explorer into his late seventies, but had a heart attack when he was 79 at home in New York in July 1929. Despite a poor prognosis he recovered, slowly.

Other illnesses kept him in the East in his final years, and Grinnell died April 11, 1938, aged 88, in New York City.

He was interred in Woodlawn Cemetery in the Bronx, New York City.

== Selected works ==
- Pawnee Hero Stories and Folk-Tales (1889) (Reprint: University of Nebraska Press, 1961)
- Blackfoot Lodge Tales (1892) (Reprint: BiblioBazaar, 2006) ISBN 978-1-4264-4744-0
- Hunting In Many Lands: The Book Of The Boone And Crockett Club (1895) (Reprint: Kessinger Publishing, 2007) ISBN 978-0-548-08525-7
- The Story of the Indian (1895)
- The Indians of Today (1900)
- American Duck Shooting (Classics of American Sport) (1901) (Reprint: Stackpole Books, 1991) ISBN 978-0-8117-2427-2
- The Punishment of the Stingy (1901)
- Alaska 1899: Essays from the Harriman Expedition (1902) (Reprint: University of Washington Press, 1995) ISBN 978-0-295-97377-7
- American Big Game in Its Haunts (1904) (Reprint: Dodo Press, 2007) ISBN 978-1-4065-4741-2
- American Game-Bird Shooting (1910)
- Trails of the Pathfinders (1911)
- Beyond the Old Frontier (1913)
- Blackfeet Indian Stories (1913) (Reprint: BiblioBazaar, 2007) ISBN 978-1-4346-0730-0
- The Fighting Cheyennes (1915) (Reprint: Kessinger Publishing, 2007) ISBN 978-0-548-13400-9
- When Buffalo Ran (1920, 2008) ISBN 978-1-4437-6845-0
- The Cheyenne Indians, Vol. 1: History and Society (1923) (Reprint: Bison Books, 1972) ISBN 978-0-8032-5771-9
- The Cheyenne Indians, Vol. 2: War, Ceremonies, and Religion (1923) (Reprint: Bison Books, 1972) ISBN 978-0-8032-5772-6
- By Cheyenne Campfires (1926) (Reprint: University of Nebraska Press, 1971) ISBN 978-0-8032-5746-7
- Two Great Scouts and Their Pawnee Battalion (1928) (Reprint: University of Nebraska Press, 1996) ISBN 978-0-8032-5775-7
- The Boy Scout's Book of True Adventure: Fourteen Honorary Scouts. New York: G. P. Putnam's Sons, 1931.
- Hunting on Three Continents, by George Bird Grinnell, Kermit Roosevelt, W. Redmond Cross, and Prentiss N. Gray (editors). New York: The Derrydale Press, 1933. -- The seventh book of the Boone and Crockett Club, this wide-ranging collection includes accounts of Expeditions toward the North Pole and to the south of the Equator, articles relating to wild animals, and other pieces that speak the perils of hunting game to the brink of extinction.
- The Last of the Buffalo (American Environmental Studies), (Ayer Co Pub, 1970) ISBN 978-0-405-02665-2
- The Passing of the Great West, (Winchester Press, 1972) ISBN 978-0-87691-065-8
- The Whistling Skeleton: American Indian Tales of the Supernatural, (Four Winds Press, 1982) ISBN 978-0-590-07801-6
- Native American Ways: Four Paths to Enlightenment, (A & D Publishing, 2007) ISBN 978-1-934451-93-9
