= Brule Creek =

Stream in South Dakota, U.S.

Coordinates: 42.802096°N 96.686034°W

Brule Creek is a stream in the U.S. state of South Dakota.

Brule Creek takes its name after the Brulé Indians.

== See also ==
- List of rivers of South Dakota
