= Broadwater, Nebraska =

- Village
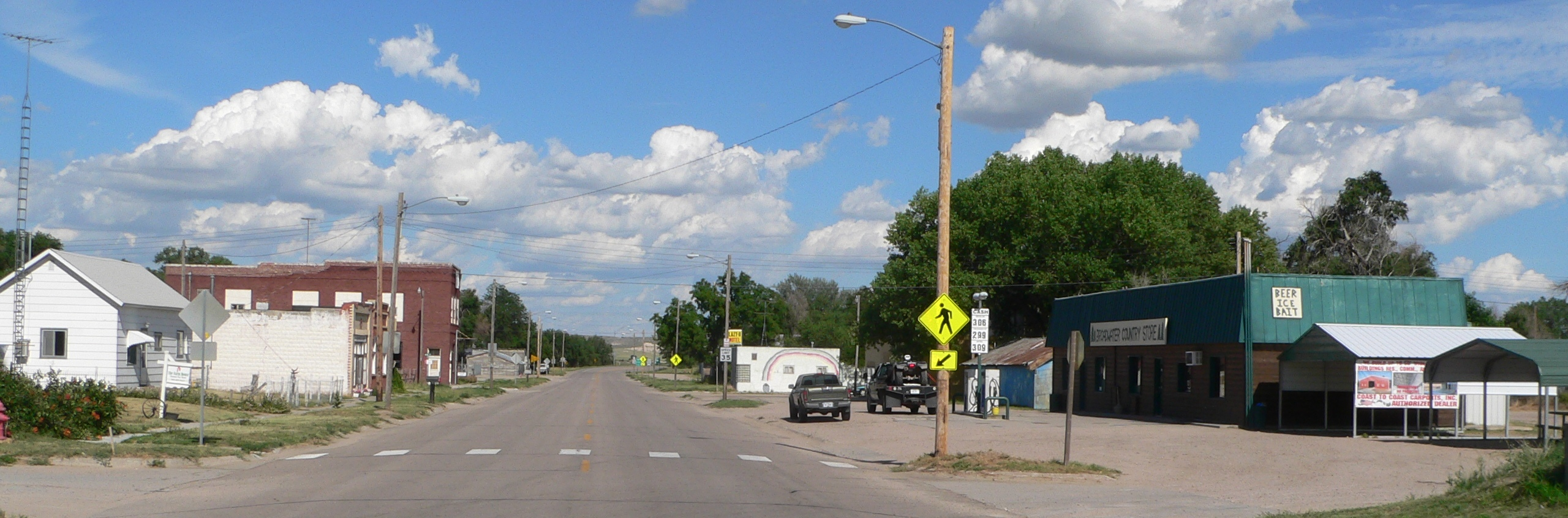
- Broadwater, looking east along U.S. Highway 26

- Location in Morrill County and the state of Nebraska
- Coordinates: 41°35′53″N 102°51′09″W
- Country: United States
- State: Nebraska
- County: Morrill

Area
  - Total: 0.16 sq mi (0.41 km^{2})
  - Land: 0.16 sq mi (0.41 km^{2})
  - Water: 0 sq mi (0.00 km^{2})
- Elevation: 3,586 ft (1,093 m)

Population (2020)
  - Total: 95
  - Density: 606.8/sq mi (234.27/km^{2})
- Time zone: UTC-7 (Mountain (MST))
  - Summer (DST): UTC-6 (MDT)
- ZIP code: 69125
- Area code: 308
- FIPS code: 31-06470
- GNIS feature ID: 2397461

Broadwater is a village in Morrill County, Nebraska, United States. The population was 95 as of the 2020 census, down from 128 in 2010.

== History ==
The Battle of Rush Creek between the U.S. army and warriors of the Cheyenne, Lakota Sioux, and Arapaho Indian tribes took place in 1865, 4 miles (6 km) southeast of present-day Broadwater, where Cedar Creek enters the North Platte River.

Broadwater got its start in 1909 when the railroad was extended to that point. It was named for one General Broadwater, the friend of a railroad official.

== Geography ==
Broadwater is in southeastern Morrill County, less than a mile north of the North Platte River. U.S. Route 26 passes through the village, leading northwest 15 miles (24 km) to Bridgeport, the county seat, and southeast 30 miles (48 km) to Oshkosh. Nebraska Highway 92 follows US 26 to the southeast from Broadwater but turns south at the village's eastern border and crosses the North Platte, running up the south side of the river valley 16 miles (26 km) to Bridgeport.

According to the U.S. Census Bureau, the village of Broadwater has a total area of 0.16 square miles (0.41 km^{2}), all land.

== Demographics ==
Historical population
| Census | Pop. | Note | %± |
|---|---|---|---|
| 1920 | 364 | | — |
| 1930 | 368 | | 1.1% |
| 1940 | 344 | | −6.5% |
| 1950 | 300 | | −12.8% |
| 1960 | 235 | | −21.7% |
| 1970 | 141 | | −40.0% |
| 1980 | 161 | | 14.2% |
| 1990 | 160 | | −0.6% |
| 2000 | 140 | | −12.5% |
| 2010 | 128 | | −8.6% |
| 2020 | 95 | | −25.8% |
U.S. Decennial Census

=== 2010 census ===
As of the census of 2010, there were 128 people, 60 households, and 35 families residing in the village. The population density was 800.0 inhabitants per square mile (308.9/km^{2}). There were 83 housing units at an average density of 518.8 per square mile (200.3/km^{2}). The racial makeup of the village was 96.1% White, 3.1% from other races, and 0.8% from two or more races. Hispanic or Latino of any race were 10.2% of the population.

There were 60 households, of which 16.7% had children under the age of 18 living with them, 41.7% were married couples living together, 8.3% had a female householder with no husband present, 8.3% had a male householder with no wife present, and 41.7% were non-families. 31.7% of all households were made up of individuals, and 16.7% had someone living alone who was 65 years of age or older. The average household size was 2.13 and the average family size was 2.63.

The median age in the village was 50.5 years. 15.6% of residents were under the age of 18; 9.4% were between the ages of 18 and 24; 17.2% were from 25 to 44; 30.4% were from 45 to 64; and 27.3% were 65 years of age or older. The gender makeup of the village was 49.2% male and 50.8% female.

=== 2000 census ===
As of the census of 2000, there were 140 people, 68 households, and 42 families residing in the village. The population density was 898.6 inhabitants per square mile (347.0/km^{2}). There were 81 housing units at an average density of 519.9 per square mile (200.7/km^{2}). The racial makeup of the village was 99.29% White, 0.71% from other races. Hispanic or Latino of any race were 1.43% of the population.

There were 68 households, out of which 23.5% had children under the age of 18 living with them, 51.5% were married couples living together, 5.9% had a female householder with no husband present, and 38.2% were non-families. 36.8% of all households were made up of individuals, and 13.2% had someone living alone who was 65 years of age or older. The average household size was 2.06 and the average family size was 2.69.

In the village, the population was spread out, with 21.4% under the age of 18, 3.6% from 18 to 24, 24.3% from 25 to 44, 25.7% from 45 to 64, and 25.0% who were 65 years of age or older. The median age was 48 years. For every 100 females, there were 94.4 males. For every 100 females age 18 and over, there were 107.5 males.

As of 2000 the median income for a household in the village was $25,156, and the median income for a family was $26,563. Males had a median income of $27,500 versus $19,375 for females. The per capita income for the village was $14,568. There were 4.0% of families and 12.6% of the population living below the poverty line, including 20.6% of under eighteens and 20.0% of those over 64.
