= George E. Hyde =

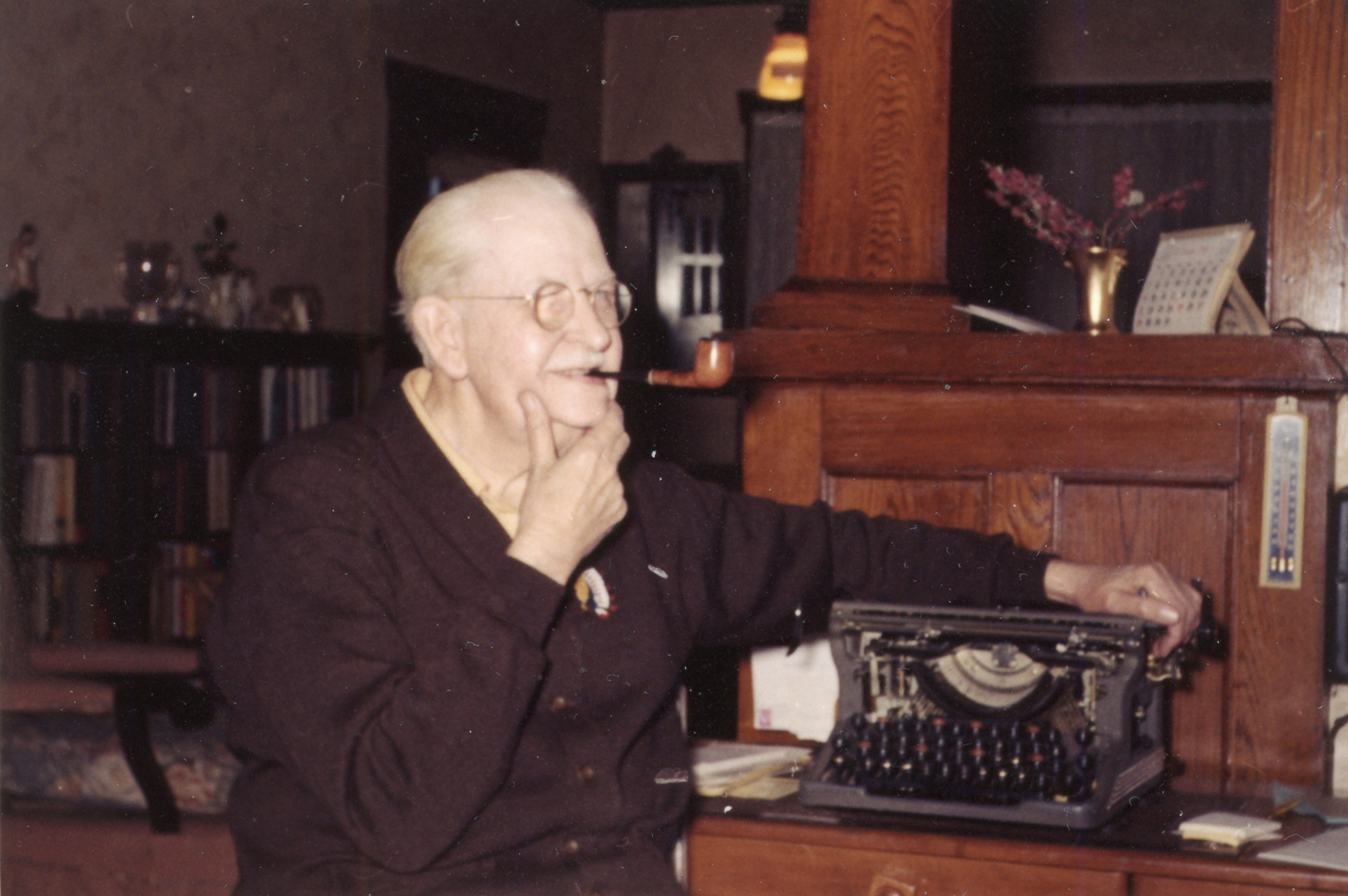
- Hyde in 1959
- Born: 10 June 1882; Omaha, Nebraska, United States
- Died: 2 February 1968; Omaha, Nebraska, United States
- Occupations: historian, ethnologist, author
- Writing career
- Genre: Native American studies

George Elmer Hyde (1882–1968) was the "Dean of American Indian Historians." He wrote many books about Indian tribes, especially the Sioux and Pawnee, plus a life of the Cheyenne warrior and historian, George Bent.

== Life ==
Hyde was born in Omaha, Nebraska and lived there all his life. He was educated only to the eighth grade. His interest in American Indians was excited by a visit to an Indian encampment at the Trans-Mississippi Exposition in Omaha in 1898. At eighteen he became totally deaf and nearly blind as a result of rheumatic fever. Despite his modest means, this did not discourage him from pursuing his Indian studies. In fact, he went a step further and even owned a bookstore to support himself. He led a reclusive life, and as he grew older, he relied on a powerful magnifying glass to aid his reading. Hyde communicated with the world almost entirely through his letters and books.

Hyde began a correspondence with George Bent in 1904 and, at Bent's recommendation, became a salaried researcher for George Bird Grinnell about 1908. Hyde, with extensive contributions from Bent, claimed to be the ghost writer for Grinnell's classic book The Fighting Cheyennes. Grinnell and Hyde are both distinguished for emphasizing the importance of Indians in the history of the Western frontier.

== Works ==
Hyde was a polemic writer whose works were regarded for their cynical outlook. As an outsider in the anthropological fraternity, he had difficulty getting his works published. This was especially true of his Life of George Bent, based on the 340 letters he received from Bent between 1904 and 1918. Life of George Bent had to wait for 50 years before being published, but is widely viewed as among the most comprehensive first-person accounts published from the Indian point of view about the Cheyenne wars with the United States in the 1860s. Collaborators Hyde and Bent never met in person.

- Red Cloud's Folk: A History of the Oglala Sioux Indians (1937, revised 1957)
- The Pawnee Indians (1951)
- A Sioux Chronicle (1956)
- Indians of the High Plains: From the Prehistoric Period to the Coming of the Europeans (1959)
- Spotted Tail's Folk: A History of the Brule Sioux Indians (1961)
- Indians of the Woodlands: From Prehistoric Times to 1725 (1962)
- Life of George Bent: Written from his Letters (1967)
