= Dalton, Nebraska =

- Village
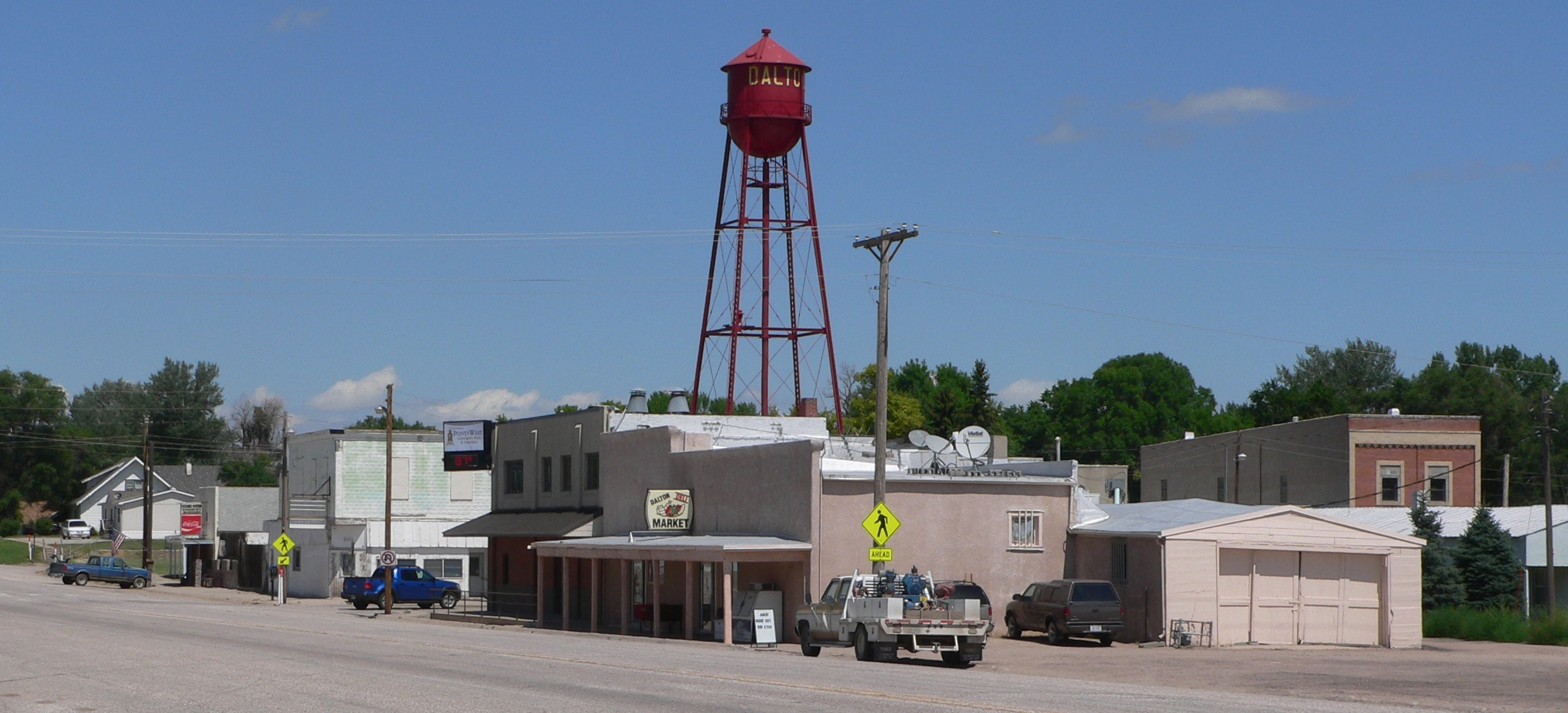
- Dalton, looking northeast across U.S. Route 385

- Location of Dalton, Nebraska
- Coordinates: 41°24′30″N 102°58′15″W
- Country: United States
- State: Nebraska
- County: Cheyenne

Area
  - Total: 0.34 sq mi (0.89 km^{2})
  - Land: 0.34 sq mi (0.89 km^{2})
  - Water: 0 sq mi (0.00 km^{2})
- Elevation: 4,259 ft (1,298 m)

Population (2020)
  - Total: 284
  - Density: 826/sq mi (318.8/km^{2})
- Time zone: UTC-7 (Mountain (MST))
  - Summer (DST): UTC-6 (MDT)
- ZIP code: 69131
- Area code: 308
- FIPS code: 31-12070
- GNIS feature ID: 2398672
- Website: www.daltonnebraska.com

Dalton is a village in Cheyenne County, Nebraska, United States. As of the 2020 census, Dalton had a population of 284.

== History ==
=== Early history ===
Dalton was founded circa 1900 when the Nebraska, Wyoming and Western Railroad was extended to that point. The railroad was certified in 1899 and railroad crews began surveying potential routes in Cheyenne County. In January 1900, the railroad purchased 150 acres of land from the Union Pacific Railroad, which had received the land in a land grant in 1867. The newly purchased land became a transportation hub for the Nebraska, Wyoming and Western Railroad, and the small town of Dalton that developed on the land became one of the work stations for the railroad. By September 1900, the railroad offered daily freight and passenger transportation north to Deadwood, South Dakota and south to Denver, Colorado from Dalton.

=== Post Office ===
The Dalton post office was established June 7, 1902 and Warren Woolsey was named the first postmaster.

=== Newspaper ===
The Dalton Herald was the first newspaper that was published in Dalton. It began publication in 1909 but did not remain in publication for long, although it remains unknown when exactly it went out of publication. The Dalton Delegate replaced the Herald in 1914 and was published every Friday until it went out of publication in September 1951.

=== Name Origins ===
The true origin of Dalton's name remains a mystery. Some sources claim that Dalton was likely named after the town of Dalton, Massachusetts. Other sources maintain that Dalton was named after either Patrick Dalton, an early settler, or Patrick J. Dalton, an official of the Burlington Railroad.

== Geography ==
According to the United States Census Bureau, the village has a total area of 0.34 square miles (0.88 km^{2}), all land.

=== Climate ===
Climate data for Dalton, Nebraska (1991–2020 normals, extremes 1961–2018)
| Month | Jan | Feb | Mar | Apr | May | Jun | Jul | Aug | Sep | Oct | Nov | Dec | Year |
|---|---|---|---|---|---|---|---|---|---|---|---|---|---|
| Record high °F (°C) | 73 (23) | 78 (26) | 82 (28) | 89 (32) | 96 (36) | 102 (39) | 104 (40) | 102 (39) | 98 (37) | 91 (33) | 78 (26) | 78 (26) | 104 (40) |
| Mean maximum °F (°C) | 60.7 (15.9) | 63.1 (17.3) | 73.9 (23.3) | 81.3 (27.4) | 87.8 (31.0) | 93.6 (34.2) | 98.0 (36.7) | 95.4 (35.2) | 91.2 (32.9) | 81.0 (27.2) | 71.4 (21.9) | 61.1 (16.2) | 98.4 (36.9) |
| Mean daily maximum °F (°C) | 39.4 (4.1) | 41.3 (5.2) | 51.3 (10.7) | 59.3 (15.2) | 68.6 (20.3) | 80.5 (26.9) | 87.0 (30.6) | 84.9 (29.4) | 75.8 (24.3) | 61.3 (16.3) | 48.9 (9.4) | 39.6 (4.2) | 61.5 (16.4) |
| Daily mean °F (°C) | 29.5 (−1.4) | 30.7 (−0.7) | 39.9 (4.4) | 47.5 (8.6) | 57.3 (14.1) | 67.9 (19.9) | 74.3 (23.5) | 72.3 (22.4) | 63.1 (17.3) | 49.6 (9.8) | 38.2 (3.4) | 30.0 (−1.1) | 50.0 (10.0) |
| Mean daily minimum °F (°C) | 19.6 (−6.9) | 20.1 (−6.6) | 28.5 (−1.9) | 35.6 (2.0) | 46.1 (7.8) | 55.4 (13.0) | 61.6 (16.4) | 59.6 (15.3) | 50.5 (10.3) | 37.9 (3.3) | 27.5 (−2.5) | 20.4 (−6.4) | 38.6 (3.7) |
| Mean minimum °F (°C) | −2.9 (−19.4) | −3.6 (−19.8) | 6.1 (−14.4) | 17.7 (−7.9) | 29.2 (−1.6) | 40.5 (4.7) | 49.4 (9.7) | 46.9 (8.3) | 32.3 (0.2) | 18.4 (−7.6) | 6.3 (−14.3) | −4.3 (−20.2) | −13.5 (−25.3) |
| Record low °F (°C) | −31 (−35) | −26 (−32) | −16 (−27) | −7 (−22) | 18 (−8) | 30 (−1) | 41 (5) | 35 (2) | 15 (−9) | −2 (−19) | −8 (−22) | −32 (−36) | −32 (−36) |
| Average precipitation inches (mm) | 0.46 (12) | 0.64 (16) | 1.14 (29) | 2.27 (58) | 3.47 (88) | 2.97 (75) | 2.91 (74) | 1.97 (50) | 1.85 (47) | 1.59 (40) | 0.69 (18) | 0.57 (14) | 20.53 (521) |
| Average snowfall inches (cm) | 7.3 (19) | 8.8 (22) | 6.1 (15) | 6.4 (16) | 1.6 (4.1) | 0.0 (0.0) | 0.0 (0.0) | 0.0 (0.0) | 0.2 (0.51) | 3.1 (7.9) | 5.6 (14) | 9.0 (23) | 48.1 (122) |
| Average precipitation days (≥ 0.01 in) | 3.8 | 4.9 | 5.6 | 8.0 | 9.7 | 9.9 | 7.9 | 7.5 | 6.0 | 5.9 | 3.5 | 3.6 | 76.3 |
| Average snowy days (≥ 0.1 in) | 2.3 | 3.1 | 2.3 | 1.3 | 0.4 | 0.0 | 0.0 | 0.0 | 0.1 | 0.9 | 1.9 | 2.4 | 14.7 |
Source: NOAA (mean maxima/minima 1981–2010)

== Demographics ==
Historical population
| Census | Pop. | Note | %± |
|---|---|---|---|
| 1910 | 207 | | — |
| 1920 | 295 | | 42.5% |
| 1930 | 453 | | 53.6% |
| 1940 | 358 | | −21.0% |
| 1950 | 417 | | 16.5% |
| 1960 | 503 | | 20.6% |
| 1970 | 354 | | −29.6% |
| 1980 | 345 | | −2.5% |
| 1990 | 282 | | −18.3% |
| 2000 | 332 | | 17.7% |
| 2010 | 315 | | −5.1% |
| 2020 | 284 | | −9.8% |
U.S. Decennial Census

=== 2010 census ===
As of the census of 2010, there were 315 people, 142 households, and 81 families living in the village. The population density was 926.5 inhabitants per square mile (357.7/km^{2}). There were 170 housing units at an average density of 500.0 per square mile (193.1/km^{2}). The racial makeup of the village was 98.4% White, 0.3% Native American, 0.6% from other races, and 0.6% from two or more races. Hispanic or Latino of any race were 2.9% of the population.

There were 142 households, of which 26.8% had children under the age of 18 living with them, 45.8% were married couples living together, 9.2% had a female householder with no husband present, 2.1% had a male householder with no wife present, and 43.0% were non-families. 38.0% of all households were made up of individuals, and 17.7% had someone living alone who was 65 years of age or older. The average household size was 2.22 and the average family size was 2.93.

The median age in the village was 41.1 years. 24.8% of residents were under the age of 18; 6% were between the ages of 18 and 24; 22.5% were from 25 to 44; 27.6% were from 45 to 64; and 19% were 65 years of age or older. The gender makeup of the village was 50.2% male and 49.8% female.

=== 2000 census ===
As of the census of 2000, there were 332 people, 156 households, and 83 families living in the village. The population density was 966.2 inhabitants per square mile (373.1/km^{2}). There were 170 housing units at an average density of 494.7 per square mile (191.0/km^{2}). The racial makeup of the village was 99.40% White, 0.30% Native American, and 0.30% from two or more races.

There were 156 households, out of which 26.3% had children under the age of 18 living with them, 46.8% were married couples living together, 5.1% had a female householder with no husband present, and 46.2% were non-families. 42.3% of all households were made up of individuals, and 23.7% had someone living alone who was 65 years of age or older. The average household size was 2.13 and the average family size was 2.95.

In the village, the population was spread out, with 24.1% under the age of 18, 6.0% from 18 to 24, 24.4% from 25 to 44, 23.5% from 45 to 64, and 22.0% who were 65 years of age or older. The median age was 41 years. For every 100 females, there were 86.5 males. For every 100 females age 18 and over, there were 80.0 males.

As of 2000 the median income for a household in the village was $28,967, and the median income for a family was $43,250. Males had a median income of $27,500 versus $18,750 for females. The per capita income for the village was $18,600. About 10.3% of families and 10.7% of the population were below the poverty line, including 10.4% of those under age 18 and 25.3% of those age 65 or over.

== Schools ==
Dalton is home to Leyton High School, Leyton Public Schools

The communities of Dalton and Gurley combined school districts in 1978 to form Leyton Public Schools.
