= John Wesley Prowers =

American rancher, legislator, and businessman (1838–1884)

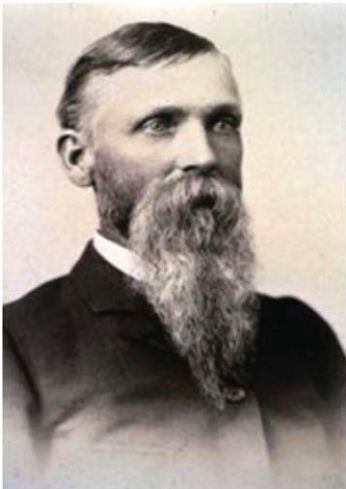
- Born: January 29, 1838 near Westport, Missouri
- Died: February 14, 1884 (aged 46); Kansas City, Missouri
- Occupations: Trader, cattle-rancher, businessman, legislator
- Spouse: Amache Prowers
- Relatives: Cheyenne Peace Chief Ochinee (father-in-law)

John Wesley Prowers (January 29, 1838 – February 14, 1884) was an American trader, cattle rancher, legislator, and businessman in the territory and state of Colorado. Married to Amache Prowers, a Cheyenne woman, his father-in-law was a Cheyenne chief who negotiated for peace and was killed during the Sand Creek massacre.

He began his career as a trader when he was eighteen years of age. After several years, he began buying cattle, the first man to drive cattle westward to Colorado. He was among the first white men to settle in southeastern Colorado. Known as the cattle baron of the Arkansas (River Valley), he was the first known person to introduce Hereford cattle to Colorado and the first cattle rancher in the area. He raised horses and sheep and operated a farm, which supplied Fort Lyon.

The Prowers House operated as a stagecoach station, general store, school, county office, and hotel. After the railroads came to the area, he moved to Las Animas and established a store, helped found a bank, and, with Charles Goodnight, co-founded a meat packing plant.

== Early life ==
Prowers was born on January 29, 1838, near Westport, Missouri. (Note: His birth year is also (but rarely) stated as 1839.) As a young boy, he acquired a stepfather when his mother married John Vogil, who was hard on his stepson. Prowers spent just 13 months in the public schools.

== Career ==
=== Early career ===
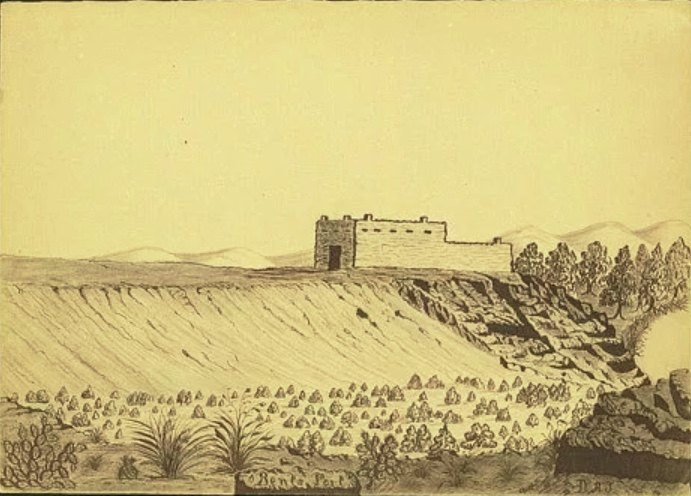
A sketch of Bent's New Fort made in 1859 by Daniel Jenks who traveled to Colorado Territory in search of gold. Photo courtesy Library of Congress, Prints and Photographs Department.

When he was eighteen years of age, he was hired by Robert Miller who was an agent for Cheyenne, Arapaho, Kiowas, Comanche, and Apache tribes of the upper Arkansas area. They traveled from Westport, Missouri to Bent's Fort in what is now Colorado. Their wagon contained annuity goods—sugar, oatmeal, bacon, salt, beans, coffee, cornmeal, and other goods—which Miller and Prowers passed out to Native Americans who came to the fort. (Note: William Bent it said to have led of the wagon train.) Bent's Fort was a trading post where Native Americans traded buffalo robes and mountain men traded beaver skins for goods. Their customers included French-Canadians and Mexicans. He worked at Bent's Fort for seven years, from 1856 to 1863, as a trader who led wagon trains to and from Missouri, returning with supplies for Bent's Fort. From 1865 to 1871, he delivered government supplies from Leavenworth, Kansas, to Fort Union. He also delivered supplies to Fort Laramie. He learned the Cheyenne language and was sometimes called upon to act as an interpreter. Respected by Native Americans and whites, he often provided background information about the lifestyle and issues of the indigenous people of Colorado to help whites understand their perspectives.

=== Relationship with native Americans ===
When Prowers began to settle in what is now southeastern Colorado, there were very few white settlers and they were isolated from one another. Albert G. Boone, the grandson of Daniel Boone and an Indian agent for the Cheyenne and Arapaho, lived 80 miles (130 km) west of Fort Lyon and helped negotiate the Treaty of Fort Wise (later renamed Fort Lyon) in 1861. William Bent's Bent's Old Fort, established in 1833, was a stagecoach station, trading post, and a meeting place for people of Mexican, Native American, and European-American descent. Robison Malory Moore, husband of William Bent's daughter, Mary, settled at the mouth of the Purgatoire River in 1860.

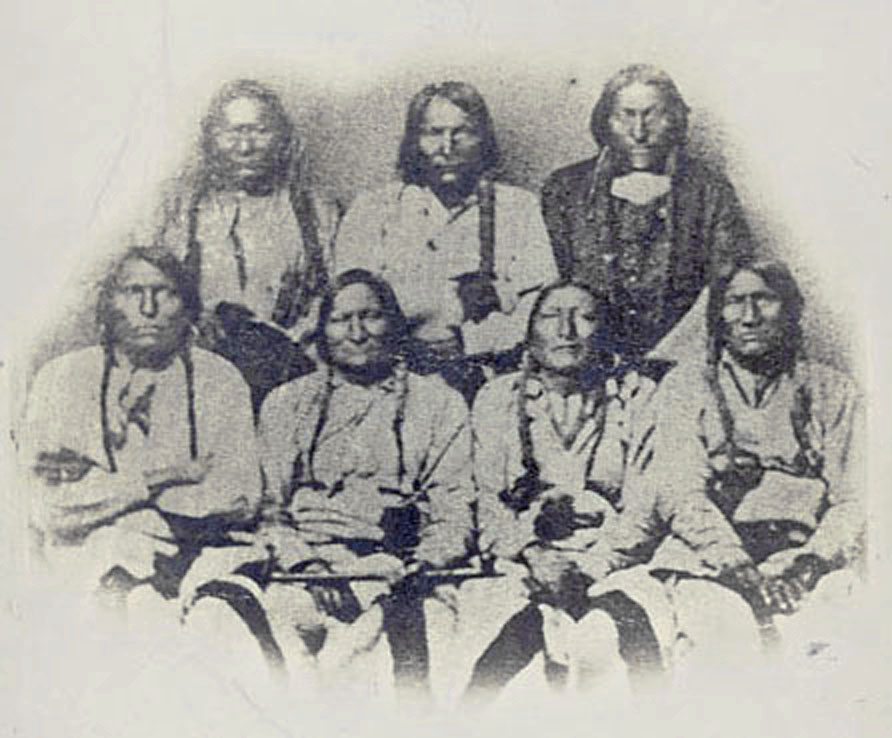
Delegation Of Cheyenne and Arapaho Chiefs at Camp Weld on September 28, 1864

Over time, as more white people moved into what is now Colorado, relations between the Plains Indians and the whites became increasingly hostile. Cheyenne and Arapaho leaders did not understand the cultural ways and perspectives of the whites. In 1864, Chief Black Kettle and Chief Ochinee (One-Eye) met with Governor John Evans and Colonel John Chivington. Although they did not have a formal treaty, they believed that they had an agreement for peace and complied with their requirements for peace, including arriving at Fort Lyon to enter into discussion with Major Wynkoop, who was replaced by the time they arrived by Major Anthony. Anthony supported their goal for peace and the Cheyenne leaders explained that the young men were planning on leaving on a buffalo hunt. The Cheyenne were told that they would be safe if they stayed at their Sand Creek encampment. Soldiers from the fort arrived at the Prowers home and held the family and ranch hands hostages for 2 and a half days before the Sand Creek massacre on November 29, 1864, in which Chief Ochinee and 160 people from the village, mostly women and children, died.

=== Rancher and farmer ===
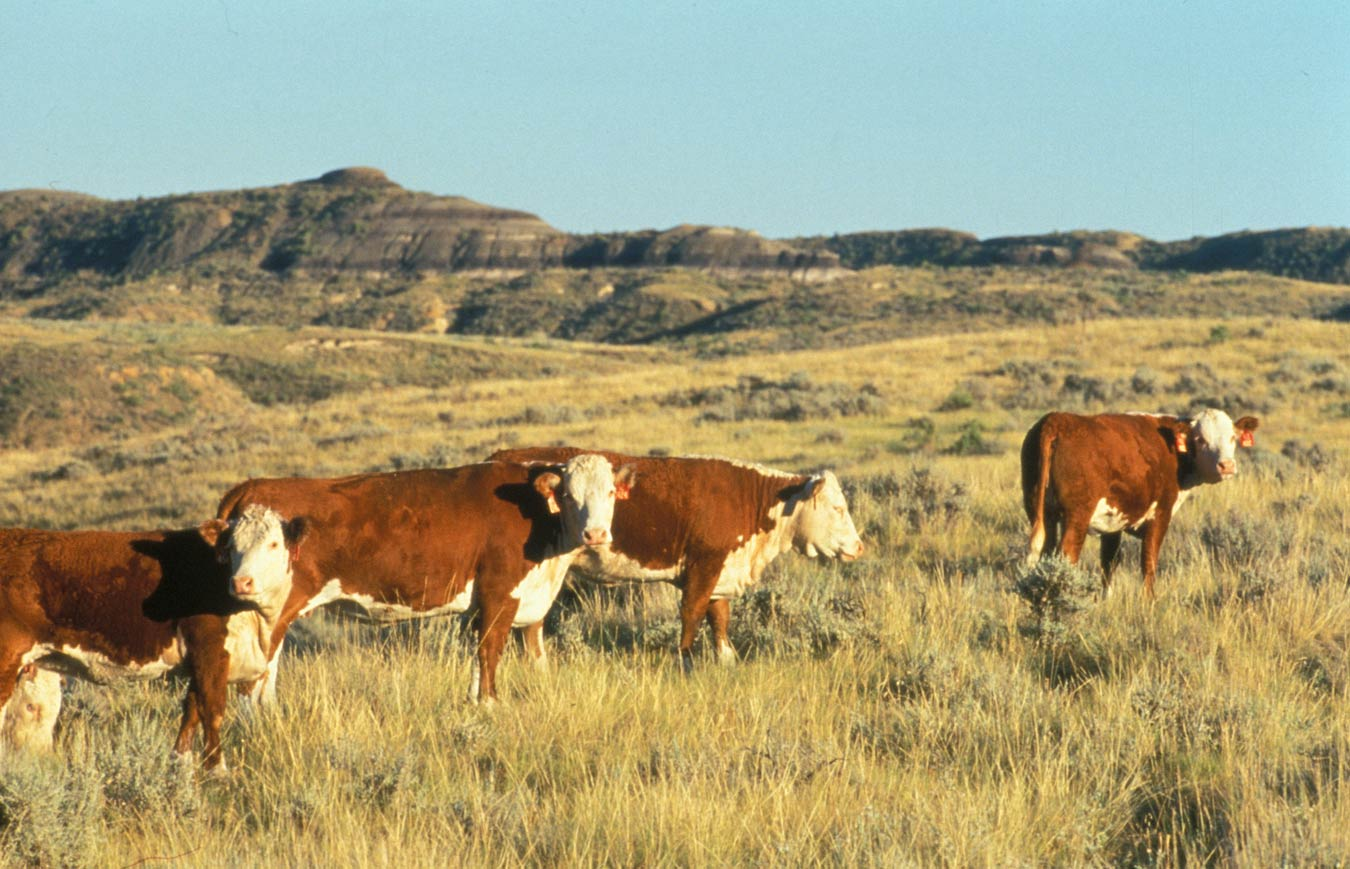
Hereford cattle

The first man to drive cattle to the west, Prowers began purchasing cattle in 1861, first shorthorn cattle and then Hereford cattle, who better survived the Colorado winters. He drove them to Colorado during his wagon train trips. (Note: He settled on the Hereford cattle after experimenting with Kurry cattle from England and Black Angus cattle from Scotland.) He was considered the first and largest rancher in the area. In 1863, he increased his land holdings when he bought land across from Fort Lyons. Prowers' wife Amache, their two oldest daughters, and Amache's mother each received reparations by the United States government in the form of 640 acres (260 ha) of land along the Arkansas River. Amache used her land to expand her family's cattle ranch. (Note: Although land owned by American women went to their husbands if they were married, the treaty that Amache and her female family members were subject to meant that they owned the land gained through reparations.) He purchased some of his land for his cattle ranching from the half-Native American children who received war reparations following the Sand Creek massacre (1864) and from local whites.

The Prowers also raised sheep and horses and operated a farm. Fort Lyon bought nearly all the produce that the farm produced. Tarbox Ditch, a seven-mile irrigation ditch that served 1,000 acres (400 ha), was utilized by the Prowers farm, as well as the Boggs and Robert Bent farms. Due to the irrigation, the three farms grew potatoes, corn, wheat, alfalfa, and vegetables. He contracted with the United States government to provide large quantities of hay.

The Atchison, Topeka and Santa Fe Railway (AT&SF) came to Colorado in 1873 and its tracks ran along a border of the Prowers ranch. A train station was established at Granada. Cattle was then shipped via train, rather than having to be driven to stockyards. By 1876, Prowers, known as the cattle baron of the Arkansas (Arkansas River Valley), and Charles Goodnight established a meatpacking plant in Las Animas. The Prowers had 15,000 head of cattle and had acquired more land so that they had 30 miles (48 km) of waterfront alongside the Arkansas River by 1881. (Note: They are said to have amassed up to 50,000 cattle and were major landowners in the Big Timbers area of Colorado, which was the hunting and winter campground for Native American tribes.) (Note: In the winters of 1885–1886 and 1886–1887, "intense blizzards" resulted in a tremendous loss of cattle in Colorado, nearly wiping out the cattle industry. By that time, John Wesley Prowers had died and his wife and son ran the cattle ranch.) They had 70,000 head of cattle at one fall roundup.

=== Businessman ===
After living first at Bent's Fort, John and his wife operated a stagecoach station at their home in Caddoa. During the winter, they boarded mules and horses for Fort Lyon and in the summer grew vegetables for the military. They also sold horses and livestock to the fort. In the spring of 1867, a flood of the Arkansas River nearly destroyed the fort. It was moved 20 miles west and the Prowers moved to be closer to the new location.

In 1867, the Prowers family established a two-story, 14-room house in Boggsville. The U-shaped building was the site of a stagecoach station, school, and general store. They raised cattle there. After 1870, Bent County's county office was located in the Prowers house, which served as Boggsville's town center. About that time, a school was established near the Prowers house. Established in 1869 with 21 students, it was the first public school in southeastern Colorado. Kit Carson was a neighbor there.

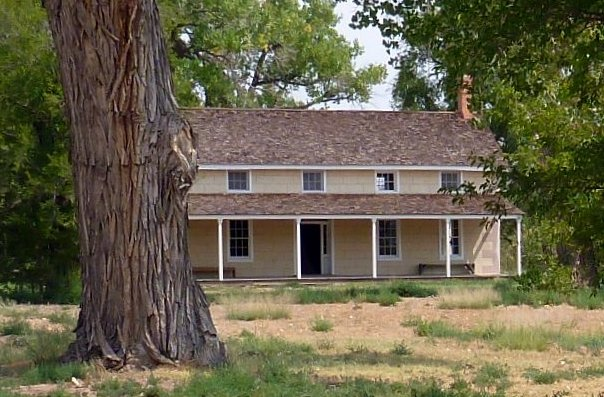
Prowers House in Boggsville, Colorado

Located on the Purgatoire branch of the Santa Fe Trail, the stagecoach station provided meals for travelers, while the stagecoach horses were traded for fresh horses. Officers at For Lyon were guests at the Prowers House. Parties and dances were held in Boggsville, which drew settlers and cowboys from a 50-mile radius (80 km).

After the Atchison Topeka & Santa Fe Railway and the Kansas Pacific Railway established rail service into southeastern Colorado in 1873, The Prowers moved to the new town of Las Animas, in 1873 or 1874, where they lived and operated a large general store. John helped found the Bent County Bank and established the commission house of Prowers & Hough, which received goods delivered to him in Las Animas and he had delivered to merchants in southeastern Colorado, New Mexico, and Arizona—until railroad service extended deeper into Colorado.

=== Politician ===
Bent County became a county within Colorado in February 1870 and Las Animas was the county seat. Prowers was elected the first county commissioner and Boggsville was made the county seat in November. A Democrat, Prowers served in the territorial legislature in 1873 and the state legislature in 1880; Colorado became a state in 1876. He was defeated when he ran for lieutenant governor, with Hon. J.B. Grant on the ticket for governor.

== Personal life ==
Prowers met a Cheyenne girl, Amache Ochinee, the daughter of a Cheyenne sub-chief Ochinee and later gained acceptance from her father to marry her. The 15 year-old Amache and Prowers were married in the Indian Territory near Camp Supply in 1861. They started their married life at Bent's Fort in the commissary building.

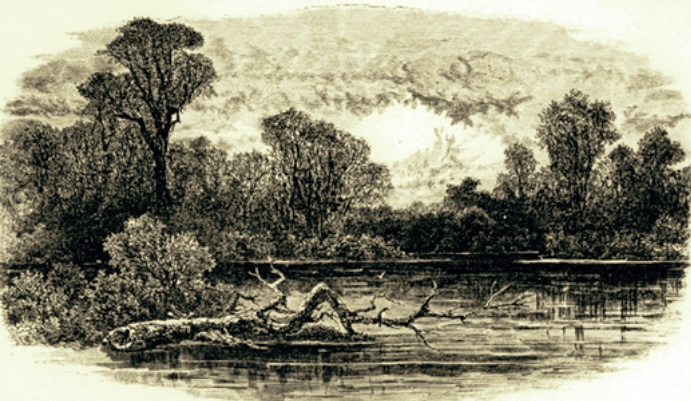
Big Timbers along the Arkansas River. An illustration from Richard Irving Dodge (1883). Our Wild Indians; Thirty-three Years' Personal Experience Among the Red Men of the Great West

During his winter 1862 trip to Missouri, Prowers left Amache with his aunt in Westport and their first child, Mary, was born there on July 18, 1863. Prowers picked up his family a few months later for the two-month return trip to Colorado. They settled with their baby daughter at a cattle ranch with three stone buildings that Prowers established on Caddoa Creek in the area of Big Timbers. (Note: The three buildings were erected when the Caddo tribe was relocated from Texas, but decided not to move there.) Mary married A.D. Hudnall and had three children. Their second child, Katherine, married W.A. Haws and had two children. Inez married Glen O. Comstock and had two children. The only surviving son, John Wesley, Jr. was followed by George, who died at age eleven. Leona, the wife of T.H. Marshall, died at 20 years of age. Ida married Louis F. Horton. Amy had not married by 1899. The children were educated in Colorado at Rice Institute in Trinidad, at local schools, and Wolfe Hall in Denver, and then sent to Lexington and Independence, Missouri, to for higher level schooling or college. For instance, John Wesley, Jr. went to Lexington, where he was educated at Wentworth Military Academy between 1883 and 1888, from ages 13 to 18.

When the family lived in Boggsville, Native American tribes camped nearby as they visited their relatives, like Amache, who were married to white men. He is welcoming, accommodating and generous with Amache's Cheyenne family members, who honored and respected him. Settlers stayed at Boggsville in September 1868 when renegade Cheyenne warriors stole and killed livestock and killed one person. (Note: This was at a time when Native Americans had made treaties that they would not range across their old hunting ground and campsites in exchange for food upon which they would need to survive. But, Native Americans began to starve because they did not receive enough food to survive.) The Cheyenne were keenly aware that the construction of railway lines in Colorado meant an end to their way of life. Prowers averted an attack by the Cheyenne on Las Animas, where there was a railway station.

In 1880, with an intention to increase the wildlife in the area, Prowers shipped in white-tail deer—three does and two bucks—and turned them loose near his ranch. As of 1945, white-tailed deer were found in New Mexico, near Trinidad on Fishers Peak, and near where they were originally released along the Arkansas River. An earlier attempt by Prowers to introduce eight dozen prairie chickens was not successful, but his friends Luke Cahill and Judge M. Robinson were successful at introducing bobwhite quail in the area.

== Death and legacy ==
In late 1883 or 1884, Prowers was seriously ill and went to Kansas City, Missouri, for medical treatment. He died there at the home of his sister Mrs. John Simpson Hough on February 14, 1884, leaving an estate of $750,000 (equivalent to $26,875,000 in 2025). He was buried at Las Animas cemetery, as was Amache, who died in Boston. Prowers County, Colorado, was named after him.

The Prowers house became a property on the Boggsville Historic Site in 1985, and it was listed on the National Register of Historic Places the following year. It is a certified site of the Santa Fe Trail.
