= Amache Prowers =

Native American activist, advocate and cattle rancher

Amache Ochinee Prowers
- Áméóhtsé'e
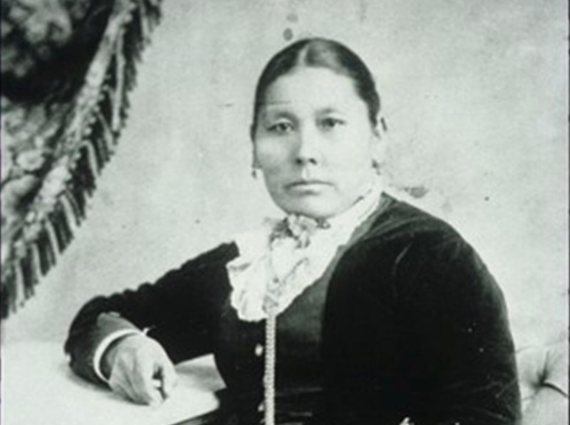
- Amache Prowers, Cheyenne mediator, wife of John Wesley Prowers, late 19th century
- Born: Amache Ochinee (Walking Woman) (Note: Her nickname was Amy.) c. 1846; Southeastern Colorado plains
- Died: 1905; Cambridge, Massachusetts
- Citizenship: Native American
- Occupations: Mediator, cattle-rancher, business woman
- Spouse: John Wesley Prowers
- Father: Cheyenne Peace Chief Ochinee

Amache Ochinee Prowers, also known as Walking Woman (Cheyenne: Áméóhtsé'e; c. 1846–1905), was a Native American activist, advocate, cattle rancher, and operator of a store on the Santa Fe Trail. Her father was a Cheyenne peace chief who was killed during the Sand Creek massacre on November 29, 1864, after which she became a mediator between Colorado territorial settlers, Mexicans, and Native Americans during the 1860s and 1870s. She was inducted into the Colorado Women's Hall of Fame in 2018.

== Personal life ==
=== Early life ===
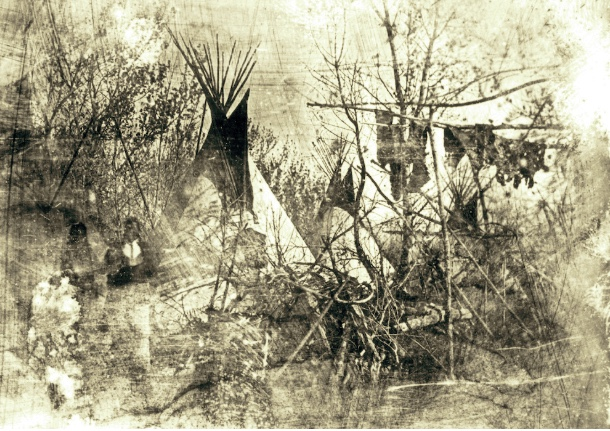
The only surviving daguerreotype from Solomon Nunes Carvalho's journey West in 1853 depicts a view of the Cheyenne village at Big Timbers. A pair of figures stand to the left; drying hides hang on the right. Courtesy of Library of Congress.

Amache, a full-blooded member of the Southern Cheyenne tribe, was born possibly in the summer of 1846 during a forced march of her tribe across the plains of Southeastern Colorado. Her father Ochinee (Nah-ku-uk-ihu-us) (Note: He was also known as Chief One Eye, which he acquired after being injured in a game of sling-shot.) was a Cheyenne Peace Chief who often camped near Bent's Fort (Big Timbers) with other Cheyenne. In 1846, the Cheyenne of the Arkansas River Valley were subject to significant change as they saw whites arrive in significant numbers. General Stephen W. Kearny led United States soldiers through Colorado during the Mexican–American War. In late July, when the Cheyenne were encamped at Bent's Fort, 1,700 soldiers were encamped for miles along the Arkansas River. The Cheyenne had noticed an increase in the number of white people that traveled with wagons on the Santa Fe Trail to trade with the New Mexicans. Also in 1846, Thomas Fitzpatrick was assigned as the first Indian resident agent at Bent's Fort.

As a child in a Cheyenne tribe, Prowers would have had a lot of freedom, until she had her first menstrual cycle, when she would have learned how to clean, tan hides, cook, and take on other responsibilities of Cheyenne women.

=== Marriage and children ===
John Wesley Prowers was a trader who visited (Note: John Wesley Prowers was from Missouri and Prowers County, Colorado was named after him.) and then employed by William Bent at Bent's Fort. He saw Amache perform a Cheyenne dance around 1860. Later, he asked Chief Ochinee if he could marry Amache the following year. They were engaged in a typical Cheyenne courtship, which involved exchanging gifts. (Note: It was common for traders to marry Native American women along the Santa Fe Trail.)

In 1861, at the age of 15 or 16, she married 25-year-old John Wesley Prowers, a cattleman and trader. After their marriage, they spent a few months in Westport, Missouri, where she learned the traditions of white women. She experienced prejudice, being called "that Indian woman" by John's brother-in-law, John Hough. Then they lived at Bent's Fort.

John and Amache worked together in their business and personal pursuits and settled along the Santa Fe Trail in Boggsville, Colorado in 1867. They lived in a 14-room adobe house, which is a Boggsville Historic Site in Bent County, where they raised nine children who were familiar with the cultures of people of European and Native American heritage. (Note: The daughter who wrote the story about her parents and the Prowers Ranch stated that it had 14 rooms. The article written by the Colorado Women's Hall of Fame said the house had 24 rooms.) The children were Mary, Susan (who died as an infant), Kathrine, Inez, John, Frank, Leona, Ida, and Mary. Prowers was adept at integrating her o culture with Mexican and Euro-American cultures. She adopted the dress of white women at the time, but would not adopt the corset. Although she always spoke English at home, she taught her children words of the Cheyenne language. She maintained Cheyenne traditions among her family, like preparing food from her culture such as pickled prickly pears and rolls of thinly sliced sweetened and spiced buffalo meat for special occasions. She prepared food with spring greens; made grape, chokecherry, and wild plum preserves; and tea from sage leaves. She also knew what herbs to use for medicine. Amache's mother also taught her grandchildren of the ways of the Cheyenne people. She also kept a tepee at her home to keep her family grounded in these traditions. The Prowers were frequently visited by Amache's mother and other family members. Known for being a good and kind woman, she was active in school, church and community activities. She knew many Native American holy men and chiefs and was friends with Mary Bent, the daughter of Owl Woman and William Bent. She was a member of the Order of the Eastern Star.

The Kansas Pacific Railroad constructed a line that ran through Las Animas. (Note: John Prowers established a freight station near the railroad line and founded a bank in Las Animas.) In 1873, the Prowers family moved to Las Animas. John Wesley Prowers served in the territorial and state legislature. He died in 1884 and he was buried at Las Animas cemetery. For nine years, she received an annual stipend of $3,000 (equivalent to $107,500 in 2025) to raise her children. In 1891, she married Dan Keesee, a rancher or businessman. They visited Cambridge, Massachusetts, where she died in 1905.

=== Sand Creek massacre ===
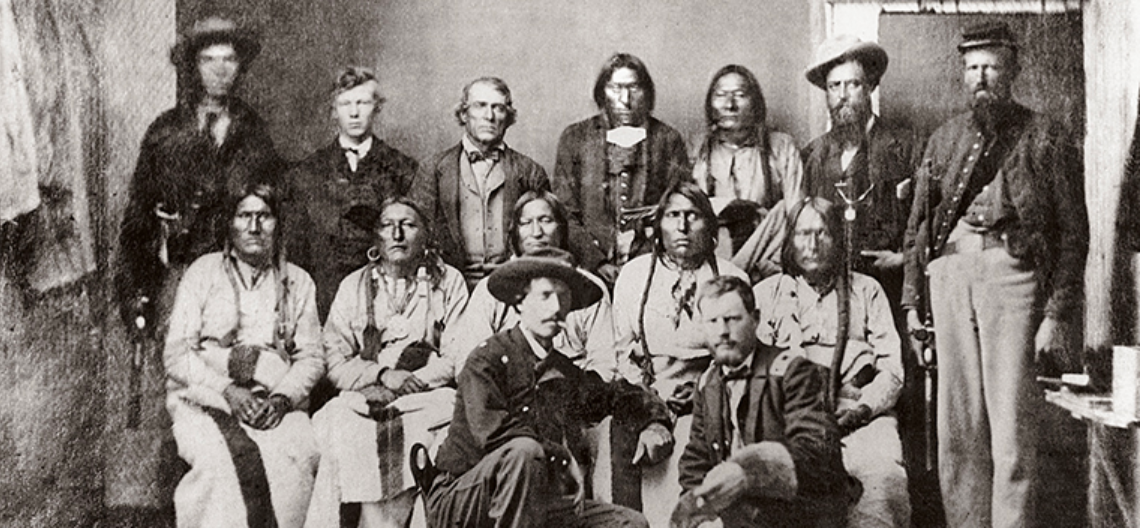
Cheyenne and Arapaho Delegation, Camp Weld, September 28, 1864. Ochinee is in the second row, second from the right.

Her father helped negotiate a treaty between the government, Cheyenne, and Arapaho to safely camp along Sand Creek during the winter of 1864–1865. At that time, he had met with the Territorial Governor, John Evans. Colonel John Chivington certified that Lone Bear was a man of good character and a "friendly Indian." Before the attack, the Prowers family, including Amache, were held hostage to prevent them from warning Cheyenne at the Sand Creek winter camp site of the eminent attack. (Note: It was also said that the Prowers family was at the Caddo Indian Agency, which had been abandoned during the Sand Creek massacre.)

I was taken prisoner one Sunday evening, about sundown, by men of company E, first cavalry of Colorado, by orders of Colonel Chivington… and not allowed to leave the house for two nights and a day and a half… because I had an Indian family. The colonel commanding thought I might communicate some news to the Indians encamped on Sand [C]reek.

— John Wesley Prowers

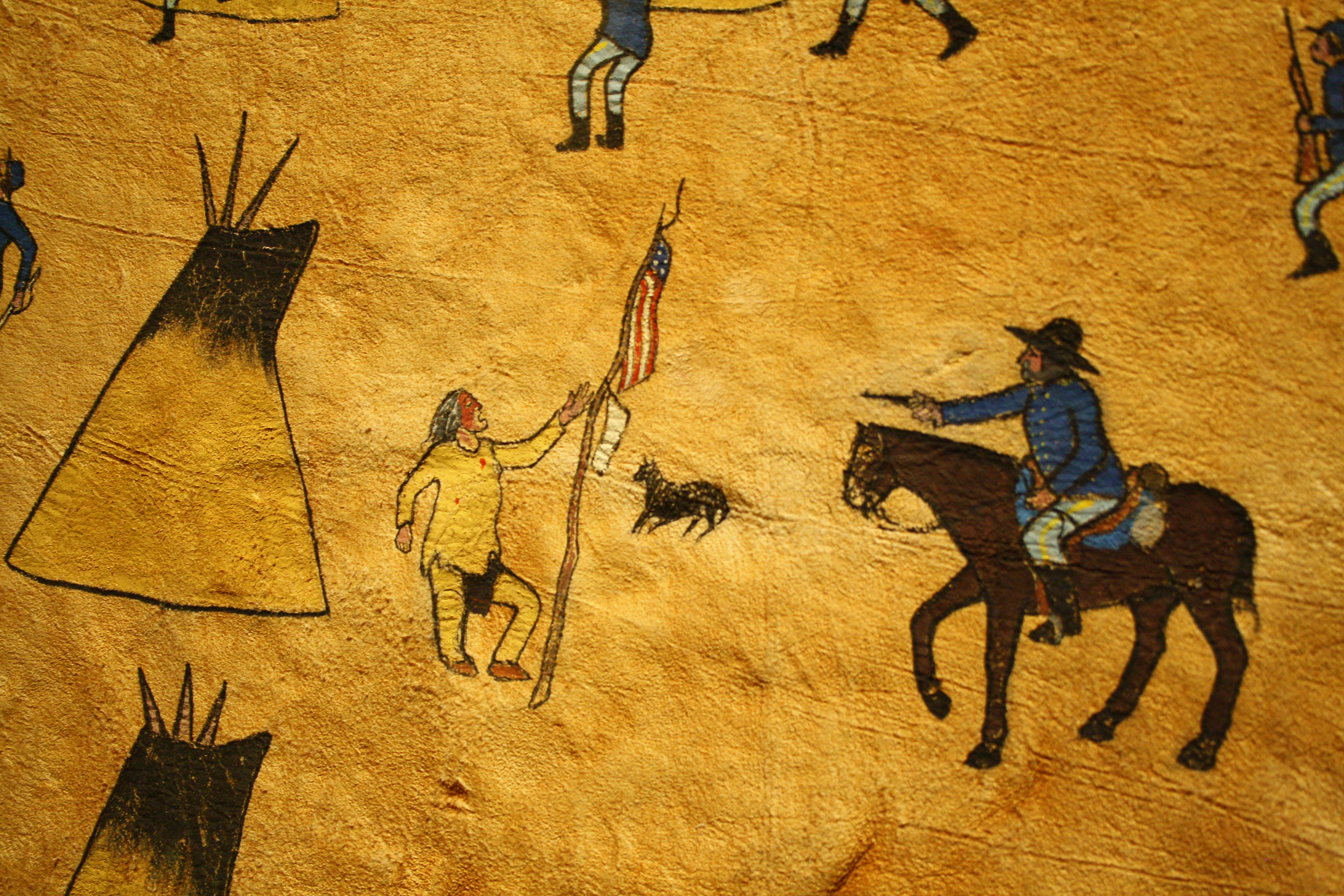
Portion of winter count depicting Black Kettle at Sand Creek. (Buffalo Bill Center of the West)

On November 29, 1864, the Cheyenne camp at the Sand Creek was attacked by 600 soldiers of the Colorado Volunteer Cavalry and her father, Peace Chief Ochinee (Lone Bear) and 160 other people, most of whom were children and women, were killed. Her mother was able to escape. The troops were led by Colonel John Chivington upon the orders of John Evans, the territorial governor of Colorado. Amache went later to the Congress with her husband and testified to seek justice for the Cheyenne. She and her two oldest daughters and her mother each received reparations by the United States government in the form of 640 acres of land along the Arkansas River. Amache used her land to expand her family's cattle ranch. (Note: Although land owned by American women went to their husbands if they were married, but the treaty that Amache and her female family members were subject to meant that they owned the land gained through reparations.) The rest of Lone Bear's family moved to Indian Territory, now Oklahoma. Years later, Amache was asked, as she was about to be introduced to Chivington at an Eastern Star meeting in Denver, whether she knew him. Her daughter Mary recounts that, "My mother drew herself up with that stately dignity, peculiar to her people, and ignoring the outstretched hand, remarked in perfect English, audible to all in the room, 'Know Col. Chivington? I should. He was my father's murderer!' and turned her back to him.

== Businesswoman ==
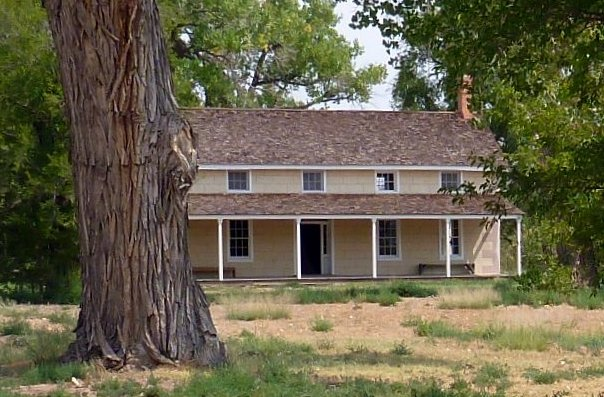
Prowers House in Boggsville, Colorado

Located on the Santa Fe Trail, she and her husband ran a store, hotel, post office, county office, and school where people of Euro-American, Native American, and Latin descent met and exchanged information. Prowers spoke English, Spanish, and the language of her birth, Cheyenne. She did not read or write, though. Their house, located in Boggsville, was in one of the earliest settlements in the area. Their neighbors included Kit Carson and his wife and Thomas Boggs, who established the settlement.

She helped run her family's cattle ranch, where her husband was believed to have brought the first Hereford cattle into Colorado. He began buying cattle in 1862 and was considered the first and largest rancher in the area. By 1881, they had 15,000 head of cattle. (Note: They are said to have amassed up to 50,000 cattle and were major landowners in the Big Timbers area of Colorado.) In the winters of 1885–1886 and 1886–1887, "intense blizzards" resulted in a tremendous loss of cattle in Colorado, nearly wiping out the cattle industry.

== Mediator ==
She became a leader in the Southern Cheyenne tribe and during Colorado's early years as a territory (1860s and 1870s), she was "an innovative mediator between cultures," including Mexican, Native American, and Euro-American people. As European Americans and Mexican Americans settled in Colorado, her diplomatic skills helped her protect the land that she received through treaty. Dr. Bonnie Clark, and archaeologist who wrote a biography of Amache Prowers, said of her, "Amache lived in a time that brought sweeping changes to the region, requiring the creation of a new society. Cultural mediators like Amache built the foundation of the American West."

== Death and legacy ==
She died in 1904 or 1905, in Cambridge, Massachusetts. She was buried at Las Animas cemetery.

Camp Amache, located near Granada, Colorado, was named after her after it was established in 1942. It was a Japanese-American internment camp during World War II. She was inducted into the Colorado Women's Hall of Fame in 2018.

== Archaeology ==
The house in Boggsville was the subject of an archaeological study by Richard Carrillo of the University of Denver and graduate student Carson Bear. A tip of a biface, a type of a stone tool, and flakes were found under the floorboards of the living room. The presence of a ground stone for processing traditional foods and a stone tool set indicates that she was making and using stone tools. It is rare to opine that a native woman made stone tools, because it was traditionally considered a function performed by men, the hunters. Cheyenne women used stone tools, though, for hide-working.
