= Ochinee =

Native American chief

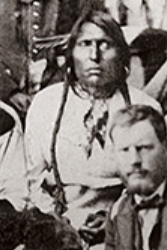
Ochinee of Cheyenne and Arapaho Delegation, Camp Weld, September 28, 1864

Ochinee (died November 29, 1864), also known as Lone Bear (Cheyenne: Náhkȯhno'kaestse) and One-Eye (Cheyenne: Ó'kénėstse), was a Native American Peace Chief of the Cheyenne tribe. He was the father of Amache Prowers, who was a tradeswoman, advocate, and leader among the Southern Cheyenne. Ochinee, who had worked to create peace for the Cheyenne, died during the Sand Creek massacre on November 29, 1864.

== Attempts to broker peace ==
Ochinee, a sub-chief, helped negotiate a treaty between the government, Cheyenne, and Arapaho to safely camp along Sand Creek during the winter of 1864–1865. Ochinee went to Fort Lyon on September 4, 1864 with his wife to deliver a letter to Major Ned Wynkoop from Black Kettle and other chiefs. Nervous soldiers tried to shoot him when he approached the fort. The letter conveyed that Cheyenne people were fearful of raids and were starving. Black Kettle released white people that the Cheyenne had taken captive and asked to discuss a solution for peace. Ochinee, his wife Minimic, and a man that had accompanied them, were put under guard and taken on a four-day ride with 127 soldiers and taken to an encampment of Arapaho and Cheyenne people on the Smoky Hill River. Wynkoop encouraged tribal chiefs, including Black Kettle and Arapaho Chief Niwot (Left Hand) to travel with him to Denver to meet with Territorial Governor, John Evans and Colonel John Chivington. The delegation left for Denver for the September 28 meeting at Camp Weld.

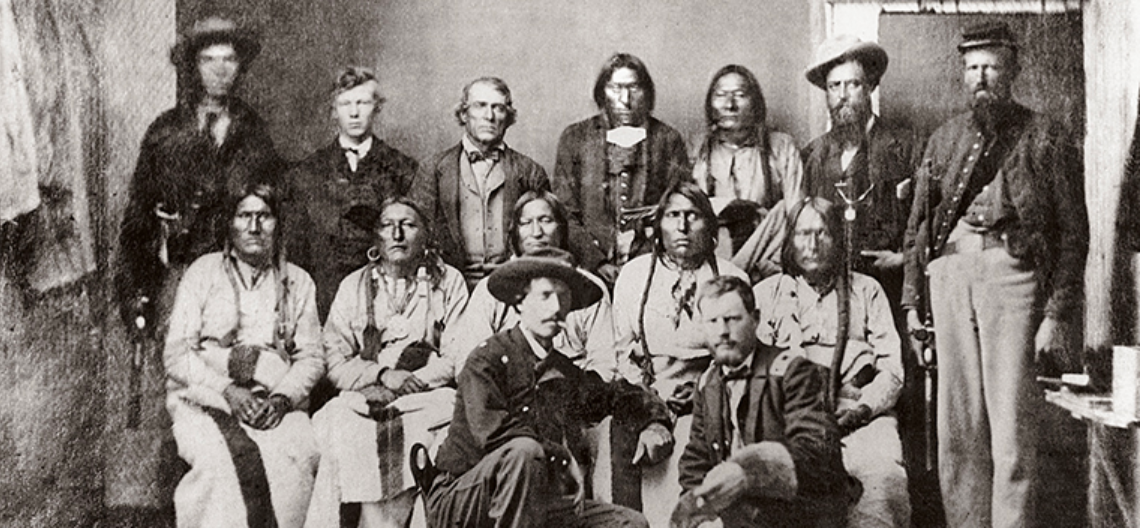
Cheyenne and Arapaho Delegation, Camp Weld, September 28, 1864

With other members of the delegation, he met with the Territorial Governor, John Evans. Colonel John Chivington certified that Ochinee was a man of good character and a "friendly Indian." Before the attack, the John Wesley Prowers family, including his daughter Amache Prowers, were held hostage to prevent them warning Cheyenne at the Sand Creek winter camp site of the eminent attack.

== Sand Creek massacre ==
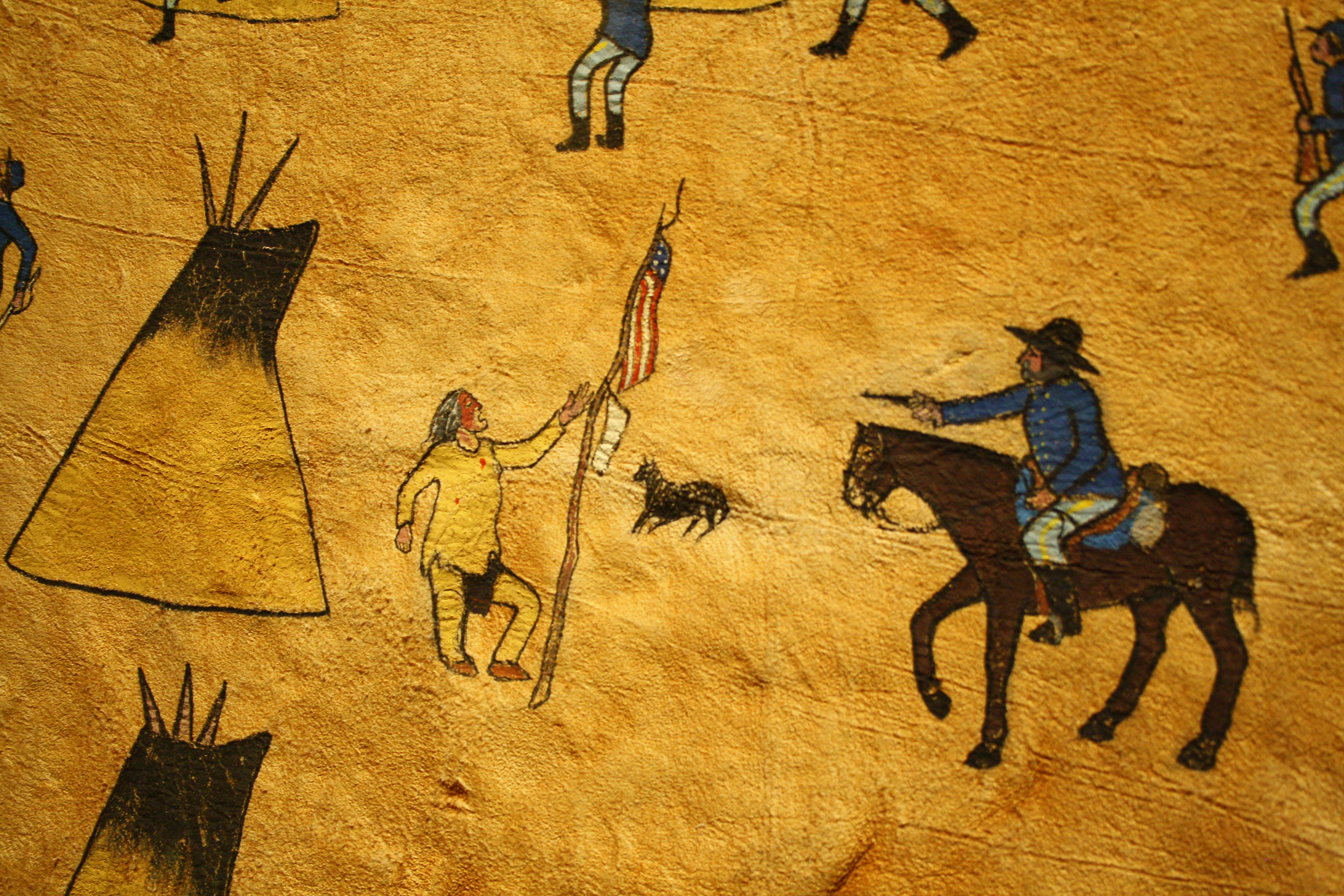
Portion of winter count depicting Black Kettle at Sand Creek. (Buffalo Bill Center of the West)

On November 29, 1864, the Cheyenne encampment at the Sand Creek was attacked by 600 soldiers of the Colorado Volunteer Cavalry and Ochinee and 160 other people, most of whom were children and women, were killed. The troops were led by Colonel John Chivington upon the orders of John Evans, the territorial governor of Colorado.

Grandfather Ochinee (One-Eye) escaped from the camp, but seeing all that his people were to be slaughtered, he deliberately chose to go back into the one-sided battle and die with them.

— Mary Prowers Hudnal, daughter of Amache Prowers

His wife was able to escape. Amache went later to the Congress with her husband and testified to seek justice for the Cheyenne. Cheyenne men sought retribution after the Sand Creek massacre. Called Cheyenne dog soldiers, they looted and terrorized the area.

Ochinee's wife, Amache, and her two oldest daughters each received reparations by the United States government in the form of 640 acres of land along the Arkansas River, which she used to expand her family's cattle ranch. (Note: Although land owned by American women went to their husbands if they were married, but the treaty that Amache and her female family members were subject to meant that they owned the land gained through reparations.) The rest of Ochinee's family moved to Indian Territory, now Oklahoma. (Note: Years later, Prowers was asked, as she was about to be introduced to Chivington at an Eastern Star meeting in Denver, whether she knew him. Her daughter Mary recounts that, "My mother drew herself up with that stately dignity, peculiar to her people, and ignoring the outstretched hand, remarked in perfect English, audible to all in the room, 'Know Col. Chivington? I should. He was my father's murderer!' and turned her back to him.)

== Personal life ==
Ochinee's wife was Minimic. He had a daughter, Amache, who married a white man, John Wesley Prowers. Minimic taught Amache how to make tepees from buffalo hides; how to make and decorate clothing from hides, beads, and animal teeth; and how to select wild plants for medicine, dyes, and food.

== Legacy ==
The Achonee Mountain in the Indian Peaks Wilderness was named after him.
