= Boggsville, Colorado =

Ghost town in Bent County, Colorado, United States

- Ghost town
- Location of Boggsville, Colorado. Boggsville (Colorado)
- Coordinates: 38°02′30″N 103°12′46″W
- Country: United States
- State: Colorado
- County: Bent
- Elevation: 3,914 ft (1,193 m)
- Time zone: UTC−07:00 (MST)
  - Summer (DST): UTC−06:00 (MDT)
- ZIP Code: 81054 (Las Animas)
- Area code: 719
- GNIS pop ID: 195528
- Boggsville
- U.S. National Register of Historic Places
- U.S. Historic district
- Colorado State Register of Historic Properties
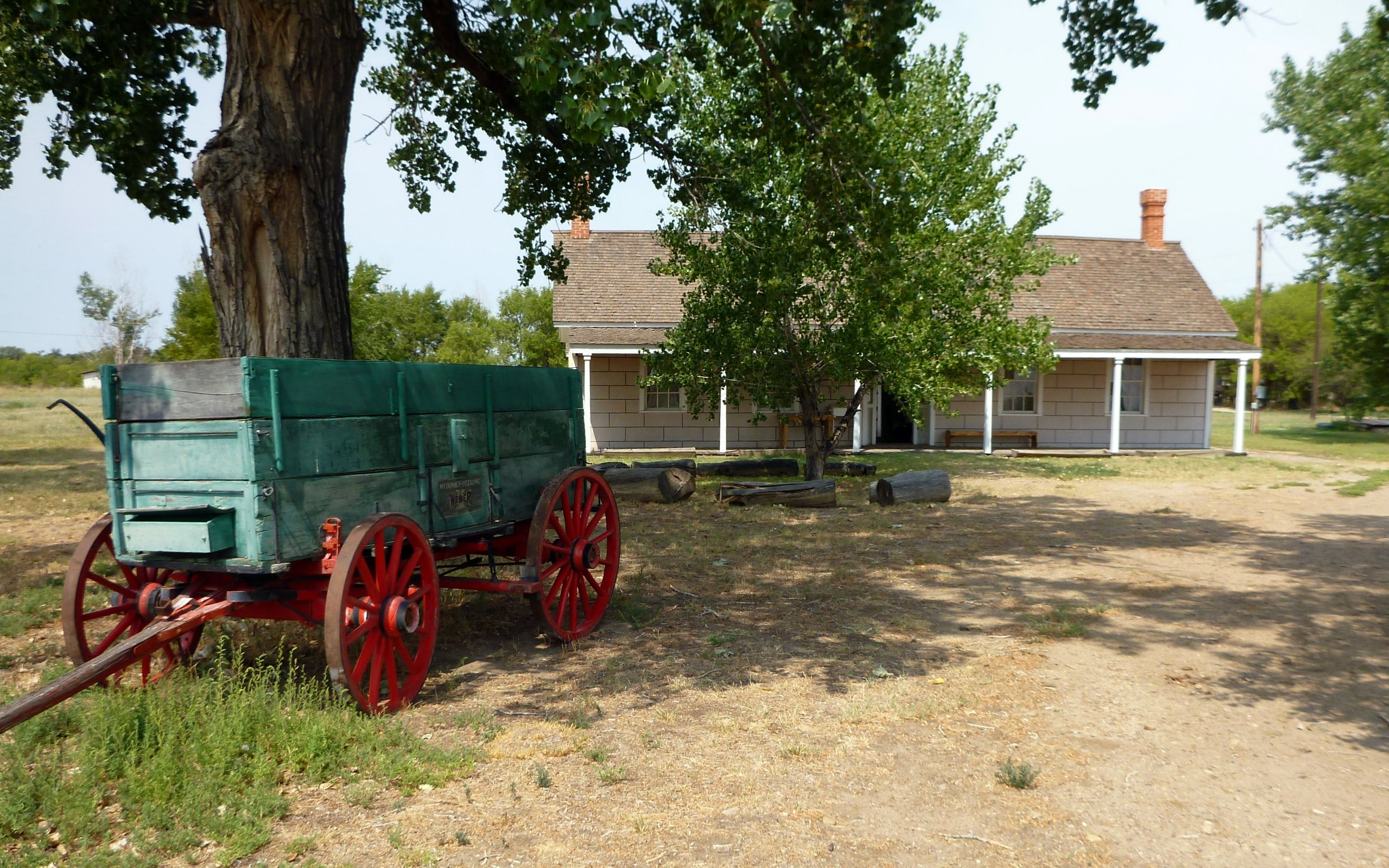
- The Boggs House
- Location: S. of Las Animas on SH 101, Las Animas, Colorado
- Area: 39 acres (16 ha)
- Built: 1866
- Architectural style: Territorial style
- NRHP reference No.: 86002841 (original); 100005980 (increase)
- CSRHP No.: 5BN.363

Significant dates
- Added to NRHP: October 24, 1986
- Boundary increase: May 23, 2022

Boggsville is an extinct town located in Bent County, Colorado, United States. The town was located near the Purgatoire River approximately 3 miles (4.8 km) upstream of the Purgatoire's confluence with the Arkansas River. The community lies along Highway 101 approximately two miles south of Las Animas. Boggsville served as the seat of Bent County, Colorado Territory, from 1870 until 1872.

== History ==
Boggsville was established in 1866. The surviving structures are among the earliest examples of Territorial architecture in Colorado. Boggsville was the last home of frontiersman Kit Carson before his death in 1868 at Fort Lyon.

The village was a stagecoach station on the Purgatory Branch of the Santa Fe Trail. With the establishment of Bent County in 1870, Boggsville became the county seat. The town was named for Thomas Oliver Boggs (1824-1894), an Indian trader from the Indian Territory and cattle dealer. In 1846 Boggs married 14-year-old Rumalda Luna Bent, the stepdaughter of Charles Bent, first American governor of New Mexico, who was an heiress to land grants in Colorado. In 1866 Boggs built an adobe house on the 2,040 acres (830 ha) grant. The next year John Wesley Prowers built a two-story 14-room house at Boggsville that functioned as a house, a school, and a stagecoach station.

In 1867 the citizens of Boggsville dug the Tarbox Ditch from the Purgatoire 7 miles (11 km) to about 1,000 acres (400 ha) of irrigated land. The ditch was the first such irrigation project in southeastern Colorado.

In 1870, the voters of Bent County, moved the county seat from Las_Animas to Boggsville, but two years later, voters moved the county seat back to Las_Animas. At that time Boggsville had 97 voting citizens. The same year, the town was bypassed by the Atchison, Topeka and Santa Fe Railway and the Kansas Pacific Railroad. Prowers moved to West Las Animas and became a cattle rancher and politician. Boggs, who was the first sheriff of Bent County and who was elected to the territorial legislature in 1871, moved to Springer, New Mexico in 1877 after his wife's land grants were contested. After the departure of Prowers and Boggs the property was sold, becoming the San Patricio Ranch of 3,000 acres (1,200 ha) under the Lee family.

Boggsville never had a U.S. post office. The U.S. Post Office at Las Animas (ZIP Code 81054) serves Boggsville postal addresses.

== Description ==
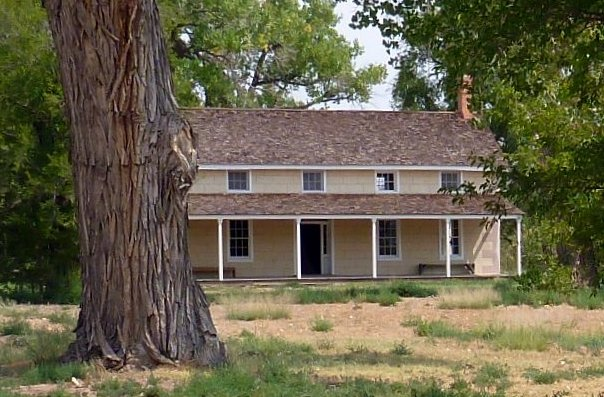
Prowers House in Boggsville, Colorado

The Boggsville site is at the center of a large farm, of which 39 acres (16 ha) were donated to the Pioneer Historical Society of Bent County containing the Boggs and Prowers houses, which are the only remaining historic structures. There had been at one time thirteen permanent buildings in the village, one of which was the home of Kit Carson from December 1867 until Carson's death in May 1868. The Carson House was destroyed in a 1921 flood.

The Boggs House has been unoccupied since 1975. It is U-shaped but was originally L-shaped. The one-story adobe structure combines features of Territorial architecture and Greek Revival characteristics. The Prowers House was last inhabited in the 1950s The rectangular house was partly collapsed by the 1980s, with portions removed as early as the 1920s. The Powers House is adobe, with interior woodwork brought to the site from St. Louis. There are a further five outbuildings associated with the Boggs House.

The Boggs and Prowers houses have been restored by the Pioneer Historical Society of Bent County, and the site is open to the public. Boggsville was placed on the National Register of Historic Places on October 24, 1986.

== Notable persons ==
- Thomas Oliver Boggs, Indian trader, businessman, sheepherder and sheriff
- Kit Carson, frontiersman, fur trapper, wilderness guide, Indian agent, and U.S. Army officer.
- Amache Prowers, Native American activist, cattle rancher, advocate, and storeowner.

== See also ==
- List of county seats in Colorado
