= Bent's New Fort =

Archaeological site in Bent County, Colorado, United States

- Santa Fe Trail Mountain Route--Bent's New Fort
- U.S. National Register of Historic Places
- Colorado State Register of Historic Properties No. 5BN.394
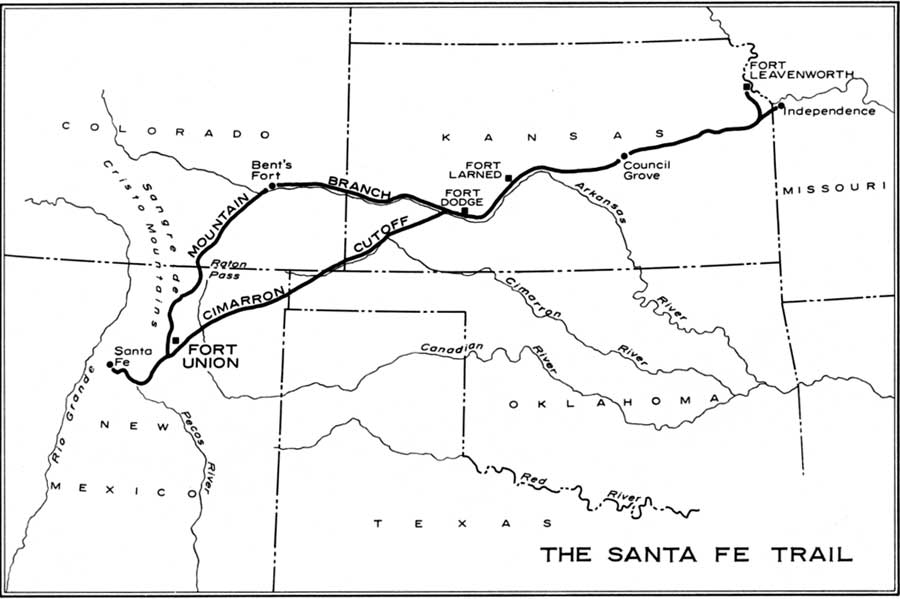
- Map of the historic Santa Fe Trail in the southwestern United States around 1860

- Location within the United States Location within Colorado
- Location: near Lamar, Colorado
- Coordinates: 38.0939°N 102.7605°W
- Built: 1853
- NRHP reference No.: 16000666
- CSRHP No.: 5BN.394

Significant dates
- Added to NRHP: September 26, 2016
- Designated CSRHP: 2016

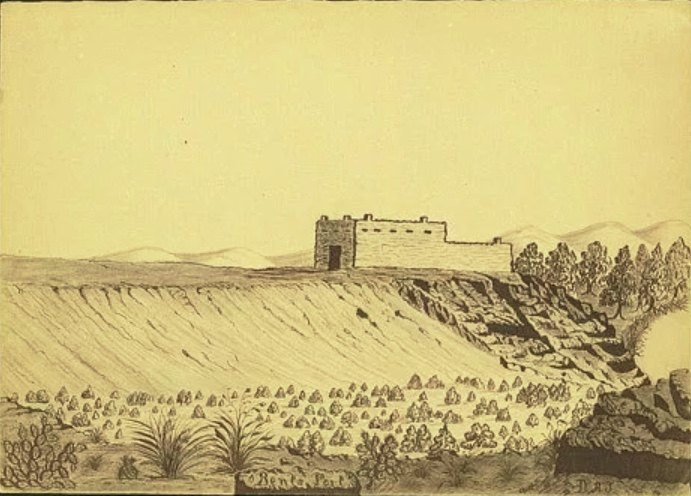
Daniel Jenks traveled to the Colorado Territory in 1859 in search of gold. While there, he made this sketch of Bent's New Fort, which is one of the earliest known images of the fort. Photo courtesy Library of Congress, Prints and Photographs Dept.

Bent's New Fort was a historic fort and trading post along the banks of the Arkansas River in what is now Bent County, Colorado, about nine miles west of Lamar, on the Mountain Route branch of the Santa Fe Trail. William Bent operated a trading post with limited success at the site and in 1860 leased the fort to the United States government, which operated it as a military outpost until 1867. In 1862, it was named Fort Lyon. The fort was abandoned after a flood of the Arkansas River in 1867.

The ruins of the fort and a portion of the Santa Fe Trail were listed as Santa Fe Trail Mountain Route-Bent's New Fort on the U.S. National Register of Historic Places in 2016.

== Description ==
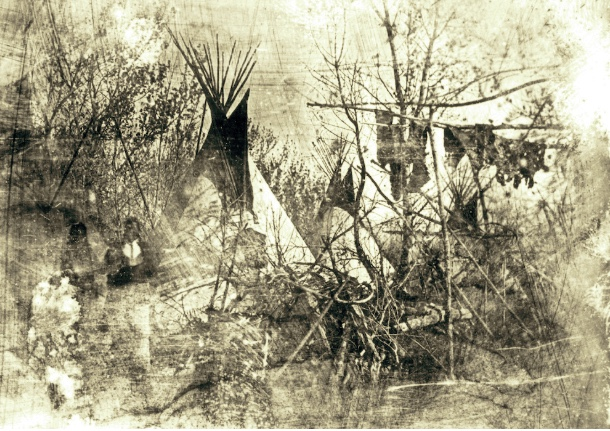
The only surviving daguerreotype from Solomon Nunes Carvalho's journey West in 1853 depicts a view of the Cheyenne village at Big Timbers. A pair of figures stand to the left; drying hides hang on the right. Courtesy of Library of Congress.

In 1849, William Bent built a wooden stockade for a fort and trading post. It was a U-shaped structure of three connected log cabins. The open side faced the Arkansas River.

He then built a rectangular limestone or sandstone trading post and fort in the summer and early fall of 1853. Built near the Cheyenne and Arapaho camping ground, Big Timbers, the fort was a little smaller than the adobe Bent's Old Fort, which had been destroyed by fire by Bent in 1849 during a severe cholera epidemic that decimated the southern Cheyenne. (Note: There are two alternative theories. One is that he destroyed the fort rather that have Native Americans used it as a stronghold against the United States Army. Alternatively, it was destroyed to prevent the Army from taking the fort without paying him.) (Note: It was also in 1849 that the Bent, St. Vrain & Company trading organization was dissolved.) The new building, with 16-foot walls, had twelve rooms built around a central courtyard. For defense, cannons sat in the corners of the roof and there were parapets.

The new fort was built on a hill overlooking the Arkansas River with a view for miles of the Santa Fe Trail. In a defensive position, it was situated between a limestone cliff to the east and a rock bluff to the south.

The fort was staffed by about ten Native American, French-Canadian, Mexican, and white American men. Described as a "motley crew", some of the men had been trappers. Most had at least one Native American wife.

== History ==
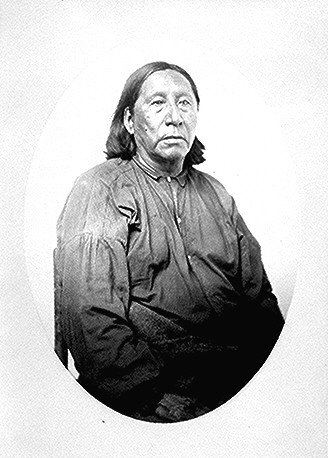
Little Raven, Southern Arapaho leader, some time between 1868 and 1874

Sufficient merchandise had arrived so that Bent could resume trading with Native Americans. However, Bent had not been able to sustain trading to the same levels of the 1830s and 1840s at the Old Fort. The steady stream of westward travelers had reduced wildlife, including buffalo. For example, cutting down cottonwood trees adversely affecting habitat for wildlife, reducing game available for hunting. The fur trade had also declined significantly. All of this resulted in hunger among Native Americans and fewer buffalo hides that could be traded for goods. For instance, the Arapaho, led by Little Raven, who camped near the fort had difficulty sustaining life by 1857 and children had distended stomachs from starvation. Hunger, plans for a railroad to cut through Cheyenne and Arapaho hunting grounds, and the increased pressure of settlers resulted in apprehension among Native Americans.

This new trading post was not profitable and in July 1857, Bent leased it briefly to the United States Army and ran it again as a trading post. By 1860, an area near the fort was a distribution point for annuity goods for the Cheyenne and Arapaho, who were starving and in need of the provisions as they headed east for a buffalo hunt; "their women and children had become very faint and hungry." Bent refused to use the fort as storage facilities because it would become a potential area of conflict and theft. Annuity goods were provided by treaties in exchange for reduced access to ancestral land, such as hunting grounds.

In July 1860, the Army rented the facility and used it for storage of annuity goods for the Cheyenne and Arapaho. (Note: There are some sources that state that the government bought the fort. That is not so, the government just leased the fort.) Barracks were built around the fort and additional defensive features were added, like diamond-shaped gun emplacements on newly-erected earthenworks that surrounded the fort. The Army facility was initially named Fort Flaunteroy, then Fort Wise, and then Fort Lyon. The Bent's Fort, Colorado Territory, post office operated from June 4, 1863, until December 2, 1873. The Army was located at the fort until 1867 when it moved to the new Fort Lyon fort following flooding of the Arkansas River. The site was not used after the Army relocated.

When Bent leased the fort to the Army, he moved to south side of the Arkansas River at the mouth of the Purgatoire River near Boggsville and built a stockade called Purgatory Stockade. He lived there until his death in 1869. All that remains are ruins of the foundation of the former fort. The fort is on private land.

== See also ==
- List of forts in Colorado
