= Thomas Oliver Boggs =

Colorado pioneer

- Born: August 22, 1824; Papinville, Missouri, U.S.
- Died: September 29, 1894 (aged 70); Clayton, New Mexico, U.S.
- Other names: White Horse, Tomás Boggs, Uncle Tom
- Occupations: Indian trader, sheep rancher, businessman, sheriff
- Known for: Boggsville, Colorado

Thomas Oliver Boggs (August 22, 1824 – September 29, 1894) was a southwestern pioneer who worked as an Indian trader, businessman, sheepherder and sheriff and who lived and worked in Kansas, Colorado, New Mexico, and California. Boggsville, Colorado is named for him.

== Early life ==
Boggs was born in Papinville, Missouri on August 22, 1824. His father, Lilburn Boggs, served as the Governor of Missouri from 1836 to 1840. His mother, Panthea Boone Boggs, was a granddaughter of Daniel Boone. His parents had ten children. Thomas was their firstborn. He left home at an early age and worked for his uncle Albert G. Boone at Fort Osage in Missouri and later in Fort Scott, Kansas. He headed further west when he was 16 or 17, ending up at Bent's Fort in Colorado. He worked as an Indian trader for the Bent Brothers there for about the next 16 years. He made several trading trips to Mexico during this time, when the Mexican border was much closer to Colorado than it is today. Eventually, he was based in Taos, New Mexico and worked for the Bent-St. Vrain Trading Company.

In 1846, he married 14-year-old María Rumalda Luna Bent, the stepdaughter of Charles Bent, in Taos. There he became friends with Kit Carson, a friendship that lasted until Carson's death. During the Mexican-American War, Boggs was drafted to serve as a courier, carrying military correspondence between Taos and Fort Leavenworth. In about 1850, he and his wife followed his parents to Bodega Bay, California, where the couple lived for five years. In 1855, missing New Mexico, Boggs and his family moved to Rayado, New Mexico. Here he worked on the Maxwell Land Grant running cattle north and south to and from southeastern Colorado. In 1866, Boggs moved his family again, this time to what would later be called Boggsville, in Bent County, Colorado, on Colorado's Eastern Plains, where he built an adobe house.

== Boggsville ==
In Boggsville, Boggs became the first sheriff of Bent County in 1870 when the county was organized. In 1871, he was elected to represent Bent and Greenwood counties in the 9th Colorado Territorial General Assembly. He ran for office as a Democrat. However, he never attended any of the legislative sessions. He focused instead on sheep ranching and by 1875 he owned 17,000 head of sheep. He also ran a shearing operation for his and other nearby ranches.

He and his family moved to Springer, New Mexico in 1877 in the wake of ownership disputes involving his Boggsville property. His son Charlie was murdered near there in 1887.

== Last years and death ==
In 1888, he and his wife traveled to Clayton, New Mexico and moved in with their daughter Minnie and her husband, George A. Bushnell, who was employed there as auditor for the Maxwell Land Grant Company.

Thomas Oliver Boggs died in Clayton on September 29, 1894, and is buried there. His wife Rumalda died about twelve years later, on January 13, 1906.
