= Big Timbers =

Wooded area in Colorado, United States

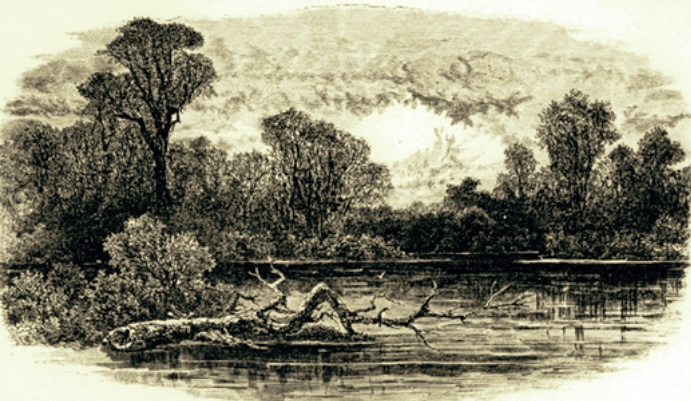
Big Timbers along the Arkansas River. An illustration from Richard Irving Dodge (1883). Our Wild Indians; Thirty-three Years' Personal Experience Among the Red Men of the Great West

Big Timbers is a wooded riparian area in Colorado along both banks of the Arkansas River that is famous as a campsite for Native American tribes and travelers on the Mountain Branch of the Santa Fe Trail.

== Description ==
The Spanish knew this area as La Casa de Palo or the House of Wood, because wood was scarce along the banks of the Arkansas River except for that specific area. Cottonwood was the primary type of timber found there. It was known by its Spanish name following Juan Bautista de Anza's defeat of Cuerno Verde and the parties signed a peace treaty there in 1785–1786. At its greatest extent, Big Timbers may have stretched from the mouth of the Purgatoire to the present-day Kansas-Colorado border, a distance of 100 kilometres (62 miles)

== Winter camping ground ==
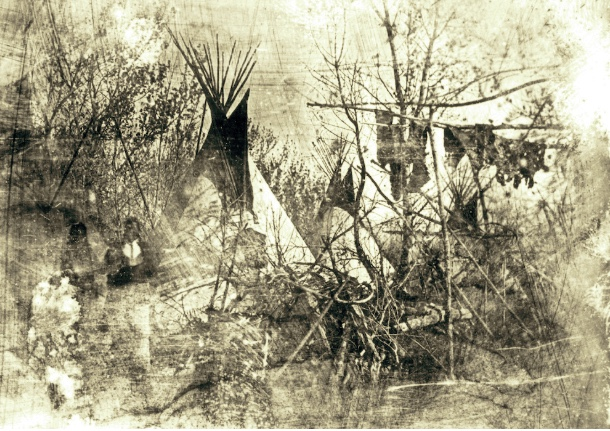
The only surviving daguerreotype from Solomon Nunes Carvalho's journey West in 1853 depicts a view of the Cheyenne village at Big Timbers. A pair of figures stand to the left; drying hides hang on the right. Courtesy of Library of Congress.

Seasonally the Cheyenne that camped at Bent's Old Fort moved 30 miles (48 km) down the Arkansas River from their camp to Big Timbers. (Note: Big Timbers later became the site of Bent's New Fort, built to replace the original after it was destroyed in mysterious circumstances in 1849 around the time of the Oklahoma cholera epidemic.) Alongside the Arkansas River for 40 miles (64 km) Big Timbers was a prime location for hunting buffalo, a major source of food for the Cheyenne. The tribe also lived on roots and berries. Big Timbers was their desired camp site in the winter, due to the relatively mild weather.

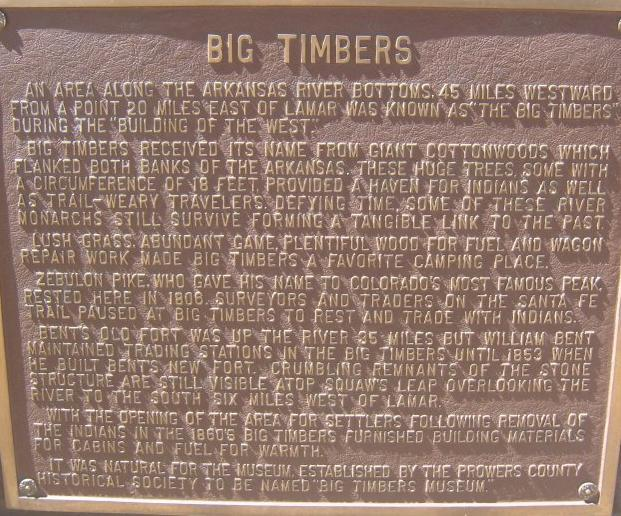
Plaque erected by Prowers County Historical Society at Big Timbers Museum, Lamar, Colorado

According to Hyde, William Bent's wife, Owl Woman and her children traveled with her tribe to Big Timbers during the winter months and were at the fort itself during the summer. During the Cheyenne's winter visit to Big Timbers, Bent accompanied his family with goods for trading. At Big Timbers, Bent lived in accordance with Cheyenne customs which was a more casual, unstructured way of life. His life at Bent's Fort was somewhat structured with William having a leadership role.

Such was the rhythm of village life. Always movement — sometimes to Big Timbers close to the buffalo herds, sometimes to the fort, but always someplace where grass was thick, wood plentiful, and water fresh and sweet.

== Trading ==
A favorite camping ground for the Cheyenne and Arapaho, William Bent located Bent's New Fort near Big Timbers and present-day Lamar to trade with the Native Americans. Alexander Barclay and William Tharp also traded at Big Timbers.
