= Sand Creek (Denver, Colorado) =

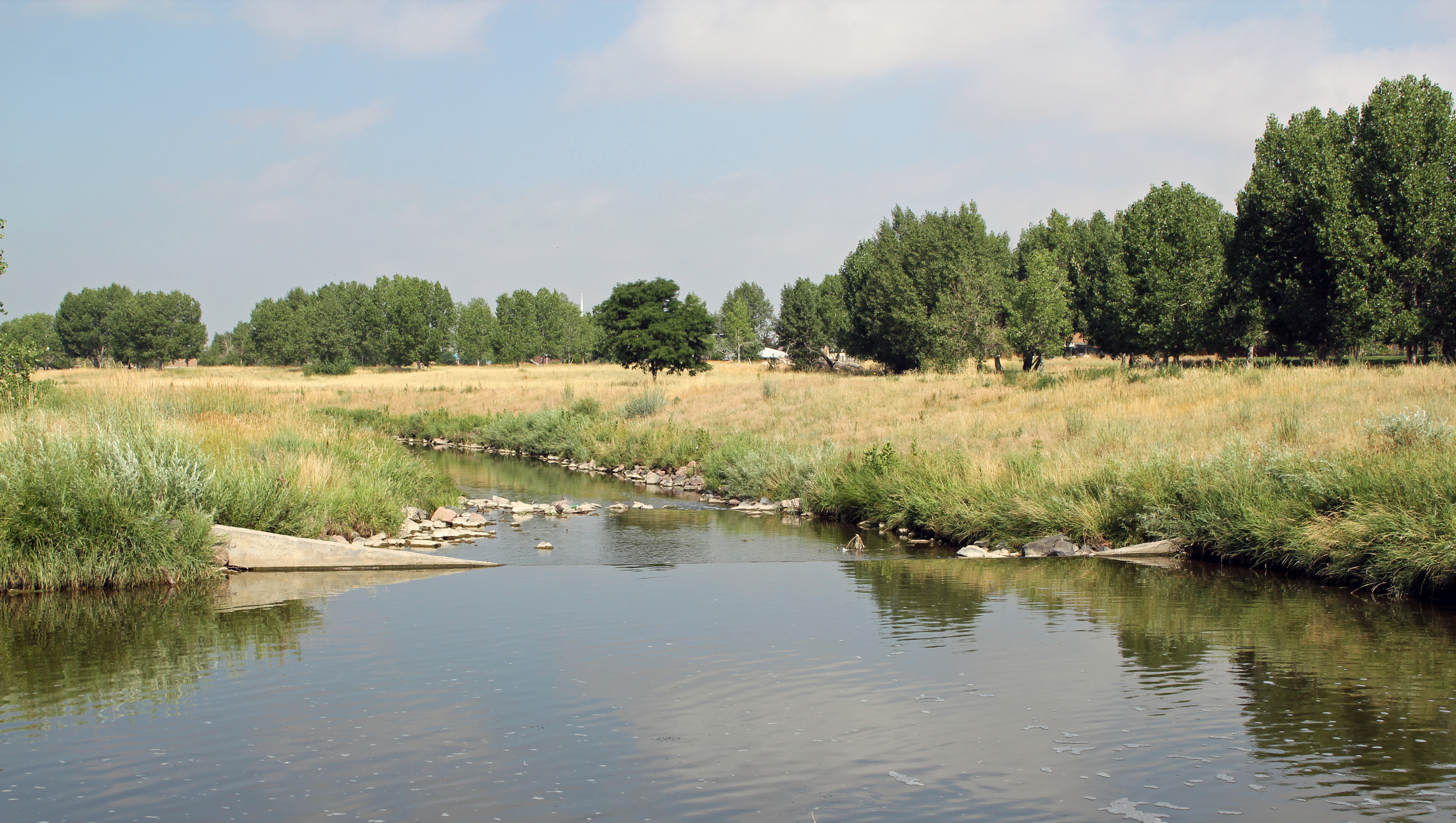
- The creek as it flows through Sand Creek Park in Aurora, north of the Anschutz Medical Campus.

Physical characteristics
- Source
  - location: Arapahoe County, Colorado
  - coordinates: 39°43′13″N 104°44′21″W
- Mouth
  - location: Confluence with the South Platte
  - coordinates: 39°48′47″N 104°57′08″W
  - elevation: 5,095 ft (1,553 m)

Basin features
- Progression: South Platte—Platte— Missouri—Mississippi

Sand Creek is a 14.6-mile-long (23.5 km) tributary that flows into the South Platte River near Commerce City, Colorado. From its source in unincorporated Arapahoe County, it flows through the cities of Aurora and Denver before joining the South Platte in Adams County.

It is not to be confused with Big Sandy Creek (along which the Sand Creek Massacre occurred), which is over 100 miles to the southeast.

== Benzene pollution in Sand Creek ==
In November 2011, a local fisherman noticed an oily sheen on the surface of Sand Creek. Testing found the water of Sand Creek to be contaminated with abnormally high levels of the aromatic hydrocarbon, benzene. The source of the benzene was found to be a damaged pipe at the nearby Suncor refinery, which had allowed benzene to seep into the groundwater and surface at Sand Creek. In December 2011, the Colorado Department of Health and Environment began to monitor benzene levels at the junction of Sand Creek and the South Platte River. The results of this monitoring showed benzene levels ranging from 140 ppb to 730 ppb – far above the national limit of 5 ppb, which is set by the EPA. Further downriver in the South Platte, benzene levels were also found to be significantly elevated, ranging from 130 ppb to 190 ppb. Although the source of the benzene has been fixed, levels still remain above the EPA standard for drinking water. This is of concern because the South Platte River is drawn on for drinking water by nearby communities and is frequently used for recreational activities such as swimming and fishing.

== See also ==
- List of rivers of Colorado
