= Fort Lyon =

United States historic place in Colorado

- U.S. National Register of Historic Places
- U.S. Historic district
- Colorado State Register of Historic Properties
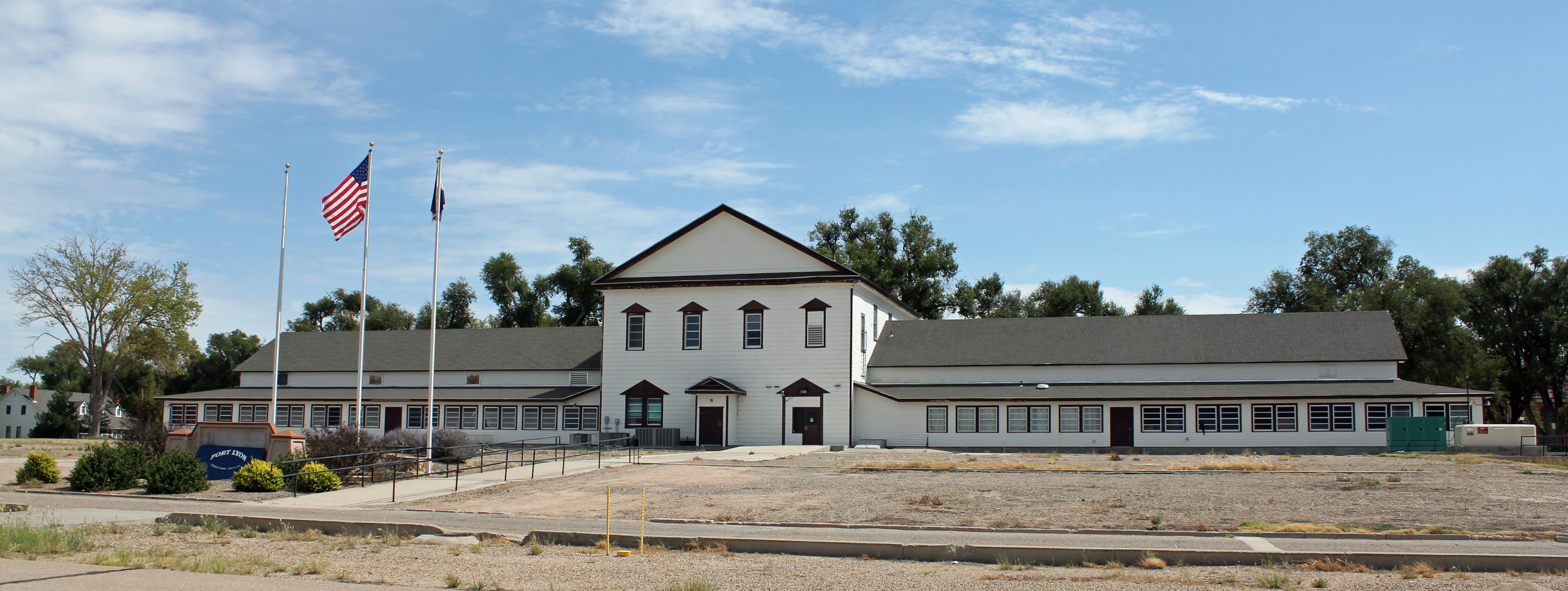
- One of the Fort's main buildings in 2013.

- Location within Colorado Location within the United States
- Location: Bent County, Colorado
- Nearest city: Las Animas
- Coordinates: 38°04′27″N 103°07′57″W
- Built: The second Fort Lyon was built in 1867
- Architect: U.S. Army; et al.
- Architectural style: Colonial Revival, Bungalow/Craftsman
- NRHP reference No.: 04000388
- CSRHP No.: 5BN.117
- Added to NRHP: 5 May 2004

Fort Lyon was composed of two 19th-century military fort complexes in southeastern Colorado. The initial fort, also called Fort Wise, operated from 1860 to 1867. After a flood in 1866, a new fort was built near Las Animas, Colorado, which operated as a military post until 1897.

It has been used as a United States Army fort, a sanatorium, a neuropsychiatry facility, and a minimum security prison. The state closed the prison in 2011, and in early 2013 proposed to use the site as a rehabilitation center for homeless people. Then in late 2013 it became a rehabilitative transitional housing facility for homeless people with some form of substance abuse problem. This is run by the Colorado Coalition for the Homeless and has been a developing program to the present day.

The fort is listed on the National Register of Historic Places. Part of the site, the Fort Lyon National Cemetery, which began burials in 1907, remains open.

== History ==
=== Fort Lyon (1860–1867) ===
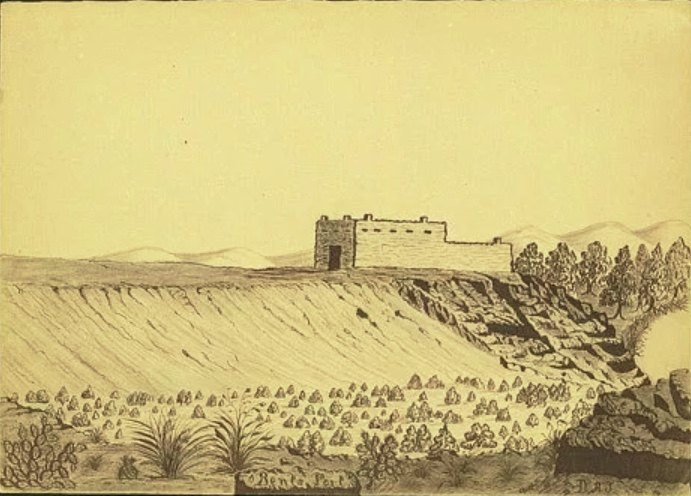
Bent's New Fort was rented to the U.S. government and used as a military post from 1860 to 1867

In July 1860, the Army rented Bent's New Fort and used it for storage of annuity goods for the Cheyenne and Arapaho. (Note: There are some sources that state that the government bought the fort. That is not so, the government just leased the fort.) Annuity goods were provided by treaties in exchange for reduced access to ancestral land, such as hunting grounds. Barracks were built around the fort and additional defensive features were added, like diamond-shaped gun emplacements on newly erected earthenworks that surrounded the fort.

At the same time (1860) the Army constructed a new fort about one-half mile west of Bent's New Fort adjacent to the Arkansas river, naming it Fort Wise for Henry A. Wise, the governor of Virginia. After the start of the American Civil War and Virginia's secession from the Union, it was renamed Fort Lyon in 1862 for Brigadier General Nathaniel Lyon, who had been the first Union general killed in the Civil War.

In 1861, the Treaty of Fort Wise was signed at the fort. The goal, which was short-lived, was to ensure peace between settlers and the Cheyenne and Arapaho people. Old Fort Lyon was the staging post used by Colonel John Chivington in 1864 as he led an attack on friendly Cheyenne and Arapaho camps that became known as the Sand Creek massacre. To prevent word spreading of the impending attack, Chivington had guards posted at the fort to prevent people and mail from reaching Sand Creek.

In 1866, after flooding on the Arkansas River, the U.S. Army relocated Fort Lyon 20 miles downstream to a site near Las Animas. The new facility was completed in 1867 and the old site, including Bent's New Fort, was abandoned.

=== Fort Lyon (1867–1897) ===
In 1867, a new fort called Fort Lyon was built near the present-day town of Las Animas, Colorado. The U.S. Army used Fort Lyon until 1897, when they abandoned it after the end of the Indian Wars.

=== Medical, prison, and psychiatric facilities ===
In 1906, the U.S. Navy opened a sanatorium there to treat sailors and Marines with tuberculosis. The dry climate and rest by isolation at the fort were thought to be beneficial by contemporary treatment methods. On 22 June 1922, the Veteran's Bureau assumed operations. In 1930, administration of the hospital was transferred to the newly created Veterans Administration. Within three years, the VA designated Fort Lyon a neuropsychiatry facility. In 2001 the hospital was closed and the facility was turned over to the state of Colorado for conversion to a minimum security prison. The prison was closed in 2011.

In September 2013, Governor John Hickenlooper announced that Fort Lyon had reopened as an isolated transitional housing facility for homeless people with substance abuse issues operated by the Colorado Coalition for the Homeless. As of November 2018, there were over 200 clients there.

== See also ==
- Bent's Old Fort National Historic Site
- Fort Reynolds (Colorado)
