= Little Hawk (Crazy Horse's brother) =

Oglala warrior

Little Hawk (Lakota: Čhetáŋ Čík'ala; c. 1842–1871) was the younger half brother of Oglala warrior Crazy Horse # 3. He was the offspring of the remarriage of Worm, Crazy Horse's #2, his widowed father, to a pair of sisters of the Brulé Lakota chief Spotted Tail, Iron Between Horns and Kills Enemy.

The name Little Hawk was given to Crazy Horse # 3's younger brother by uncle Little Hawk, who then took the name Long Face.

According to He Dog, Little Hawk liked fast horses and was a risk-taker.

Little Hawk was killed on a war expedition, south of the Platte River.

Crazy Horse, upon hearing of his brother's death, traveled to locate Little Hawk's remains. After preparing Little Hawk's remains, Crazy Horse killed Little Hawk's horse so that the horse could help Little Hawk travel to the spirit world.

Little Hawk's uncle abandoned his name Long Face and took back the name "Little Hawk" again. Tribal elders were said to have believed that Crazy Horse's half-brother would have been a greater man than his brother, had he lived.
