= Little Hawk =

Oglala Lakota leader (died 1900)

- Čhetáŋ Čík’ala
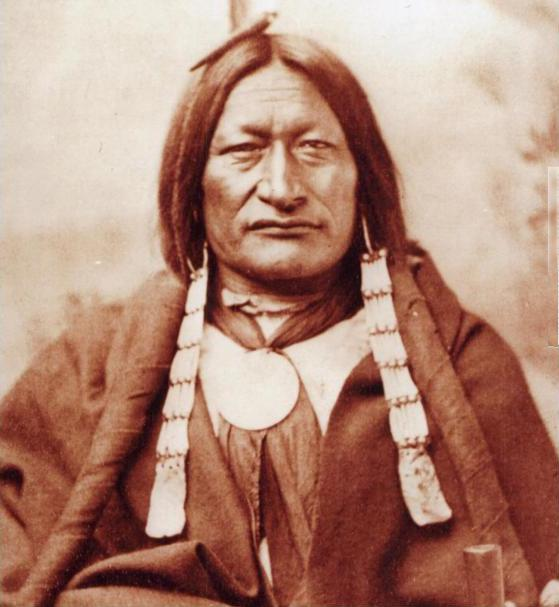
- Little Hawk at the Red Cloud Agency 1877

Oglala Lakota leader

Personal details
- Born: c. 1836 Dakota
- Died: 1900 Pine Ridge
- Spouse(s): Sunk ska win, White Horse Woman (possibly his second wife)
- Relations: Half-brother of Worm
- Children: Luke Little Hawk
- Known for: Chief
- Parents: Makes the Song (father); Good Haired Otter Woman (mother)

Little Hawk (Lakota: Čhetáŋ Čík’ala) (c. 1836–1900) was an Oglala Lakota war chief and a half-brother of Worm, father of Crazy Horse (Lakota: Tashunka-witko).

== Family ==
Little Hawk was born about 1836. His father was the holy man variously called Makes the Song or Crazy Horse I. Makes The Song was also the father of Worm (Crazy Horse II), who became the father of the famous Crazy Horse III. Little Hawk was born to a different mother from Worm; her name was Good Haired Otter. In the Lakota extended family scheme, Crazy Horse was thus a brother of Little Hawk.

His wife in the census records is always listed as Sunk-ska-win White Horse Woman (sometimes by misreading as 'White House'). In the Pine Ridge Agency allotment records she is noted as a sister of Iron Hawk. White Horse Woman stated that she was married to Little Hawk for thirty years before his death, which indicates that she was probably not the mother of Little Hawk's children born before 1870, which would be Made an Enemy, Hard to Kill, Yellow Wolf, and Iron Tail. White Horse was the mother of Little Hawk's children born after 1870 – including Chase in Morning, Many Cartridges, and Luke Little Hawk (also known as Hairless).

== Name ==
One of Little Hawk's nephews (younger brother of Crazy Horse 3), whom he gave his name and took the name Long Face, was killed in 1871 around the age 29 on a war expedition south of the Platte River. 'Long Face' then took back his name Little Hawk. This naming custom sometimes leads to confusion in attributing deeds to family members

== Life ==
Through the 1860s and 1870s, Little Hawk had participated in the fights alongside his famous nephew – just four years younger - Crazy Horse. According to official data, he was one of the participants in The Battle of the Little Big Horn. Committed by political and personal imperatives to preserve his people's hunting grounds, and reluctant to follow Sitting Bull (Lakota: Tatanka Yotanka) into Canadian exile, Little Hawk chose to fight alongside his nephew against the U.S. troops.

According to General George Crook's notes, Little Hawk " ... appeared to rank next to Crazy Horse in importance, was much like his superior in size and build, but his face was more kindly in expression and he was more fluent in speech; he did most of the talking."

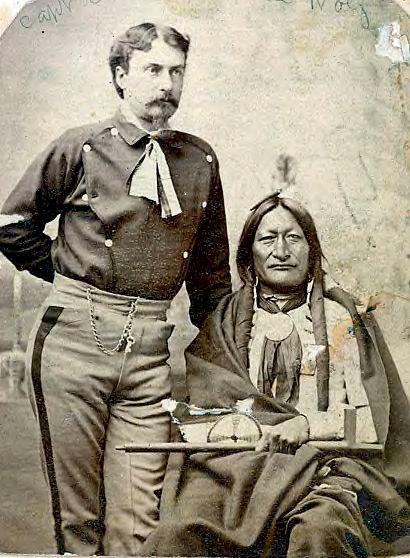
Photographed by D.S. Mitchell. Lt. Willam Philo Clark stands next to Little Hawk at the Red Cloud Agency in 1877 National Anthropological Archives

Crazy Horse arrived at Fort Robinson near the Red Cloud agency on May 6, 1877; together with Little Hawk, He Dog, Little Big Man, Iron Crow, they met in a solemn ceremony with First Lieutenant William P. Clark as the first step in their formal surrender. Some who witnessed the surrender caught the glint of silver on Little Hawk's neck. The shimmering came from a peace medal stamped with the image of President James Monroe. According to John G. Bourke's On the Border with Crook, when Little Hawk and Crazy Horse surrendered in 1877 Bourke noticed "...Little Hawk wore pendent at his neck the silver medal given to his father at the Peace Conference on the North Platte, in 1817 it bore the effigy of President Monroe." However, other accounts note that Little Hawk mentioned that the peace medal had been presented to his grandfather and that his grandfather had passed it along to him. After sixty years' wear, the symbol of friendship had become a mere decoration.

The last of the Northern Oglala tiyóšpaye was the Hunkpatila, Crazy Horse's own band. The Hunkpatila was an offshoot of They Even Fear His Horses agency band, and the chief had sincerely attempted to integrate his Northern kinsmen into the smooth running of reservation life. Since the death of Crazy Horse, Hunkpatila leadership devolved to his father's half-brother Little Hawk, whose loyalties to his nephew's memory deeply conflicted with the interest of Commission of Indian Affairs. The festering resentment against Little Big Man focused within the Hunkpatila. (after surrendering along with Crazy Horse, Little Big Man switched allegiance and is suspected of involvement in Crazy Horse's murder at Fort Robinson in Nebraska.)

At beginning of 1878, Little Hawk's and He Dog's Oglala tiyospaye left the agency to join the resistance by Sitting Bull in Canada. A few Brulés, led by Black Eagle, a Sans Arc band of Lakota, and the Miniconjou leader Roman Nose had resisted pressure to assimilate to the reservation bands. In all, some eighty lodges fled, including approximately twenty lodges of Miniconjou, fifty lodges of Oglala, and ten lodges of Brulés and Sans Arcs. Northern Oglala headmen Iron Crow, leader of a mixed Hunkpatila-Oyuhpe band, and White Twin, a Bad Face leader, fled about the eleventh. They traveled northwest, pausing to regroup at the staging camp near the junction of Elk Creek and the south fork of the Cheyenne River. The council of warriors nominated Little Hawk as the Pipe Owner for the projected flight and a Sun Dance was held to promote the spirit of solidarity. Sending ahead nine men and a woman to inform Sitting Bull of their march, the village pressed on. Little Hawk coordinated the journey well, skillfully eluding army patrols to slip over the Canadian line during March and reuniting with the November breakaways in a village estimated at 250 lodges by the Canadian authorities. Including the earlier departures, Sitting Bull's alliance had been strengthened by some 280 lodges in spring 1878, almost doubling its numbers.

For the next three years, the exiles sought to maintain their independence in Canada, but conditions deteriorated rapidly. The buffalo herds, which through the 1870s had contracted northward across Montana Territory, vanished under relentless pressure from the exiles, Canadian Indians and Métis, and American hide hunters.

A final series of surrenders followed as hungry Lakota bands capitulated at military posts along the upper Missouri and Yellowstone and Little Hawk surrendered at Fort Keogh with Big Road in September 1880.

In 1881 the interned Lakotas were transported to Standing Rock Agency and held pending transfer to their home agencies. One year later, 656 Northern Oglalas were released from custody and, under the leadership of Little Hawk, Big Road, He Dog, and Low Dog, transferred home to their kin at Pine Ridge. At the same time, 172 Northern Brulés led by Bull Dog were returned to the new Brulé agency at Rosebud.

Little Hawk participated at Lakota Delegation to Washington on 1888.

On January 6, 1891, after Wounded Knee Massacre, Little Hawk, Big Road, He Dog, Jack Red Cloud, and High Hawk had negotiated the terms of surrender. On January 24, he led a group with about twenty Indians that came to Pine River agency to surrender thirty-one guns, attended the order of General Miles civilians to disarm the Indians.

== Death ==
Little Hawk's last occurrence in the Pine Ridge census is for 1899: he presumably died late that year or early 1900..
