= American Horse =

Native American (Oglala Lakota) politician

- Wašíčuŋ Tȟašúŋke
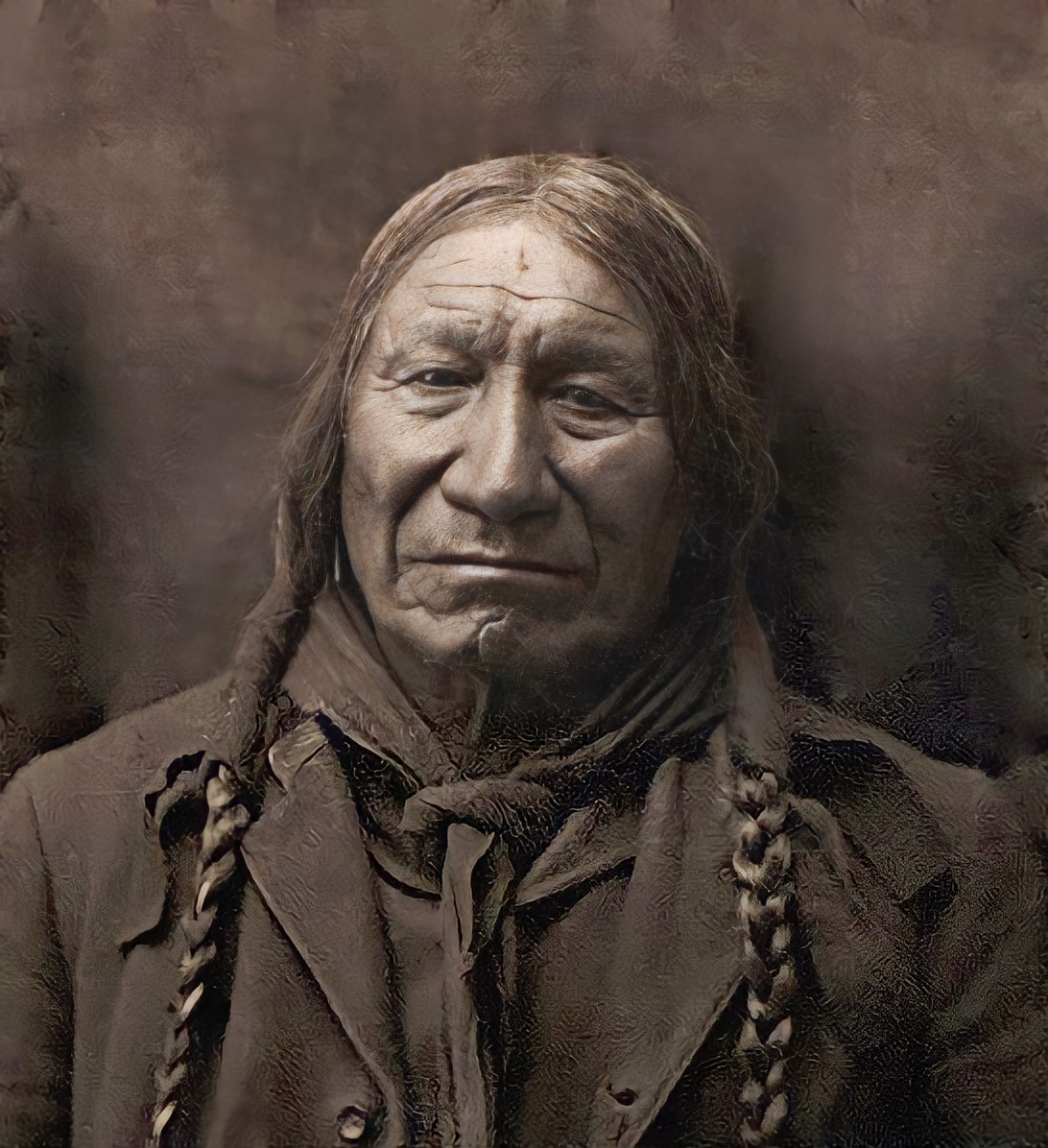
- American Horse ca 1905.

Oglala Lakota leader

Personal details
- Born: c. 1840 Black Hills, South Dakota, U.S.
- Died: December 16, 1908 (aged 67–68) Pine Ridge, South Dakota, U.S.
- Resting place: American Horse Area South of Kyle, SD. One Pine Ridge Indian Reservation
- Relations: Son-in-law of Red Cloud
- Parent(s): Father, Sitting Bear. Mother, Walks With.
- Nickname: Spider

American Horse (Lakota: Wašíčuŋ Tȟašúŋke; (Note: transl. He-Has-A-White-Man's-Horse) also known as American Horse the Younger; c. 1840 – December 16, 1908) was an Oglala Lakota chief, statesman, educator and historian. American Horse is notable in American history as a U.S. Army Indian Scout and a progressive Oglala Lakota leader who promoted friendly associations with European settlers and education for his people. American Horse opposed Crazy Horse during the Great Sioux War of 1876–1877 and the Ghost Dance Movement of 1890, and was a Lakota delegate to Washington. American Horse was one of the first Wild Westers with Buffalo Bill's Wild West and a supporter of the Carlisle Indian Industrial School. His record as a councilor of his people and his policy in the new situation that confronted them was consistent, and he was known for his eloquence.

== Early life ==
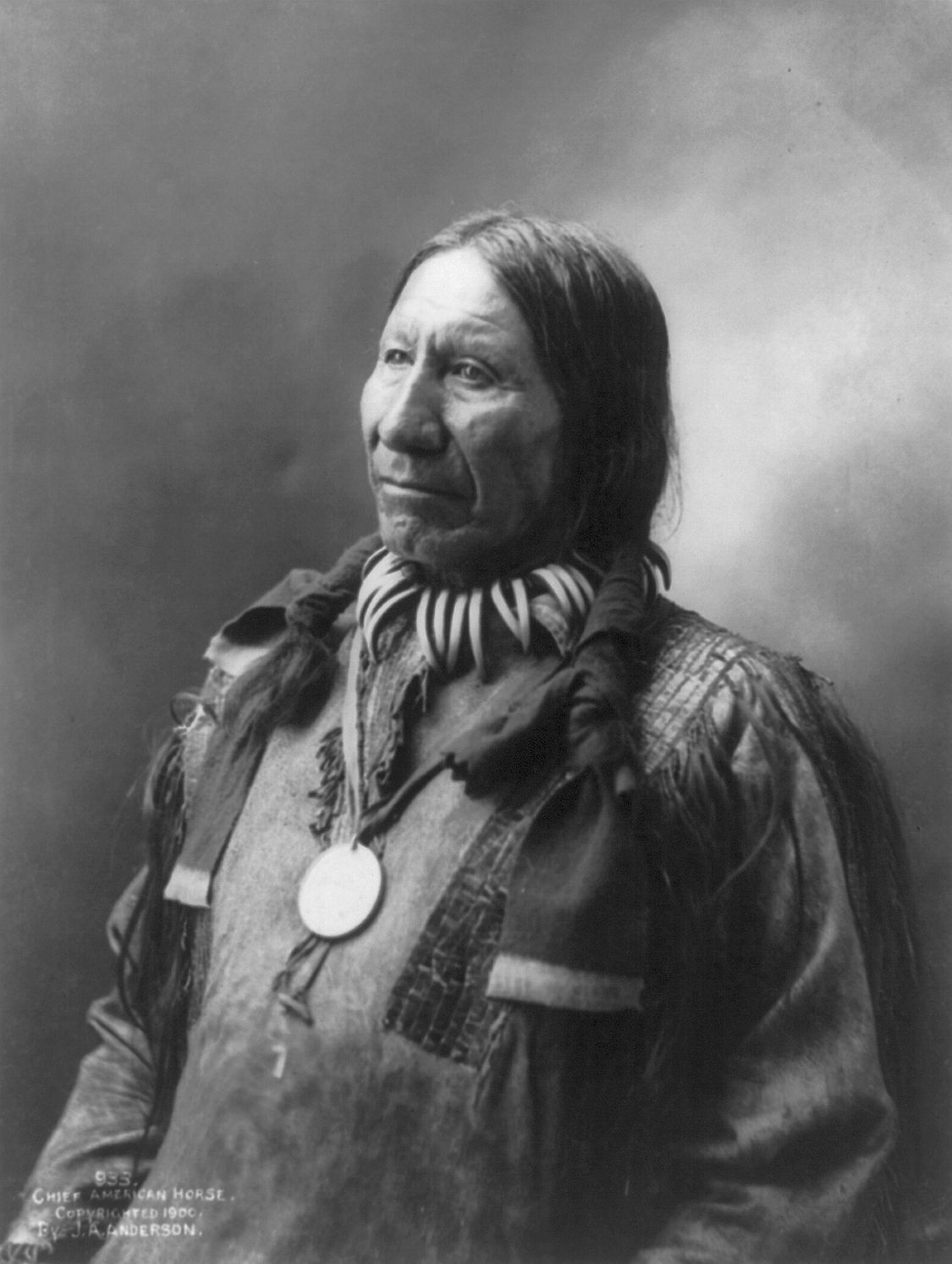

American Horse was first known as Manishnee (Cannot Walk, or Played Out) and his nickname was Spider. When he was born, his old grandfather said: 'Put him out in the sun! Let him ask his great-grandfather, the Sun, for the warm blood of a warrior!' And he had warm blood." His father Sitting-Bear, the leader of the True Oglalas, was killed in battle while he was still very young and he was raised by an uncle. As a youth, American Horse participated in war parties against the Crow and Shoshones.

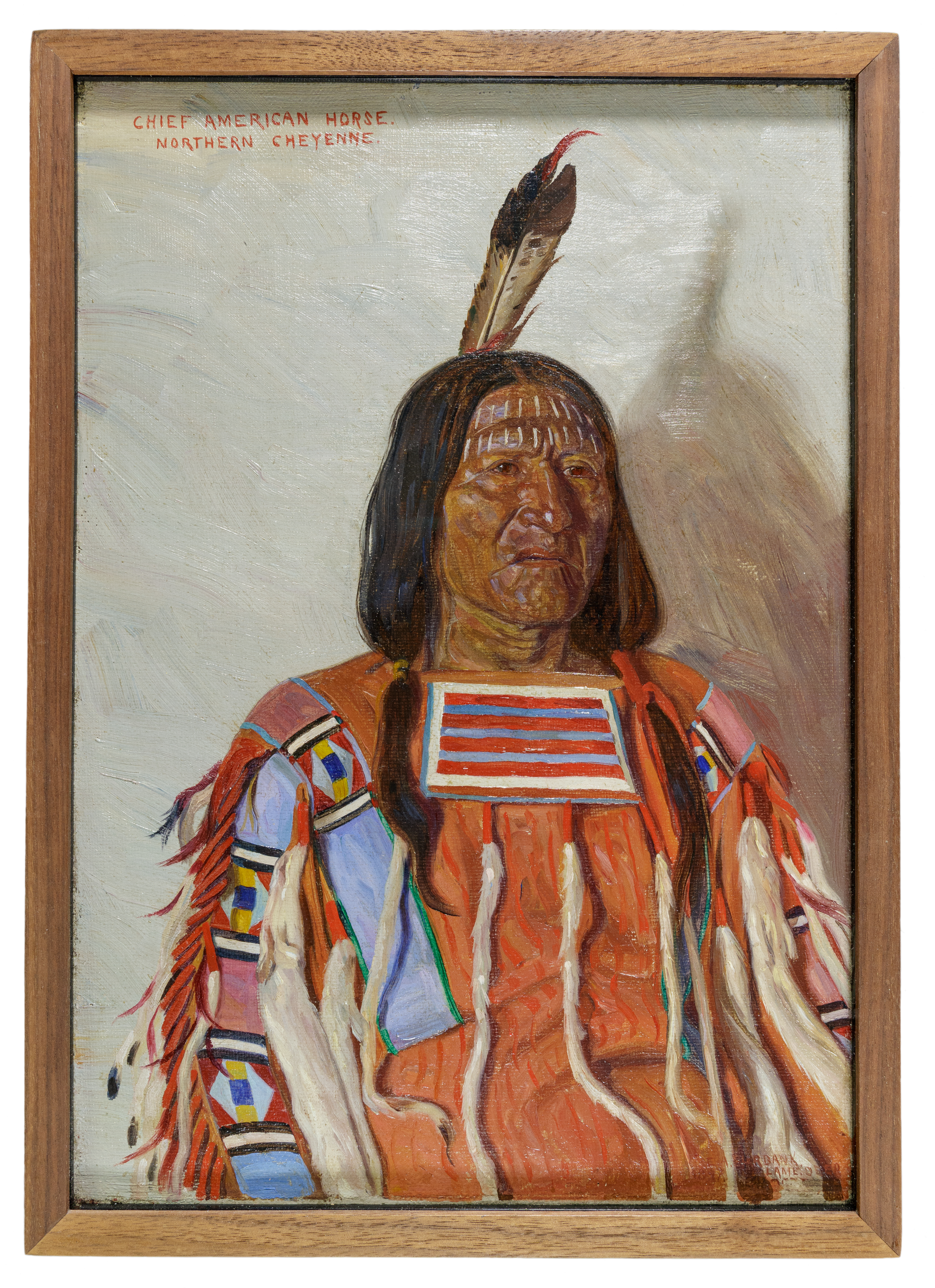
Oil painting on canvas of American Horse by Elbridge Ayer Burbank, 1897.

American Horse was ten years old when he was attacked by three Crow warriors, while driving a herd of ponies to water. Here he displayed native cunning and initiative. It seemed he had scarcely a chance to escape, for the enemy was near. He yelled frantically at the ponies to start them toward home, while he dropped off into a thicket of willows and hid there. A part of the herd was caught in sight of the camp and there was a counter chase, but the Crows got away with the ponies. Of course, his mother was frantic, believing her boy had been killed or captured. But after the excitement was over, he appeared in camp unhurt. When questioned about his escape, he remarked: "I knew they would not take the time to hunt for small game when there was so much bigger close by."

One day a small party of Shoshones was discovered near at hand. In the midst of the excitement and preparations for the attack, young American Horse caught sight of a close by, fat, black-tail deer. Unable to resist the temptation, he pulled an arrow from his quiver and sent it through the deer's heart. Then with several of his half-starved companions, sprang upon the yet quivering body of the animal to cut out the liver which was sometimes eaten raw. One of the men was allegedly knocked down by the last kick of the dying buck, but the warriors swallowed a few mouthfuls of liver before rushing upon and routing their enemies. It is still told of how American Horse killed game and feasted between the ambush and the attack.

== U.S. Army Indian Scout ==
In the early 1870s, American Horse moved to the Red Cloud Agency. He allied himself with the Wagluhe people at Fort Robinson and became a son-in-law to Chief Red Cloud. American Horse soon enlisted as a U.S. Army Indian Scout, and the military made much use of him keeping the young braves quiet and recruiting new scouts.

== Killing of Sioux Jim ==
On August 31, 1876, about a month after the Battle of the Little Big Horn, American Horse shot and killed Sioux Jim. Colonel Ranald S. Mackenzie, who had just arrived at Camp Robinson, received word that Sioux Jim was in the Wagluhe or Loafer village, led by Chief Blue Horse. Early that morning, Major Gordan led four companies of cavalry to the village, said to number about 50 lodges near the agency, to arrest Sioux Jim. Sioux Jim could not be found, but Gordan did capture Sioux Jim's wife and one of his sons, and they were taken back to Camp Robinson and placed in the guardhouse. Chief Blue Horse was arrested for a short time for not following Mackenzie's order to report northern "hostile" Indians slipping into his Waghule village. "Shortly after the troops left, Sioux Jim came back to the village where American Horse attempted to arrest him. In the process, American Horse shot and killed Sioux Jim. The date of Sioux Jim's death is from Mackenzie's reports to General Crook and General Sheridan, both dated Sept. 2, 1876."

== Adoption of the name American Horse ==
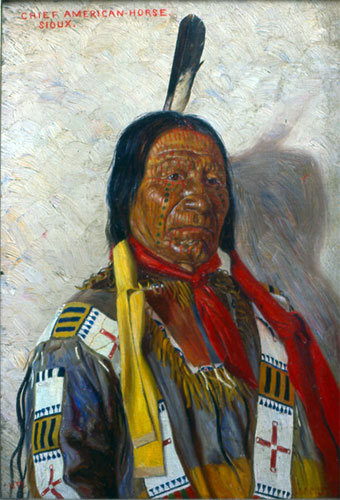
Painting of American Horse by Elbridge Ayer Burbank, 1899.

There are two Oglala Lakota chiefs named American Horse notable in American history. Historian George E. Hyde distinguished them by referring to "Chief American Horse the Elder" as the son of Old Chief Smoke and the cousin of Red Cloud, and "Chief American Horse the Younger" as the son of Sitting Bear, and son-in-law to Red Cloud.

Chief American Horse the Elder (Wašíčuŋ Tȟašúŋke; 1830 – September 9, 1876) is renowned as a great warrior for his leadership, Spartan courage and honor. American Horse the Elder is notable in American history as one of the principal war chiefs allied with Crazy Horse during Red Cloud's War and the Battle of the Little Bighorn during the Great Sioux War of 1876–1877. Chief American Horse the Elder was a son of Old Chief Smoke, an Oglala Lakota head chief and one of the last great Shirt Wearers, "Ogle Tanka Un", a highly prestigious Lakota "chief warrior" society. He was a signatory to the Fort Laramie Treaty of 1868, along with Chief Red Cloud and Chief Blue Horse, his brothers. A month or so after the Treaty of 1868, American Horse the Elder was chosen as a Shirt Wearer along with Crazy Horse, Young-Man-Afraid-of-His-Horses and Man That Owns a Sword. On September 9, 1876, American Horse the Elder was mortally wounded in the Battle of Slim Buttes fighting to protect his family and defending against the settler invasion of the "Paha Sapa" Black Hills.

American Horse the Younger gained influence during the turbulence of the Great Sioux War of 1876–1877. After news of the death of Chief American Horse the Elder at the Battle of Slim Buttes, Manishnee (Can not walk, or Played out) seized an opportunity and assumed the name "American Horse." American Horse the Younger was not related to American Horse the Elder, son of Old Chief Smoke. He was the son of Sitting Bear, leader of the True Oglalas, a band of Oglala opposed to the Smoke people In 1890, American Horse the Younger told Charles A. Eastman that he succeeded to the name and position of his uncle American Horse the Elder who was killed at Sim Buttes in 1876. Later, American Horse the Younger claimed that American Horse the Elder was not killed at Slim Buttes, but rather a minor chief Iron Plume or Iron Shield. He also claimed that he personally killed Captain William J. Fetterman with his war club in the Fetterman Fight during Red Cloud's War. As a result, the identities and accounts of American Horse the Elder and the American Horse the Younger have been blended by some historians. Like his great friend Crazy Horse, there are no known photographs or drawings of Chief American Horse the Elder.

== Murder of Crazy Horse ==
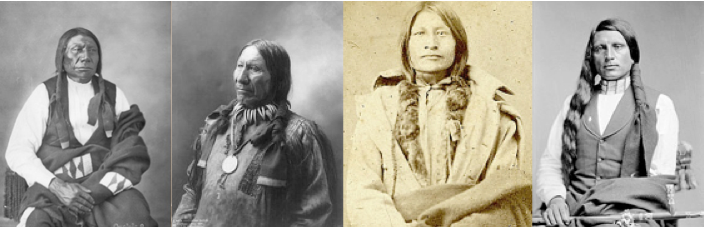
Wagluhe leaders after the Battle of the Little Big Horn: Left to right: Blue Horse, American Horse, Three Bears and Red Shirt. Wagluhe were considered by the U.S. Army and Indian agents to be the most progressive band of Lakota and many became Indian Police, U.S. Army Indian Scouts with the U.S. 4th Cavalry Regiment and intermediaries with other bands of Lakotas.

On May 6, 1877, Crazy Horse surrendered at Fort Robinson. For the next four months, Crazy Horse resided in his village near the Red Cloud Agency. American Horse and other Oglala leaders believed that Crazy Horse was a threat to order, and he made it fairly plain that he hated the settlers and he intended to attempt to return to his old wild life in the north at the first opportunity. Worried that further resistance would compromise peace negotiations to be held in Washington, D.C., Oglala leaders discussed how to "quiet" Crazy Horse and "bring him into a better state of feeling." But Crazy Horse refused to meet with them. Rumors of Crazy Horse's desire to slip away and return to the old ways of life started to spread at the Red Cloud and Spotted Tail agencies. Hearing that affairs at Red Cloud were nearing a crisis, Gen. Crook hurried to Fort Robinson. Crook believed that a personal interview with Crazy Horse would smooth the situation, and started for Crazy Horse's camp. However, he was stopped by Woman's Dress who bore a message from the agency chiefs warning Crook that Crazy Horse had stated his intention to kill him in the coming council if the general did not meet his demands. Crook was convinced that Crazy Horse meant what he said, and returned to Camp Robinson sending out a message for the chiefs to come there for the council. Crazy Horse ignored the summons. The chiefs told Gen. Crook that they did not approve of Crazy Horse's conduct and were ready to follow the general's lead. He told them they should prove their loyalty by arresting Crazy Horse. They then consulted and informed Crook that they were willing to act, but that Crazy Horse was a desperate man and some thought it would be better to kill him. Crook demurred, and said it would be murder. An agreement was finally reached whereby American Horse, Red Cloud, Little Wound, They Even Fear His Horses agreed to march with the soldiers with orders to arrest Crazy Horse.

On the morning of September 4, 1877, eight companies of the Third Cavalry and four hundred friendly Indians moved against Crazy Horse's village, only to find that it had scattered during the night. Crazy Horse had almost escaped alone, but soon turned to the nearby Spotted Tail Agency with his sick wife where he was arrested by agency Indians. On the morning of September 5, 1877, Crazy Horse and Lieutenant Jesse M. Lee, the Indian agent at Spotted Tail, departed for Fort Robinson. Arriving that evening, Lieutenant Lee was informed that he was to turn Crazy Horse over to Captain James Kennington, who accompanied Crazy Horse to the post guardhouse. Once inside, Crazy Horse struggled with the guard and Little Big Man and attempted to escape. Just outside the door, Crazy Horse was stabbed with a bayonet by one of the members of the guard. He was taken to the adjutant's office, where he was tended by the assistant post surgeon at the post, Dr. Valentine McGillycuddy, and died late that night.

== The Wagluhe ==
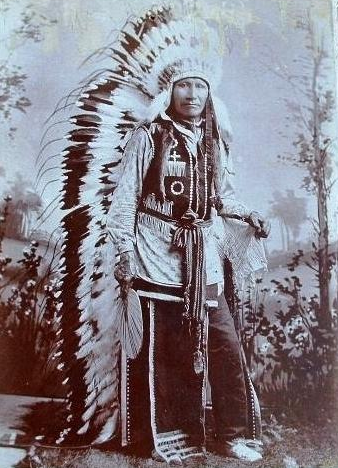
Chief American Horse was one of the first Wild Westers with Buffalo Bill Cody. In 1886, American Horse replaced Sitting Bull as the Indian headliner for the 1886–87 seasons.

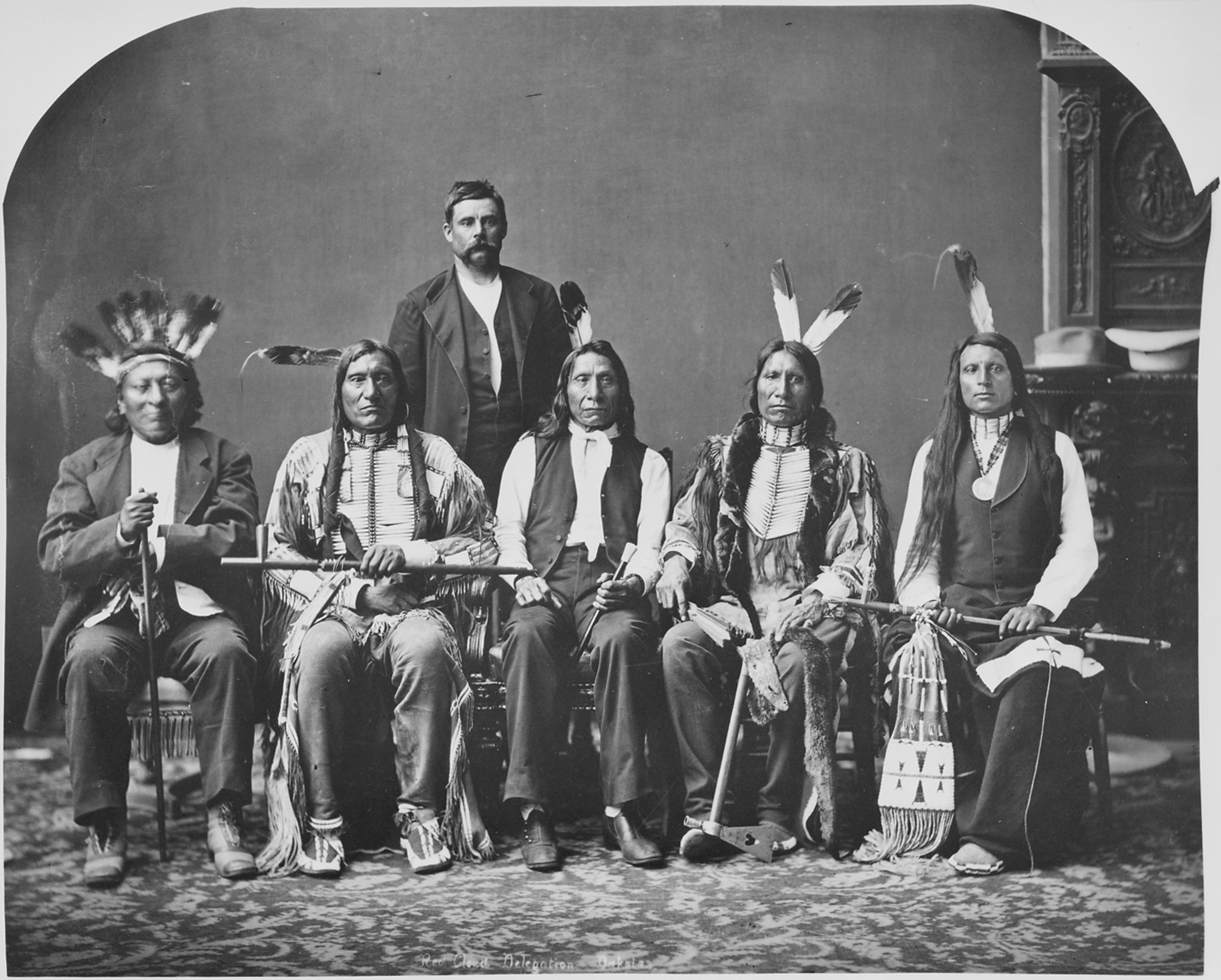
Dakota delegation to Washington, D.C., Left to right, Red Dog, Little Wound, John Bridgeman (interpreter), Red Cloud, American Horse and Red Shirt. June, 1880

The Wagluhe Band is one of the seven bands of the Oglala Lakota. The Wagluhe Band is also known as the Loafer Band. The seven Bands of the Oglala Lakota are the Wagluhe (Loafers), Ite Sica (Bad Face), Oyukpe (Broken Off), Wazaza (Shred Into Strips), Tapisleca (Split Liver), Payabaya (Shove Aside) and Kiyaksa (Little Wound). Old Chief Smoke was an Oglala Lakota head chief and one of the last great Shirt Wearers, a highly prestigious Lakota warrior society. The Smoke People were one of the most prominent Lakota families of the 18th and 19th centuries. Old Chief Smoke was one of the first Lakota chiefs to appreciate the power of the settlers and the need for association. In 1849, Old Chief Smoke moved his Wagluhe camp to Ft. Laramie, Wyoming when the U.S. Army first garrisoned the old trading post to protect and supply wagon trains of settler migrants along the Oregon Trail. Lakota families from other camps who preferred the safety of Ft. Laramie joined Smoke's camp. Old Chief Smoke was aware of the power of the settlers, their overwhelming numbers and the futility of war. Old Chief Smoke observed and learned the customs of the settlers. By the late 1850s, some Lakota from the wild buffalo-hunting camps began to disparage Old Chief Smoke's camp at Ft. Laramie and call Old Chief Smoke's community Wagluhe (Loafers), meaning they were like men who lived with their wives' relatives, that is, hangers-on, loafers. On the other hand, some Wagluhe thought of the Lakota in the wilds as county bumpkins. During the increasing strife of the 1860s, the Ft. Laramie took on a military posture and was the primary staging ground for the U.S. Army during Red Cloud's War. In 1864, Old Chief Smoke died and was placed on a scaffold near sight of his Ft. Laramie and replaced by Chief Big Mouth.

The Wagluhe were aware of the power of the settlers, their overwhelming numbers and the futility of war. Traditionally, in intertribal warfare, a fight among fifty warriors in which two men were killed was considered a big fight. The Wagluhe at Ft. Laramie heard of the 50,000 casualties of the three-day Battle at Gettysburg in July 1863, and knew what white men meant when they spoke of battle. The Wagluhe observed and learned the customs of the settlers. Wagluhe were considered by the U.S. Army and Indian agents to be the most progressive band of Lakota and many became Indian Police, U.S. Army Indian Scouts with the U.S. 4th Cavalry Regiment and intermediaries with other bands of Lakotas. The Wagluhe formed a civil administration at Ft. Laramie and Old Chief Smoke appointed Chief Blue Horse and Chief Big Mouth the first Indian Police officers. The U.S. Army concluded that, even if there were doubts about their reliability, the Wagluhe's role as scouts, civil administrators and mediators was absolutely essential. The Wagluhe were the first Oglala Lakota to send their children to the Carlisle Indian Industrial School in Carlisle, Pennsylvania, for a formal education, and the first to go Wild Westing with Col. "Buffalo Bill" Cody and his Wild West.

After the Battle of the Little Big Horn, and the arrest of Blue Horse, American Horse became the spokesman and leader of the progressive faction at Red Cloud agency and advocated cooperation in reform programs. American Horse was influential and energetic in the cause of the government. As American Horse emerged a leader, the Wagluhe split into three bands. Blue Horse remained head chief of one band, and American Horse and Three Bears led the other two. Red Shirt was also a popular leader and served as Three Bears' lieutenant. These leaders had much in common. Blue Horse, American Horse, Three Bears and Red Shirt all served as U.S. Army Indian Scouts with U.S. 4th Cavalry Regiment; were first Oglala Lakota to send their children to the Carlisle Indian Industrial School in Carlisle, Pennsylvania, for a formal education; all led Lakota delegations to Washington, D.C.; and went Wild Westing with Buffalo Bill's Wild West.

== Peace conferences in Washington ==
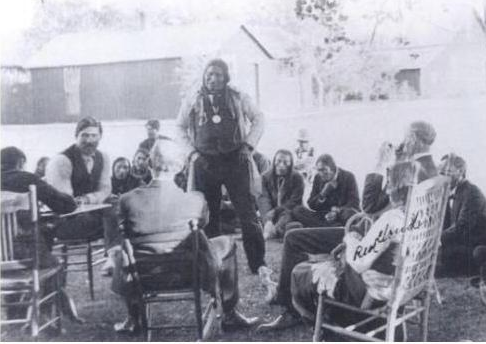
Oglala Tribal Council, Pine Ridge, South Dakota, 1903. American Horse standing in middle. Red Cloud sitting right.

Chief American Horse was a delegate to many peace conferences in Washington. During the tumultuous times from 1865 to 1877, American Horse advocated yielding to the government at any cost, being no doubt convinced of the uselessness of resistance. This quelled the people for the time being and up to the killing of Crazy Horse. In the crisis precipitated by this event, American Horse was again influential and energetic in the cause of the government. From this time on he became an active participant in the affairs of the Teton Sioux. He was always noted for his eloquence, which was nearly always conciliatory, yet he could say very sharp things of the duplicity of the settlers. He had much ease of manner and was a master of repartee. I recall his saying that "if you have got to wear golden slippers to enter the white man's heaven no Indian will ever get there, as the whites have got the Black Hills and with them all the gold." "His record as a councilor of his people and his policy in the new situation that confronted them was manly and consistent."

== Wild Westing ==
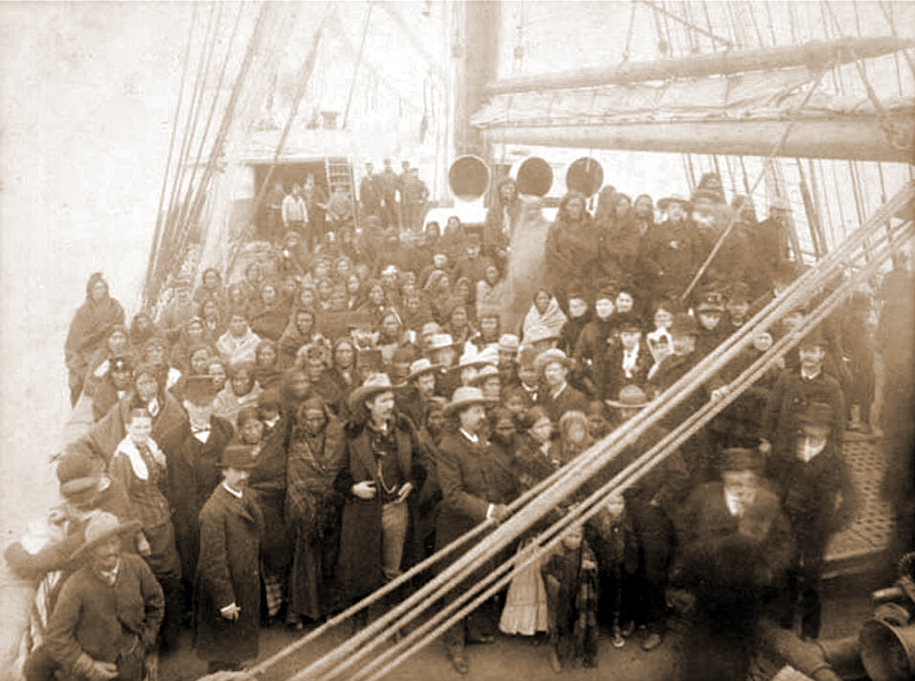
On March 31, 1887, Chief Blue Horse, Chief American Horse and Chief Red Shirt and their families boarded the S.S. State of Nebraska in New York City, and began a new journey for the Lakota people when they crossed the sea to England with Buffalo Bill to perform at the Golden Jubilee of Queen Victoria.

Wild Westing was very popular with the Lakota people and beneficial to their families and communities, and offered a path of opportunity and hope during time when people believed Native Americans were a vanishing race whose only hope for survival was rapid cultural transformation. Between 1887 and World War I, over 1,000 Native Americans went "Wild Westing" with Buffalo Bill's Wild West. Most Wild Westers were Oglala Lakota from Pine Ridge, South Dakota, the first Lakota people to go Wild Westing. During a time when the Bureau of Indian Affairs was intent on promoting Native assimilation, Col. Buffalo Bill Cody used his influence with U.S. government officials to secure Native American performers for his Wild West.

In 1886, American Horse replaced Sitting Bull as the Indian headliner for the 1886–87 seasons. A journalist asked American Horse what he thought of the East and he replied, "I see so much that is wonderful and strange that I feel a wish to go out in the forest and cover my head with a blanket, so that I can see no more and have a chance to think over what I have seen." On March 31, 1887, Chief American Horse, Chief Blue Horse and Chief Red Shirt and their families boarded the S.S. State of Nebraska in New York City, leading a new journey for the Lakota people when they crossed the sea to England on Buffalo Bill's first international to perform at the Golden Jubilee of Queen Victoria and tour through Birmingham, Salford and London over a five-month period. The entourage consisted of 97 Indians, 18 buffaloes, 2 deer, 10 elk, 10 mules, 5 Texas steers, 4 donkeys, and 108 horses.

Buffalo Bill treated Native American employees as equals with white cowboys. Wild Westers received good wages, transportation, housing, abundant food and gifts of clothing and cash from Buffalo Bill at the end of each season. Wild Westers were employed as performers, interpreters and recruiters. Men had money in their pockets and for their families on the reservation. Female performers were paid extra for infants and children and supplemented wages by making and selling Lakota crafts. Shows hired venerable elder male Indians to appear in the parades to ensure that young men acted with consideration and politeness when visiting host communities, and rules were self-policed by traditional Oglala Lakota chiefs and former U.S. Army Indian Scouts. Known as "Show Indians", Oglala Wild Westers referred to themselves as "Oskate Wicasa" or "Show Man", a title of great honor and respect. Since 1887, Wild Westing has been family tradition with several hundred Pine Ridge families, and the tradition of the Wild Wester community is not unlike the tradition of circus families and communities. American Horse's sons Ben American Horse and Samuel American Horse were Carlisle Wild Westers and interpreters.

== Carlisle Indian Industrial School ==
=== History ===
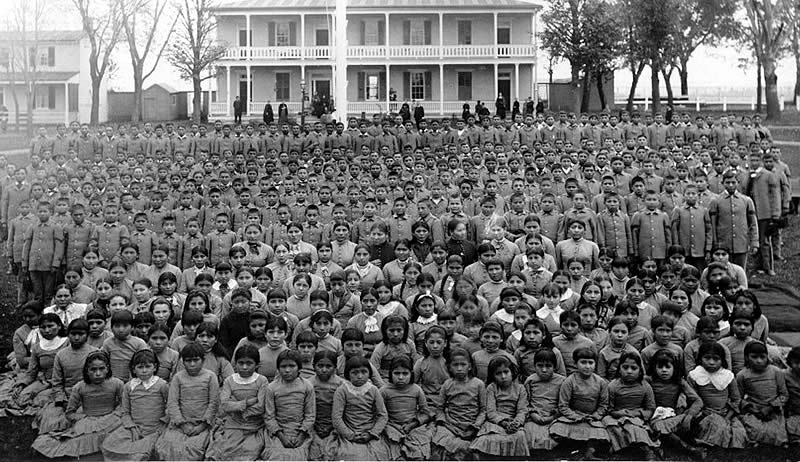
Children of Wagluhe leaders attended the first class at the Carlisle Indian Industrial School in Carlisle, PA in 1879.

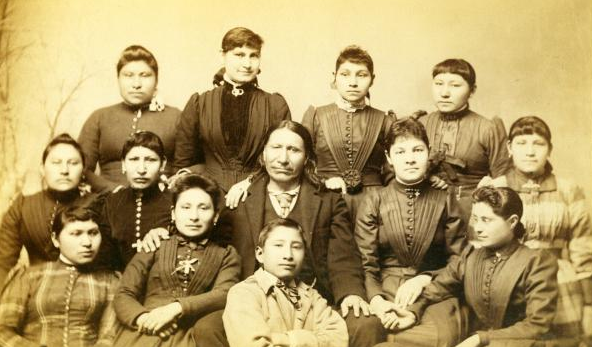
American Horse at Carlisle, 1882, with his daughter Maggie Stands Looking with other Indian students and teachers. Maggie Stands Looking was one of Captain Pratt's model students.

The Carlisle Indian Industrial School in Carlisle, Pennsylvania, was the model Indian boarding school in the United States from 1879 through 1918. Carlisle was the first Indian boarding school located far from the reservation, in an Eastern environment far from the influences and support of native cultures. At a time when many European Americans propagated the idea that Native Americans were a vanishing race whose only hope for survival was rapid cultural transformation, Carlisle offered a radical form of assimilation through "re-education." Carlisle was founded on principle that if whites could "Kill the Indian," they could "save the man." Native American children were taken (forcibly, in many cases, from their parents and home communities) and were trained to speak, act, and behave like whites, so that they could act as servants to European families. These Native American children were immersed in Euro-American culture and forbidden from expressing linguistic, cultural, spiritual or physical aspects of their Native culture while learning some academic, but primarily menial and trade skills. Through the years, Carlisle evolved from an industrial trade school to a preparatory school with unique endowments and faculty. Attending Carlisle was considered by some Native Americans like going to Yale, Princeton or Cambridge, and the family tradition of Carlisle alumni as "Harvard style" is one of pride and stories of opportunity and success. For many others, Carlisle was the foundation for personal cultural dispossession, familial separation, and loss of identity. Carlisle was a unique school and produced a new generation of Native American leadership. And for others, their family members were never to come home again. Reports of abuse and children dying under the school’s care have been investigated in recent years. Remains buried in Carlisle have also begun to be returned home to Native American lands.

=== Captain Pratt and American Horse ===
American Horse was one of the earliest advocates of education for the Indian, and his son Samuel and nephew Robert were among the first students at Carlisle. While recruiting at Pine Ridge, Captain Richard Henry Pratt met heavy opposition from Red Cloud who was distrustful of white education, and who had no school age children. But Pratt couldn't help noticing that American Horse "took a lively interest" in what he had to say. American Horse had grown into an influential tribal politician and was the head of a large household with two wives and at least ten children. He had become a sophisticated man who adroitly negotiated his way between the traditional Lakota society and the new white society encircling him. He had become a shrewd politician and his friendliness with whites was a calculation to win concessions for himself and his people. Above all, American Horse prided himself in his sagacity, It was glaringly apparent to him that his offspring would have to deal with whites, and perhaps even live with them, whether they liked it or not. American Horse agreed to send two sons and a daughter for first class: Ben American Horse, Samuel American Horse and Maggie Stands Looking. Charles A. Eastman recalled, "His daughters were the handsomest Indian girls of full blood that I ever saw."

=== Maggie Stands Looking ===
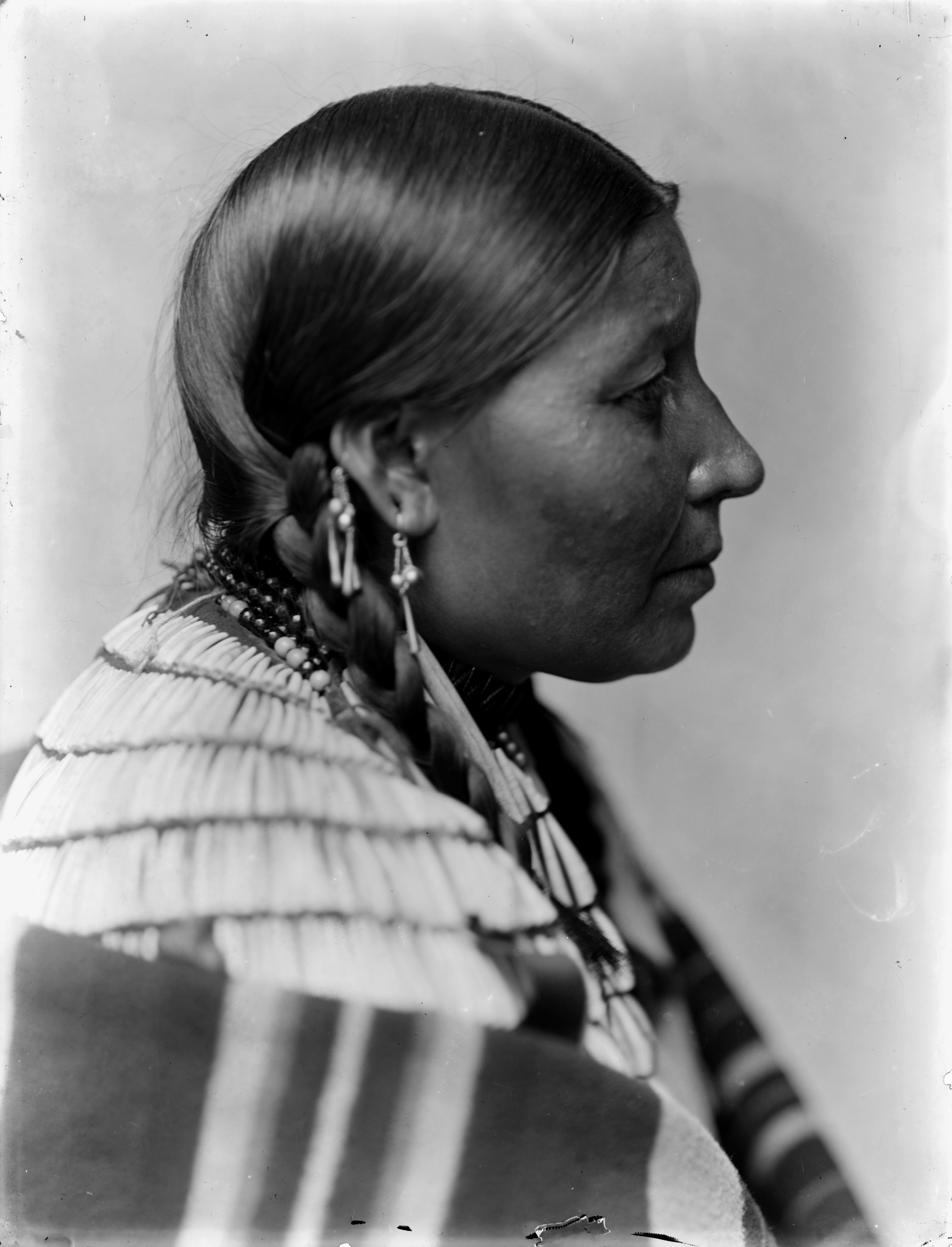
Wife of American Horse, Dakota Sioux, by Gertrude Käsebier, c.1900

Maggie Stands Looking was one of Captain Pratt's model students. Maggie dictated this letter to an interpreter for publication: "Carlisle Barracks, PA, Jan. 24, 1881. My dear father: AMERICAN HORSE:- I want to tell you something, and it makes me feel very glad. You tell me that my brother is married and that makes me feel very glad. My cousins, and brothers, and I are all very well, at this Carlisle School. We would like to see you again. I am always happy here, but lately I sometimes feel bad, because you tell me that my grandfather is getting very old. Tell me how my brothers are. I would like to see my brother's wife's picture. Tell my brother Two-Dogs to write to me again. Miss Hyde's father died two weeks ago, and I am very sorry. I remember all of my friends. If you don't answer my letter soon, I'll feel bad. I don't always answer your letter soon, but it is because I can not write. As soon as I get so that I can write myself, I will write as often as I can. Tell Brave Bull that Dora (Her Pipe) has been a little sick, but is most well now. Tell if my grandfather is well. If he gets sick tell me. You wrote to my cousin Robert and told him that you had a house to live in, and lots of pigs and cows and such things, and I was very glad. You've got a white man's house to live in now and I am anxious to learn all that I can, so that I can come home by and by and live with you. I hear that they have a big school out there and it makes me very glad. If you can, come again, and tell me if you can come again, when. I want to tell you that some more girls and boys came here. Twenty-five. Fifteen of them are girls. There are a great many of us here now, and Capt. Pratt is very kind to us. That is all I want to say now. Give my love to all of my friends. Your daughter, Maggie Stands-Looking."

Maggie Stands Looking was among the first wave of children brought from Rosebud. According to Pratt in his book, "Battlefield and Classroom," Maggie had difficulty adjusting to the demands of her new lifestyle at Carlisle. She once slapped Miss Hyde, the matron, when Hyde insisted that Maggie make her bed every day and keep her room clean. Instead of retaliating, Miss Hyde stood her ground and Maggie acquiesced. Like most of the Carlisle students, Maggie was enrolled in the Outing Program. Instead of returning the Indian children to their families during the summer months, the detribalizing process was continued by placing them for hire with non-Indian families. After her arrival to her country home, Maggie wrote this letter to the Superintendent:

"Dear Captain Pratt: What shall I do? I have been here two weeks and I have not bathe. These folks have no bath place. Your school daughter, MAGGIE STANDS LOOKING" Pratt advised her to do as he had done on the frontier ... [after] filling a wash basin with water and "rubbing myself well, have had a bath that made me feel as good as jumping into a river." He signed his letter – "Your friend and school father," R.H. Pratt.

=== Carlisle Wild Westers ===
Like Ben American Horse and Samuel American Horse, many Oglala Lakota Wild Westers from Pine Ridge Reservation, South Dakota attended Carlisle. Carlisle Wild Westers were attracted by the adventure, pay and opportunity and were hired as performers, chaperons, interpreters and recruiters. Wild Westers from Pine Ridge enrolled their children at the Carlisle Indian Industrial School from its beginning in 1879 until its closure in 1918. In 1879, Oglala Lakota leaders Chief Blue Horse, Chief American Horse and Chief Red Shirt enrolled their children in the first class at Carlisle. They wanted their children to learn English, trade skills, and white customs. "Those first Sioux children who came to Carlisle could not have been happy there. But it was their only chance for a future." Luther Standing Bear was taught to be brave and unafraid to die, and left the reservation to attend Carlisle and do some brave deed to bring honor to his family. Standing Bear's father celebrated his son's brave act by inviting his friends to a gathering and gave away seven horses and all the goods in his dry goods store.

== Opposed Ghost Dancers ==
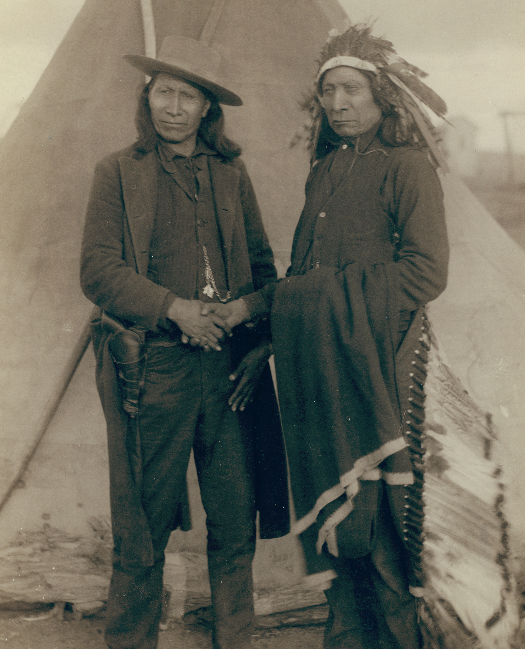
American Horse, left, Red Cloud, right, 1891. American Horse was a son-in-law of Red Cloud.

"It was during the last struggle of his people, at the time of the Messiah craze in 1890–1891 that American Horse demonstrated as never before the real greatness of the man. While many of his friends were carried away by the new thought, he held aloof from it and cautioned his band to do the same. When it developed into an extensive upheaval among the nations he took his positive stand against it. Presently all Indians who did not dance the Ghost Dance were ordered to come into camp at Pine Ridge Agency. American Horse was the first to bring in his people. I was there at the time and talked with him daily. When Little was arrested, it had been agreed among the disaffected to have him resist, which meant that he would be roughly handled. This was to be their excuse to attack the Indian police, which would probably lead to a general massacre or outbreak. I know that this desperate move was opposed from the beginning by American Horse, and it was believed that his life was threatened."

"On the day of the "Big Issue", when thousands of Indians were gathered at the agency, this man Little, who had been in hiding, walked boldly among them. Of course the police would arrest him at sight, and he was led toward the guardhouse. He struggled with them, but was overpowered. A crowd of warriors rushed to his rescue, and there was confusion and a general shout of "Hurry up with them! Kill them all!" I saw American Horse walk out of the agent's office and calmly face the excited mob. "What are you going to do?" he asked. "Stop, men, stop and think before you act! Will you murder your children, your women, yes, destroy your nation to-day?" He stood before them like a statue and the men who held the two policemen helpless paused for an instant. He went on: "You are brave today because you outnumber the white men, but what will you do tomorrow? There are railroads on all sides of you. The soldiers will pour in from every direction by thousands and surround you. You have little food or ammunition. It will be the end of your people. Stop, I say, stop now!" Jack Red Cloud, son of the old chief rushed up to him and thrust a revolver almost in his face. "It is you and men like you," he shouted, "who have reduced our race to slavery and starvation!" American Horse did not flinch but deliberately reentered the office, followed by Jack still flourishing the pistol. But his timely appearance and eloquence had saved the day. Others of the police force had time to reach the spot, and with a large crowd of friendly Indians had taken command of the situation. When I went into the office I found him alone but apparently quite calm. "Where are the agent and the clerks?" I asked. "They fled by the back door," he replied, smiling. "I think they are in the cellar. These fools outside had almost caught us asleep, but I think it is over now."

== Inaugural Parade of Theodore Roosevelt 1905 ==
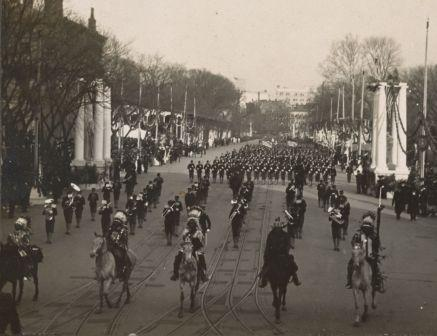
Inaugural Parade of Theodore Roosevelt, March 4, 1905. Six Native American chiefs on horseback adorned with face paint and headdresses, followed by the 46-piece Carlisle Indian School Band and a brigade of 350 Carlisle Cadets at arms attended the parade.

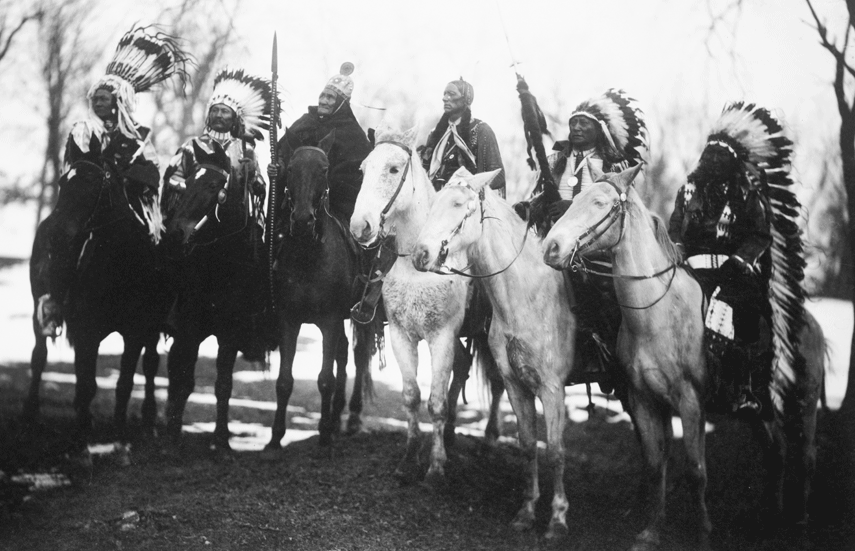
Six tribal leaders (l to r) Little Plume (Piegan), Buckskin Charley (Ute), Geronimo (Chiricahua Apache), Quanah Parker (Comanche), Hollow Horn Bear (Brulé Sioux), and American Horse (Oglala Sioux) on horseback in ceremonial attire.

On March 4, 1905, Wild Westers and Carlisle portrayed contrasting images of Native Americans at the First Inaugural Parade of Theodore Roosevelt. Six famous Native American Chiefs, Geronimo (Apache), Quanah Parker (Comanche), Buckskin Charlie (Ute), American Horse (Sioux), Hollow Horn Bear (Sioux) and Little Plume (Blackfeet), met in Carlisle, Pennsylvania, to rehearse the parade with the Carlisle Cadets and Band. Theodore Roosevelt sat in the presidential box with his wife, daughter and other distinguished guests, and watched West Point cadets and the famed 7th Cavalry, Gen. George A. Custer's former unit that fought at the Battle of Little Bighorn, march down Pennsylvania Avenue. When the contingent of Wild Westers and the Carlisle Cadets and Band came into view, President Roosevelt vigorously waived his hat and all in the President's box rose to their feet to behold the powerful imagery of the six famous Native American Chiefs on horseback adorned with face paint and elaborate feather headdresses, followed by the 46-piece Carlisle Indian School Band and a brigade of 350 Carlisle Cadets at arms. Leading the group was Geronimo, in full Apache regalia including war paint, sitting astride his horse, also in war paint, in the center of the street. It was reported that: "The Chiefs created a sensation, eclipsing the intended symbolism of a formation of 350 uniformed Carlisle students led by a marching band," and "all eyes were on the six chiefs, the cadets received passing mention in the newspapers and nobody bothered to photograph them."

== Major Israel McCreight ==
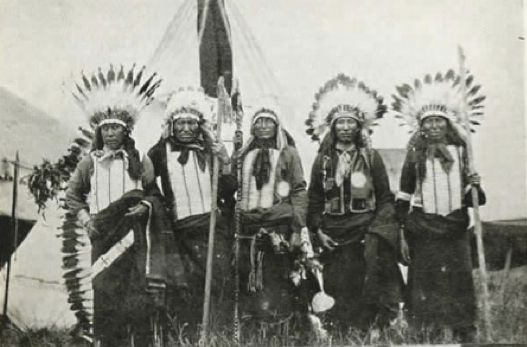
From left to right: Oglala Lakota chiefs Lone Bear, American Horse, Iron Tail, Iron Cloud and Whirlwind. Du Bois, PA., June 22, 1908.

Chief American Horse was always a welcome guest at The Wigwam: Major Israel McCreight's home in Du Bois, Pennsylvania. The Wigwam was a retreat for Progressive Era politicians, businessmen, journalists and adventurers; the Eastern home of Oglala Lakota "Oskate Wicasa"; Chief Flying Hawk's second home for 30 years and a Native American heritage center. Accordingly, Du Bois, known principally as a northcentral railroad hub on the Eastern Continental Divide, was always a welcome rest stop for weary travelers. The Wigwam held cultural significance to Native Americans, being a place where cultural practices were readily accepted and common. On one occasion 150 Indians with Buffalo Bill's Wild West camped in the forests of The Wigwam. Chiefs American Horse, Blue Horse, Jim Grass, Whirlwind Horse, Turkey Legs, Lone Bear, Iron Cloud, Bear Dog, Yellow Boy, Rain-In-The-Face, Hollow Horn Bear, Kills-Close-To-Lodge, Red Eagle, Good Face (Eta Waste), Benjamin Brave (Ohitika) and Thunder Bull visited The Wigwam. Legendary Crow Chiefs Plenty Coups and Crow Dog were also welcome visitors. On June 22, 1908, McCreight was adopted as an honorary Chief of the Oglala Lakota people and named "Cante Tanke ("Great Heart"). On that occasion, Col. William "Buffalo Bill" Cody was in Du Bois, Pennsylvania, with Wild West Congress of Rough Riders. Twelve thousand people a day attended Cody's Wild West performances and 150 Oglalas were in town with 150 ponies. The ceremony was performed by Chief Iron Tail assembled at Buffalo Bill's tent and attended by Chief American Horse, Chief Lone Bear, Chief Whirlwind Horse, and 100 Oglala Lakota Wild Westers.

== American Horse winter count ==
Chief American Horse was a Lakota historian and authored a "winter count" he kept on a piece of cloth covering over one hundred years of Lakota history, 1775–1878. Lakota years are conceived as extending from the first snow of a winter to the first snow of the next winter. Years are given names based upon a significant or unique event that would be easy to recall. For example, Chief Flying Hawk's Winter Count for 1866 records the Fetterman Incident during Red Cloud's War as "Wasicu opawinge wica ktepi" or "They killed one hundred white men." Likewise, 1876 is "Marpiya llute sunkipi" or "They took horses from Red Cloud" (the U.S. Army did after the Battle of the Little Big Horn), 1877 is "Tasunka witko ktepi" or "When they killed Crazy Horse" and 1890 is "Si-tanka ktepi" or "When they killed Big Foot" (the Wounded Knee Massacre). In 1879, American Horse drew the winter count in a sketchbook at the request of William H. Corbusier, an Army surgeon. Corbusier sent it to the Smithsonian together with an explanation of the years provided by the keeper. American Horse said that the winter count had been kept in his family for generations, passed down from his grandfather, to his father, to him. American Horse was born in the year they stole many horses from the Flatheads, or 1840–41. His death is marked in the No Ears calendar for the year 1908–09.

== Final years ==
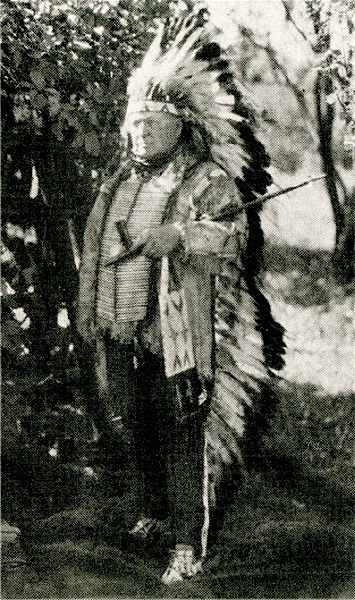
The Wigwam in Du Bois, Pennsylvania, was the home of Major Israel McCreight, Cante Tanke "Great Heart", and the Eastern home of Oglala Lakota "Oskate Wicasa."

Chief American Horse died from natural causes in his house near Kyle, Pine Ridge, South Dakota on December 16, 1908.

== Cited sources ==
- Boorn, Alida S. (2005). Oskate Wicasa (One Who Performs). Department of History, Central Missouri State University.
- Eastman, Charles A. (1918). Indian Heroes and Great Chieftains. Boston: Little, Brown, and Company.
- Hyde, George (1937). Red Cloud's Folk: A History of the Oglala Sioux Indians. Norman: University of Oklahoma Press. ISBN 9780806115207.
- Ostler, Jeffery (2004). The Plains Sioux and U.S. Colonialism from Lewis and Clark to Wounded Knee. Cambridge University Press. ISBN 0521605903.
- Moses, L. G. (1996). Wild West Shows and the Images of American Indians 1883-1933. University of New Mexico Press. ISBN 0826316859.
- Pratt, Richard Henry (1964). Utley, Robert M. (ed.). Battlefield & Classroom: An Autobiography by Richard Henry Pratt.
- Witmer, Linda F. (2002). The Indian Industrial School: Carlisle, Pennsylvania 1879–1918. Cumberland County Historical Society. ISBN 0-9638923-0-4.
