= Camp Sheridan =

Camp Sheridan may refer to:

- Camp Sheridan (Alabama), a WWI-era post in Alabama
- Camp Sheridan (Nebraska), a post established in northwestern Nebraska
- Camp Sheridan (Wyoming), the original name of Fort Yellowstone.
