= Short Bull =

Short Bull may refer to:

- Arnold Short Bull (c. 1845 -1915), Sicangu Lakota (or Brulé) leader, associated with Ghost Dance
- Grant Short Bull (c. 1852 -1935), Oglala Lakota leader
- A fictional US tank from Panzer Front.
