= Grant Short Bull =

Oglala Lakota headman (c. 1851 – 1935)

- Tȟatȟáŋka Ptéčela
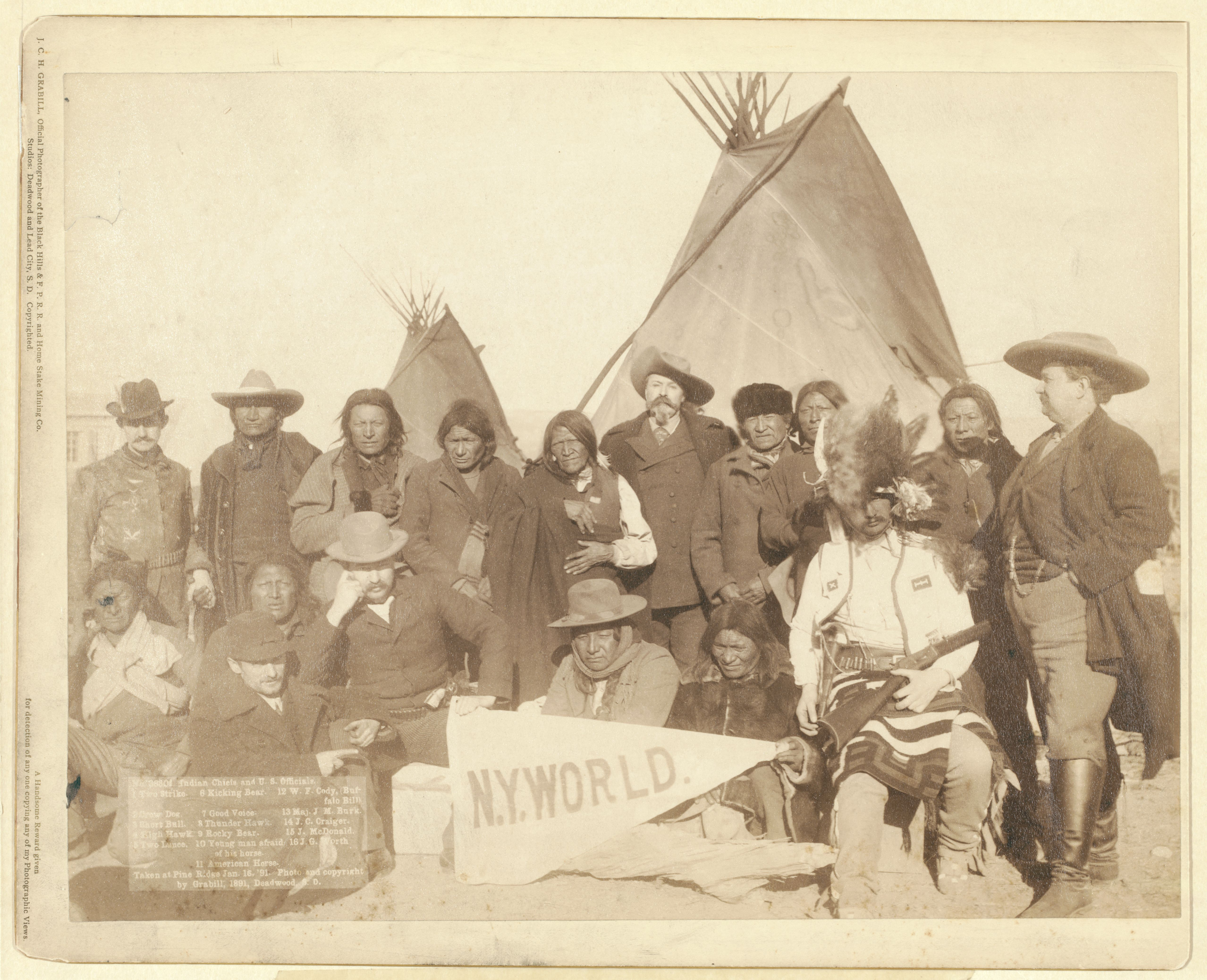
- Short Bull (top row, 4th from left) at meeting with US officials, Pine Ridge Reservation, 1891

Soreback Band, Oglala Lakota leader

Personal details
- Born: c. 1851
- Died: August 20, 1935 (aged 83–84)
- Spouse: Good Hawk (later known as Matilda or Nellie Short Bull)
- Children: Charlie Short Bull (born 1884); Katie (born 1893–1895)
- Parent(s): Black Rock and Scatter the Feather
- Known for: Participant in the Battle of the Little Bighorn

Grant Short Bull (Lakota: Tȟatȟáŋka Ptéčela; c. 1851 – 1935) was a member of Soreback Band, Oglala Lakota, and a participant in the Battle of the Little Bighorn. He became a headman during the early twentieth century on the Pine Ridge Indian Reservation.

== Early life ==
Born about 1851-52 near Fort Laramie, Short Bull was the son of a minor Oglala headman named Black Rock and his wife Scatter the Feather. Short Bull was the younger brother of the prominent Oglala He Dog. A member of the family band called the Cankahuhan or Soreback Band (Oglala), Short Bull was among those who remained away from the agencies in an attempt to enjoy the traditional life for as long as possible.

== Great Sioux War of 1876-77 ==
Short Bull was with the Soreback band on the Tongue River in January 1876 when the government's ultimatum was delivered to the northern bands. Short Bull later recalled that they agreed they would go in to the Red Cloud Agency, located in northwestern Nebraska. The Sorebacks soon joined a village of Northern Cheyenne on the Powder River. While Short Bull was absent from the village on a raiding party, the village was attacked by General George Crook's troops, under the direct command of Colonel Joseph J. Reynolds. Short Bull returned in time to help recapture part of the village's horse herd. "This attack was the turning point of the situation," Short Bull explained. "If it had not been for that attack by Crook on Powder River, we would have come in to the agency that spring, and there would have been no Sioux war."

Short Bull participated in both the Rosebud and Little Bighorn battles.

The Soreback Band, including Short Bull and He Dog, surrendered with Crazy Horse at the Red Cloud Agency on May 6, 1877. Short Bull served in Company A Indian scouts that fall, but then left with the other northern bands when they fled the agency. These families cross the border into Canada to join Sitting Bull where they remained for the next three years. Short Bull surrendered with other Oglala at Fort Keogh in 1880-81 and was transferred to the Standing Rock Agency in the summer of 1881. He and other members of the Soreback band were transferred to the Pine Ridge Reservation in May 1882 where they all settled on the forks of the White River.

== Short Bull's Family ==
Short Bull married Good Hawk about 1875. During the early reservation period, she became known as Matilda or Nellie Short Bull; he became known as Grant Short Bull. They had two grown children: Charlie Short Bull, born in 1884, and Katie, born about 1893-95. She later married Arthur Blue Horse Owner.

== Final years ==
Short Bull lived the remainder of his life on the Pine Ridge Reservation where he and his wife received an allotment. He and his wife were remarried in the Presbyterian Church Dec. 28, 1911. Matilda died on May 20, 1925. Grant made regular visits to the Agate Ranch in northwestern Nebraska, home of the frontiersman James Cook. Short Bull was among the elder Oglala who attended the dedication of the Crazy Horse marker at Fort Robinson in 1934.

Tragically, Grant Short Bull and his son Charlie were killed in an automobile accident north of Oglala, South Dakota, on August 20, 1935. The family was en route to a memorial dinner for Henry Young Skunk. With that single tragedy, much of the family oral history was lost. His daughter Kate Blue Horse Owner was also injured in the accident. She and her husband Arthur Blue Horse Owner subsequently took in Charlie's children, Eugene and Kerman.

Artist Arthur Short Bull is a great-grandson of Grant Short Bull.

== For Additional Information ==
- Dickson, Ephriam (2006). "Reconstructing the Indian Village on the Little Bighorn: The Cankahuhan or Soreback Band, Oglala". Greasy Grass. 22 (1): 2–14.
