= Encouraging Bear =

Lakota medicine man

Encouraging Bear, also known as Horn Chips (Lakota: Ptehé Wóptuȟ’a), was a noted Oglala Lakota medicine man, and the spiritual advisor to Crazy Horse, a Lakota war leader of the Oglala band in the 19th century.

Horn Chips was born in 1824 near Ft. Teton. He was orphaned as a young child and raised by his grandmother. Later he was adopted by the uncle of Crazy Horse.

Chips and Crazy Horse were raised together. He is said to have had the gift of prophecy, being able to change the weather, and find lost objects and missing people. He is also acknowledged as the man who saved traditional Lakota religion from extinction and trained a number of successors.

Chips was present when Crazy Horse was killed. When the soldier jerked the bayonet from Crazy Horse's body, he hit Chips in the shoulder with the butt and dislocated his shoulder. Chips buried Crazy Horse, and he was the only person who knew the body's location.

Horn Chips contributed to the popularity of a Lakota healing ceremony called yuwipi.

He was interviewed about Crazy Horse in 1907. Chips, who had a wife and four children, reportedly renounced his faith for Catholicism shortly before his death in 1913 or 1916.
