= Black Shawl =

Wife of Crazy Horse

- Tȟašína Sápa Wiŋ

Oglala Lakota leader

Personal details
- Born: United States
- Died: 1927 United States
- Spouse: Crazy Horse
- Relations: Spotted Tail, sister, Red Feather
- Children: They Are Afraid of Her

Black Shawl or Tasina Sapewin (Lakota: Tȟašína Sápa Wiŋ, lit. 'Black-Blanket-Woman') was the wife of Crazy Horse, whom she married in 1871. She was Crazy Horse's second wife. She was a member of the Oglala Lakota and relative of Spotted Tail. She was the sister of Red Feather.

The elders sent Black Shawl to heal Crazy Horse after his altercation with No Water. She was known at the time as having skill in treating bullet wounds.

Black Shawl was presented to Crazy Horse as a potential bride when she was twenty-four, which was considered late for a betrothal. Crazy Horse was twenty-eight when marriage was discussed between the two families.

She had a daughter in 1871, named They Are Afraid of Her. They Are Afraid of Her died at age three, likely of cholera. Black Shawl also developed the same disease, and was treated by Dr. Valentine McGillycuddy.

Crazy Horse's relationship with Black Shawl lasted longer than the other two romantic relationships that he had in his life. They were known to be "sociable in the tipi", indicating a contented home life, and she supported his life as a warrior.

Black Shawl died during a seasonal influenza outbreak in 1927.

== Movies ==
Suzan Ball played Black Shawl in the 1955 film Chief Crazy Horse.
