= Crazy Horse Memorial Highway =

Crazy Horse Memorial Highway is the name given to two highways named in honor of Crazy Horse (circa 1850–1877), a Lakota war leader:

- A portion of U.S. Route 16/U.S. Route 385 in South Dakota
- A portion of U.S. Route 20 in Nebraska
