= Little Big Man =

Lakota war leader

- Charging Bear
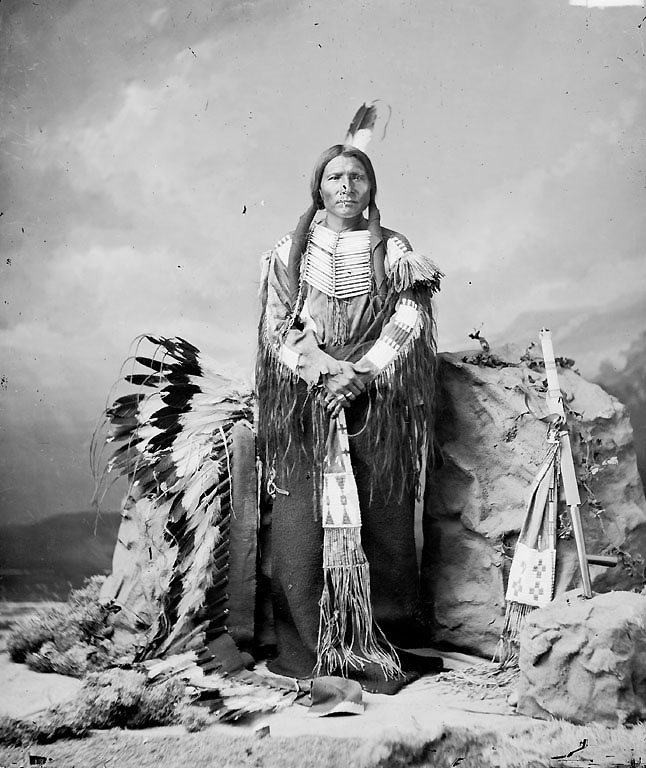
- Little Big Man

Oglala Lakota leader

Personal details
- Died: 1887 (exact date unknown)
- Resting place: Holy Cross Cemetery, Pine Ridge, South Dakota
- Relations: Sister (twin), Hannah Mule Tocha Cesli, born 1841
- Parent(s): Yellow Thunder, Her Holy Breath
- Known for: Battle of Little Bighorn, cousin and ally of Crazy Horse

Little Big Man (Lakota: Wičháša Tȟáŋkala), or Charging Bear, was an Oglala Lakota, or Oglala Sioux, who was a warrior who fought under, and was distant cousin to, Crazy Horse ("His-Horse-Is-Crazy"). He opposed the 1868 Treaty of Fort Laramie and fought against efforts by the United States to take control of the ancestral Sioux lands in the Black Hills area of the Dakota Territory. He also fought at the Battle of Little Big Horn in the Montana Territory in 1876. Later he decided to cooperate with the U.S. and may have been involved in the death of his old ally and rival, Crazy Horse, at Fort Robinson in Nebraska in 1877.

== Details ==
Little Big Man was Crazy Horse's lieutenant and threatened to kill the U.S. government commissioners negotiating with the Sioux for control of the Black Hills in 1875. He surrendered along with Crazy Horse in the late 1870s.

Little Big Man grabbed Crazy Horse's arm just before Crazy Horse was bayoneted by an army soldier. Crazy Horse's last words, uttered to Little Big Man and others after he was bayoneted by the soldier, were "Let me go, my friends. You have got me hurt enough."

== See also ==
- Little Big Man (unrelated 1970 film)
