= Camp Sheridan (Nebraska) =

- Camp Sheridan and Spotted Tail Indian Agency
- U.S. National Register of Historic Places
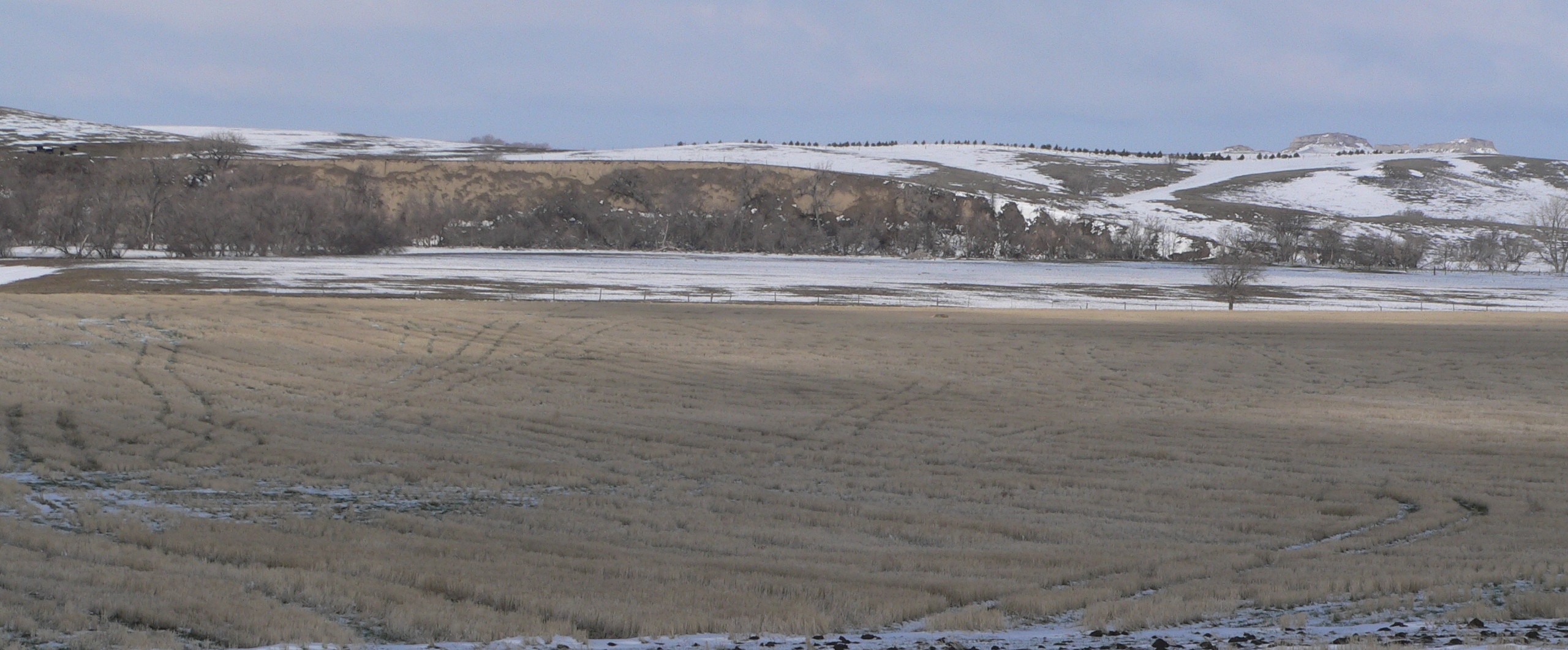
- Camp Sheridan site, seen from the east

- Location within Nebraska Location within the United States
- Location: Sheridan County, Nebraska, USA
- Nearest city: Hay Springs, NE
- Coordinates: 42°51′7.13″N 102°44′39.16″W
- Built: 1873
- NRHP reference No.: 74001140
- Added to NRHP: November 19, 1974

Camp Sheridan was established originally as the Post at Spotted Tail Indian Agency, near the Spotted Tail Agency in northwestern Nebraska in March 1874. In 1875, the garrison moved into permanent structures on the west fork of Beaver Creek, 12 miles upstream from the White River, near Hay Springs, Nebraska. The garrison, sometimes called Fort Sheridan, was abandoned seven years later in May 1881.

== See also ==
- Crazy Horse
