= He Dog =

Lakota leader (c.1840–1936)

- Šúŋka Bloká
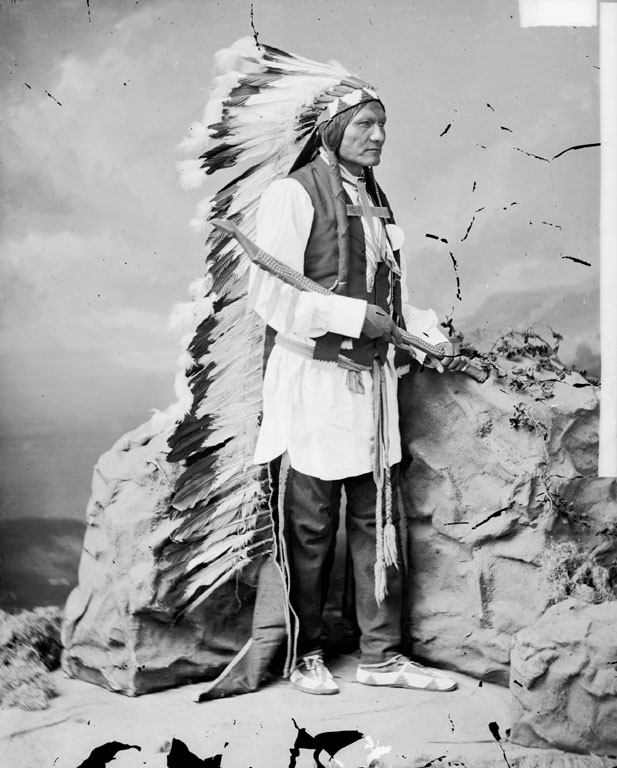
- Portrait by Charles M. Bell, taken in Washington, D.C., Oct. 1877.

Oglala, Lakota leader

Personal details
- Born: c. 1840
- Died: Feb 17, 1936 (aged 95-96) Pine Ridge Indian Reservation, South Dakota, United States

He Dog (Lakota: Šúŋka Bloká) (ca. 1840–1936), a member of the Oglala Lakota, was closely associated with Crazy Horse during the Great Sioux War of 1876-77.

== Biography ==
Born in the spring of 1840 on the headwaters of the Cheyenne River near the Black Hills, He Dog was the son of a headman named Black Stone and his wife, Blue Day, a sister of Red Cloud. His youngest brother was Grant Short Bull. By the 1860s, He Dog and his brothers had formed a small Oglala Lakota band known as the Cankahuhan or Soreback Band which was closely associated with Red Cloud's Bad Face band of Oglala.

He Dog and his relatives participated in the Great Sioux War of 1876–77. After the treaty commission failed to persuade the Lakota to give up the Black Hills, the President had an ultimatum sent in January 1876 to the northern bands to come into the agencies or be forced in by the army. He Dog was encamped with the Soreback band on the Tongue River when the message was delivered. He Dog's brother, Short Bull, later recalled that the majority of the northern Oglala resolved to head in to the Red Cloud Agency in the spring, after their last big buffalo hunt. In March 1876, He Dog married a young woman named Rock (Inyan) and with part of the Soreback Band, stopped briefly with the Northern Cheyenne encamped on the Powder River in Wyoming Territory. On the morning of March 17, 1876, a column of troops under Colonel Joseph J. Reynolds attacked. "This attack was the turning point of the situation," Short Bull later recalled. "If it had not been for that attack by Crook on Powder River, we would have come in to the agency that spring, and there would have been no Sioux war."

During the summer of 1876, He Dog participated in Battle of the Rosebud and Battle of the Little Bighorn. He also fought at Slim Buttes in September 1876 and Wolf Mountain in January 1877. He finally surrendered at the Red Cloud Agency with Crazy Horse in May 1877. Following the killing of Crazy Horse, He Dog accompanied the Oglala to Washington, D.C. as a delegate to meet the President.

He Dog and other members of the Soreback Band fled the Red Cloud Agency after its removal to the Missouri River during the winter of 1877–78. Crossing into Canada, they joined Sitting Bull in exile for the next two years. Most of the northern Oglala surrendered at Fort Keogh in 1880 and were then transferred to the Standing Rock Agency in the summer of 1881. He Dog and all the northern Oglala were finally transferred to the Pine Ridge Reservation to join their relatives in the spring of 1882.

He Dog lived the remainder of his life on the Pine Ridge Reservation. He served as a respected Indian judge and later in life, was interviewed by a number of historians, including Walter Mason Camp, Eleanor Hinman and Mari Sandoz. He died in 1936 between the ages of 95 or 96.

== Portraits ==
- By D. S. Mitchell, 1877.
- By Mathew Brady, Washington, D.C., 1877. Library of Congress
- By Charles M. Bell, Washington, D.C., 1877. Smithsonian Institution and Oglala Lakota College.
- By Charles M. Bell, Washington, D.C., 1877. Smithsonian Institution and Oglala Lakota College.
- By Alexander Gardner, Washington, D.C., 1877. Smithsonian Institution and Oglala Lakota College.
- By L. T. Butterfield, Sioux Fall, SD, 1891. Denver Public Library and Yale University and at New York Public Library.
- Photographer and date unknown, circa. 1928. Oglala Lakota College.
- Photographer and date unknown, circa. 1928. Oglala Lakota College.
- He Dog's house, Pine Ridge Reservation, 1928. Photographer unknown. Oglala Lakota College.

Misidentified Portraits

- By John A. Anderson, circa. 1900. Library of Congress. This portrait is actually of a Brulé headman also named He Dog.

== Interviews ==
- He Dog interview, July 13, 1910, with Walter Mason Camp, on the Battle of the Little Bighorn.
- He Dog Interview, August 1920, with Gen. H. L. Scott.
- He Dog Interviews with Eleanor Hinman, 1930

== Bibliography ==
- Dickson, Ephriam. 2006. "Reconstructing the Indian Village on the Little Bighorn: The Cankahuhan or Soreback Band, Oglala " Greasy Grass, vol. 22 no. 1: 2-14
