= Crazy Horse =

Lakota war leader (c. 1840–1877)

- Tȟašúŋke Witkó
- A 1934 sketch of Crazy Horse made by a Mormon missionary after interviewing Crazy Horse's sister, who claimed the depiction was accurate.

Oglala leader

Personal details
- Born: Čháŋ Óhaŋ (lit. ''Among the Trees'') c. 1840 near Rapid Creek, Black Hills, unorganized U.S. territory
- Died: September 5, 1877 (aged 36–37) Fort Robinson, Nebraska, U.S.
- Cause of death: Bayonet wound
- Spouses: Tȟašína Sápa Wiŋ (Black Shawl) (m. 1871); Nellie Larrabee (Laravie)
- Relations: Little Hawk (brother); Laughing One (sister)
- Children: 1
- Parent: Crazy Horse, also known as Waglúla (Worm)

Military service
- Battles/wars: Fetterman Fight; Battle of the Rosebud; Battle of the Little Bighorn

Crazy Horse (Lakota: Tȟašúŋke Witkó (Note: Also see: Lakota Language Consortium (2008). New Lakota Dictionary) [tˣaˈʃʊ̃kɛ wɪtˈkɔ], lit. 'His-Horse-Is-Crazy'; c. 1840 – September 5, 1877) was a Lakota war leader of the Oglala band and one of the most renowned Native American figures of the nineteenth century. Known for his commitment to defending Lakota lands and lifeways, he emerged as a central figure in the northern Great Plains during a period of intense conflict with the United States. Crazy Horse resisted U.S. expansion into the Powder River Country, rejecting treaty settlements and reservation life, and became widely respected for both his tactical skill and his personal humility, which included a lifelong avoidance of being photographed.

He played leading roles in several major engagements, including the 1866 Fetterman Fight, in which a combined Lakota, Cheyenne, and Arapaho force annihilated a U.S. Army detachment, and the 1876 Battle of the Little Bighorn, where he helped lead the combined Native forces that defeated the 7th Cavalry under George Armstrong Custer. His reputation as a warrior and strategist earned him admiration among his own people and grudging respect from his adversaries.

After months of pursuit during the Great Sioux War of 1876–1877, Crazy Horse surrendered to U.S. forces in May 1877, seeking to secure the survival of his band amid famine and military pressure. Tensions with military authorities and rival Lakota leaders soon followed. In September 1877, after being brought to Camp Robinson in northwestern Nebraska, he was fatally wounded by a bayonet in the course of an alleged struggle with a guard while being confined to the post guardhouse. His death quickly became the subject of conflicting accounts, but he has since endured as a symbol of Lakota resistance and cultural integrity.

== Early life ==
Conflicting reports exist about Crazy Horse's birth year, but modern biographer Kingsley Bray (among others) claims he was born in 1840. However, according to Šúŋka Bloká (He Dog), he and Crazy Horse "were both born in the same year at the same season of the year," which census records and other interviews place in 1842. Ptehé Wóptuȟ'a (Encouraging Bear), an Oglala medicine man and spiritual adviser to Crazy Horse, reported that Crazy Horse was born "in the year in which the band to which he belonged, the Oglala, stole One Hundred Horses, and in the fall of the year," a reference to the annual Lakota calendar or winter count. Oral history accounts from relatives on the Cheyenne River Reservation place his birth in the spring of 1840. In keeping with oral claims, the late native Lakota speaking author, actor, and educator Joseph Marshall likewise affirmed Crazy Horse's birth year as 1840.

Among the Lakota, black hair was a near-universal attribute—thick, lustrous, and persistent well into adulthood, particularly for males, yet Crazy Horse proved an exception. His hair was notably lighter than the Lakota norm from early childhood, which earned him the nickname Žiží (Light Hair). Bray similarly notes the distinctive hair, adding that as Crazy Horse matured, his lighter complexion and wavy brown-tinged hair earned him the family nickname Pehin Yuhaha (Curly Hair).

=== Immediate family ===
Crazy Horse was born to parents from two different bands of the Lakota division of the Sioux, his father an Oglala and his mother a Miniconjou. His father, born in 1810, was also named Tȟašúŋke Witkó (Crazy Horse). Originally, Crazy Horse was named Čháŋ Óhaŋ (Among the Trees) at birth, meaning he was one with nature. His mother was Rattling Blanket Woman, whom historian George Hyde asserts was Miniconjou and the sister of Spotted Tail, who became a Brulé head chief. She may have also been a member of the Lone Horn family, another prominent tribe amid the Miniconjou. She was said to be beautiful and a fast runner.

One account said that after the son had reached maturity and shown his strength, his father gave him his name and took a new one, Waglúla (Worm). Another version of how the younger Crazy Horse acquired his name stems from his haŋbléčheya ceremony, during which he was told to kill a red-tailed hawk and then at a gathering of holy men, a ceremony was performed conferring the name. Crazy Horse's cousin (son of Hewáŋžiča, Lone Horn) was Maȟpíya Ičáȟtagya (Touch the Clouds); the two were close friends. He saved Crazy Horse's life at least once.

In 1844, an Oglala raiding party attempted to steal some horses from the Crow but were discovered; among the raiding party was Rattling Blanket Woman's brother, He Crow, who was killed along with thirty-eight other Oglala tribesmen. Grief stricken by the loss of her beloved brother, Rattling Blanket Woman—who was supposedly carrying Worm's third child, according to one of her descendants—went into despair, found a "sturdy cottonwood" tree and hanged herself, which traumatized young Crazy Horse and the family kept secret. Worm went into mourning for four years. Rattling Blanket Woman's sister, Good Looking Woman, left her husband, offered herself as Worm's replacement wife, and stayed on to raise Crazy Horse. Other versions of the legend posit that Good Looking Woman was likewise grief-stricken by the deaths of those she knew.

=== White expansion and the impact of the Grattan Massacre ===
During the first decade of Crazy Horse's life and into his early pre-teen years, white settler expansion proved detrimental to the Lakota people. Then in 1854, a dispute over a cow belonging to a Mormon emigrant party encamped near Fort Laramie precipitated a confrontation that would prove formative for the young Crazy Horse. Lieutenant John Lawrence Grattan, dispatched to arrest the Miniconjou man responsible, arrived at the Brulé camp with twenty-nine soldiers and an interpreter; when negotiations collapsed, Grattan ordered his men to fire. Conquering Bear, the Lakota head chief, fell wounded, and the Lakota—vastly outnumbering the soldiers—killed Grattan and all but one of his men in what became known as the Grattan massacre. The mortally wounded Conquering Bear was carried east by the Brulé, dying of his wounds several days later along the Niobrara River. The effect of Conquering Bear's death on the teenage Crazy Horse is a matter of contested tradition rather than documented history. That he subsequently experienced a vision afterward is better attested than the precise circumstances surrounding it.

=== Visions ===
According to the most widely repeated account, which derives principally from the white trader and interpreter William Garnett—who claimed to have heard it from Crazy Horse himself in 1868—Crazy Horse fasted for two days on the open plains, keeping himself awake by placing sharp stones beneath his body; when no vision came, he descended toward his horse hobbled near a lake, and the vision overtook him there, possibly because he fainted. In the vision, a man rode out of the lake on horseback, changing colors as he approached and floating above the ground. He wore plain leggings and a simple shirt, his face unpainted, a single eagle feather in his long brown hair, and a small brown stone tied behind one ear. The man told Crazy Horse never to wear a war bonnet, never to tie up his horse's tail, and to rub dust over his hair and body before battle; he would never be killed by a bullet or an enemy, and should never take anything for himself. Arrows and bullets disappeared around the man as he rode; he was seized repeatedly by those behind him, but broke free each time. A storm arose—lightning appeared on his cheeks, hailstones on his body—and as a hawk screamed overhead, the vision faded.

Garnett's account, recorded decades after Crazy Horse's death, warrants measured scrutiny. Chips (Wóptura), (Note: The name commonly rendered as "Horn Chips" for Crazy Horse's medicine man is an error that has propagated since its first publication in 1982. He was given the name "Chips" by the government and was known as Old Man Chips. Horn Chips was one of his sons, also known as Charles Chips.) Crazy Horse's longtime friend and spiritual mentor—the medicine man who interpreted the war leader's vision and provided the talismans he carried into battle—stated flatly: "There is no truth in the story of the horseman coming out of the pond and telling Crazy Horse what to do." Black Elk, a cousin of Crazy Horse, offered a different rendering, learned secondhand from his father, explaining that Crazy Horse:

...dreamed and went into the world where there is nothing but the spirits of things. That is the real world that is behind this one, and everything we see here is something like a shadow from that world. He was on his horse in that world, and the horse and himself on it and the trees and the grass and the stones and everything were made of spirit, and nothing was hard, and everything seemed to float. ... It was this vision that gave him his great power, for when he went into a fight, he had only to think of that world to be in it again, so that he could go through anything and not be hurt.

He Dog corroborated at least the outward expression of the vision in Crazy Horse's battle preparation: he never wore a war bonnet; Chips had given him power on the condition that he wear an eagle-bone whistle and one feather in battle, and carry a certain round stone with a hole in it beneath his left arm on a leather thong over his shoulder. Crazy Horse's brother-in-law, Red Feather, likewise reported that he wore a stone on a thong under his left arm when going into battle.

=== Personality ===
Crazy Horse was profoundly "scarred by personal tragedy and loss," which rendered him melancholic and reticent; for the Lakota people, this implied he was a heyoka or a "dreamer of thunder." He was otherwise considered "reserved", since often he refrained from speaking at meetings of the council elders, and his shyness could be misunderstood as aloofness. Crazy Horse was nonetheless generous to the poor, the elderly, and children alike. In John Neihardt's Black Elk Speaks, one finds the following about Crazy Horse:

...he was a queer man and would go about the village without noticing people or saying anything. In his own teepee, he would joke, and when he was on the warpath with a small party, he would joke to make his warriors feel good. But around the village, he hardly ever noticed anybody, except little children. All the Lakotas like to dance and sing, but he never joined a dance, and they say nobody ever heard him sing. But everybody liked him, and they would do anything he wanted or go anywhere he said.

Black Elk also stated that Crazy Horse never wanted much for himself and that unlike other chiefs, he had few ponies. Aside from his austere nature, Crazy Horse was said to have "deplored alcohol and its effect on tribes."

Given his standing as a great warrior and his revered place among the Lakota people, Crazy Horse could have led in an authoritarian fashion, but as Joseph Marshall relates, because of his personality and character, he instead led by example.

== War leadership ==
=== Early exploits and title of "Shirt Wearer" ===
Through the late 1850s and early 1860s, Crazy Horse's reputation as a warrior grew, as did his fame among the Lakota. The Lakota told accounts of him in their oral histories. His first kill was a Shoshone raider who had murdered a Lakota woman washing buffalo meat along the Powder River. After the skirmish with the Shoshone was complete, Crazy Horse had collected a scalp and two horses. Crazy Horse fought in numerous battles between the Lakota and their traditional enemies, the Crow, Shoshone, Pawnee, Blackfeet, and Arikara, among the Plains tribes.

Following the transformative visionary experiences of 1857 and Crazy Horse's demonstrated war-fighting abilities, his father became a convinced believer in his son's singular capacity for leadership. Warriors and visionaries from across the northern Oglala and Miniconjou bands shared that conviction—among them High Backbone, who declared that Crazy Horse would be the greatest warrior of his generation. Holy men from the Wakan family of the Oyuhpe band prepared a sacred bundle containing the stuffed skin of a hawk, its layers of skin and cloth enclosing additional charms consecrated through prayer and song. This bundle constituted his wotawe—his protective war charm—which he opened reverently in moments of crisis. The hawk embodied controlled swiftness and endurance, twin attributes of the warrior. Crazy Horse was instructed to "remember" his guardian spirit through an acute mental discipline in which hawk and dreamer became one; at times, he rode into battle wearing the whole body of the hawk tied in his hair, though as additional visionary powers accrued, he more commonly wore two or three of its feathers at his crown. The holy men advised him to carefully study the hawk's patient scanning and split-second calculation before a killing stoop. Recounting his friend's "attention to marksmanship," He Dog stated that Crazy Horse " ... wanted to be sure that he hit what he aimed at."

During the spring of 1859, Crazy Horse participated in a raid of repudiation (accompanied by his Oglala friend, He Dog) against some Crow raiders who had killed two sons belonging to the Miniconjou chief Black Shield. The brief and successful operation included a trek down the Yellowstone River before ending at the Little Bighorn, where the Lakotas killed eleven Crow men and women, forcing the Crows westward.

That winter, Crazy Horse joined the Oglala on a successful buffalo hunt, felling ten cows and distributing all the meat among unsuccessful hunters and elders—keeping only the tongues, which he sent to the council tipi that evening. The episode confirmed his standing as hunter and warrior alike, his generosity earning him a song of thanks from the returning hunters.

At Pryor Creek in the summer of 1863, a combined Oglala, Cheyenne, Miniconjou, and Arapaho war party engaged a disciplined Crow defensive line protecting a tightly drawn village circle. No warrior distinguished himself more conspicuously than Crazy Horse, who charged through concentrated arrow and musket fire at the head of the Lakota line and vaulted from his wounded pony to pursue a fleeing Crow on foot, killing and scalping him before withdrawing unharmed. Neither side could dislodge the other; with Crow reinforcements raising dust on the horizon, Crazy Horse and the other leaders ordered a disengagement, casualties standing at five Oglalas and five Cheyennes. The engagement entered both Lakota and Crow annals as a defining encounter of the war years 1858–1865; for many outside his own band, it also marked the moment Crazy Horse's name first passed from mouth to mouth as something more than local reputation.

By the mid-1860s, Crazy Horse's reputation had crystallized into a distinct war ethos that described him as courageous but never reckless, and as one who would not charge without careful forethought. He Dog later recalled that "Crazy Horse always stuck close to his rifle" and demanded the same level of discipline from his followers. An inter-band cohort of warriors coalesced around Crazy Horse, convinced of his invulnerability; this included close comrades in the Bad Face band, kinsmen among the Oyuhpes, and Miniconjou allies like High Backbone. Though Crazy Horse never sought a position as chief, this network of support constituted precisely the foundation on which tribal leadership rested.

In 1864, after the Third Colorado Cavalry decimated Cheyenne and Arapaho in the Sand Creek Massacre, Oglala and Minneconjou bands allied with them against the U.S. military. Crazy Horse was present at the Battle of Platte Bridge and the Battle of Red Buttes in July 1865. Because of his fighting ability and his generosity to the tribe, in 1865, Crazy Horse was named an Ogle Tanka Un ("Shirt Wearer", or war leader) by the tribe. For a Lakota in his mid-twenties, this honor demonstrated how highly esteemed Crazy Horse was among his people.

=== Battle of the Hundred in the Hand (Fetterman Fight) ===
On December 21, 1866, during Red Cloud's War, Crazy Horse led a decoy party that lured Captain William J. Fetterman and his command of eighty-one soldiers out of Fort Phil Kearny and into a carefully coordinated ambush by a combined force of Lakota, Cheyenne, and Arapaho warriors numbering nearly 1,000. Ironically, Captain Fetterman had once boasted that a "single company of regulars could whip a thousand Indians," and that a "full regiment could whip the entire array of hostile tribes," as well as how with a contingent of just "eighty men," he could "ride through the Sioux nation." Fetterman had been dispatched to relieve a wood train under attack; instead, Crazy Horse and a small party of decoys drew the column northeast over Lodge Trail Ridge and down toward Peno Creek, where the concealed warriors closed on all sides. Grummond's cavalry, following a separate group of decoys along Peno Head Ridge, was similarly enveloped; when he turned back toward Fetterman's infantry, both forces were already surrounded.

All eighty-one soldiers and civilians were killed. At the time, the Fetterman Massacre was the worst military defeat suffered by the U.S. Army on the Great Plains, which "brought thunderous cries for the extermination of the native peoples" living on the plains from the American public. According to Marshall, the Lakota and Cheyenne people refer to this event as "the Battle of the Hundred in the Hand" or as the Opawinge Napogna Wicayuhapi.

=== Wagon Box Fight ===
On August 2, 1867, Crazy Horse led the Oglala contingent in the Wagon Box Fight, part of a coordinated Lakota and Cheyenne strike against Fort Phil Kearny's wood-cutting operation. The attacking force—Oglalas under Crazy Horse, Miniconjous under High Backbone, and Sans Arc under Thunderhawk—numbered approximately one thousand warriors. Crazy Horse directed the opening assault on the side camp south of Little Piney Creek, driving off the woodcutters and destroying their wagons before the main body turned on the corral itself—an oval enclosure of fourteen wheel-less wagon boxes where Captain James Powell's command of thirty-two men had taken cover.

The defenders were armed with newly issued Springfield-Allin breech-loading rifles and seven thousand rounds of ammunition; a combination that repelled three successive assaults and proved decisive. A relief column from the fort, announced by a mountain howitzer, ended the engagement around midday. Powell's losses totaled three killed and two wounded at the corral, with four additional whites killed at the side camp; Lakota casualties remain contested, though historians writing from the Native perspective have regarded high estimates as wildly exaggerated. Despite heavier losses, the Lakota did not regard the outcome as a defeat, having captured substantial numbers of horses and mules, and they continued to raid the Bozeman Trail in the aftermath.

== Great Sioux War of 1876–1877 ==
On June 17, 1876, Crazy Horse was among the Lakota and Cheyenne leaders who struck General George Crook's column of more than 1,000 troops and 250 Crow and Shoshone auxiliaries along Rosebud Creek in what became known as the Battle of the Rosebud. Short Buffalo recalled that when Crook's initial charge threatened to break the line, "Crazy Horse, Bad Heart Bull, Black Deer, Kicking Bear, and Good Weasel rallied the Sioux, turned the charge, and got the soldiers on the run." General Crook retreated south to Goose Creek the following morning; his withdrawal delayed his junction with George A. Custer's 7th Cavalry and contributed to Custer's defeat a week later. In the end, the Battle of the Rosebud was less a decisive engagement than a strategic disruption—Crazy Horse and the Lakota and Cheyenne warriors effectively neutralized Crook's column at the critical moment when three converging army columns were meant to trap the free-living bands between them, leaving Custer without the southern support that might have altered the outcome at the Little Bighorn eight days later.

On June 25, 1876, in what became known as the Battle of the Little Bighorn, Custer's 7th Cavalry attacked a massive Lakota, Northern Cheyenne, and Arapaho encampment along the Little Bighorn River—badly underestimating both the size of the village and the resolve of its defenders; the result was the annihilation of Custer and five companies of the 7th Cavalry, the worst U.S. Army defeat of the Plains Indian Wars. Gall's Hunkpapa warriors bore the brunt of the initial fighting; Crazy Horse's precise tactical role remains contested, though his participation and personal courage are well attested in Native eyewitness accounts. Water Man, one of only five Arapaho warriors who fought, recalled that Crazy Horse "was the bravest man I ever saw. He rode closest to the soldiers, yelling to his warriors. All the soldiers were shooting at him, but he was never hit." Holding his Winchester rifle above his head, Crazy Horse encouraged his warriors, shouting for them to remain strong. Historian Mike Sajna's reconstruction of the battle places Crazy Horse first in an engagement with Reno's troops—charging into their midst, driving them to the river, striking men with his war club and pulling others from their horses—before riding to meet Custer's column at the lower end of the village; Gall later recalled seeing him in a ravine north of Calhoun Hill, firing as fast as he could load his rifle, (Note: A similar, if not hyperbolic, account of Crazy Horse's exploits is found in Bray's book, with Flying Hawk claiming: "He shot them as fast as he could load his gun. They fell off their horses as fast as he could shoot.") before he rode out to lead the charge that overran the soldier line. The popular image of Crazy Horse leading a thousand warriors in a decisive flanking charge that sealed Custer's fate at Little Big Horn is a post-battle literary construction unsupported by primary accounts; instead, what the sources confirm is a warrior of singular courage who fought in both the Reno and Custer phases of the battle—the signal Lakota victory of the Great Sioux War—at an engagement that ultimately sealed the fate of Lakota resistance to white settlement and encroachment.

The Battle of Slim Buttes on September 9, 1876, comprised four distinct engagements—Captain Anson Mills's pre-dawn assault on a sleeping Lakota village, the ravine fight surrounding the surrender and death of (Old Man) American Horse, Crazy Horse's counterattack that afternoon with an estimated six to eight hundred warriors, and a rear-guard skirmish the following morning. Army and civilian casualties totaled three killed and twenty-four wounded; approximately ten Lakota were killed or wounded.

On January 8, 1877, Crazy Horse's warriors fought their last major engagement at the Battle of Wolf Mountain, pitting roughly 600 Lakota and Cheyenne against 450 soldiers in a blizzard along the Tongue River in Montana Territory. Casualties were light on both sides, but the failure to dislodge the soldiers and Sitting Bull's subsequent departure for Canada broke the remaining will to resist. Crazy Horse surrendered at Fort Robinson, Nebraska on May 6, 1877. His retinue was the last significant Lakota holdout to come in, and Crazy Horse's capitulation proved part of a broader post-war reckoning that would claim his life that September, and those of Spotted Tail in 1881 and Sitting Bull in 1890.

== Last Sun Dance of 1877 ==
The Last Sun Dance of 1877 is significant in Lakota history as the Sun Dance held to honor Crazy Horse one year after the victory at the Battle of the Little Big Horn, and to offer prayers for him in the trying times ahead. Crazy Horse attended the Sun Dance as the honored guest but did not take part in the dancing. Five warrior cousins sacrificed blood and flesh for Crazy Horse at the Last Sun Dance of 1877. The five warrior cousins were three brothers, Flying Hawk, Kicking Bear, and Black Fox II, all sons of Chief Black Fox, also known as Great Kicking Bear, and two other cousins, Eagle Thunder and Walking Eagle. (Note: Major Israel McCreight, who personally witnessed the tragic plight of Native Americans following the Battle of Wounded Knee, wrote a work with the Sioux chief, Flying Hawk, who related that Young Black Fox was actually his half-brother and Kicking Bear was his full brother.) On September 4, 1877, Young Black Fox commanded Crazy Horse's warriors in the latter's absence—a display of courage that earned him the regard of both Lakota and white observers alike. That same year, he sought sanctuary in Canada, but he did not survive his return to the United States, falling in 1881 at the hands of warriors from a rival tribe.

== Surrender and death ==
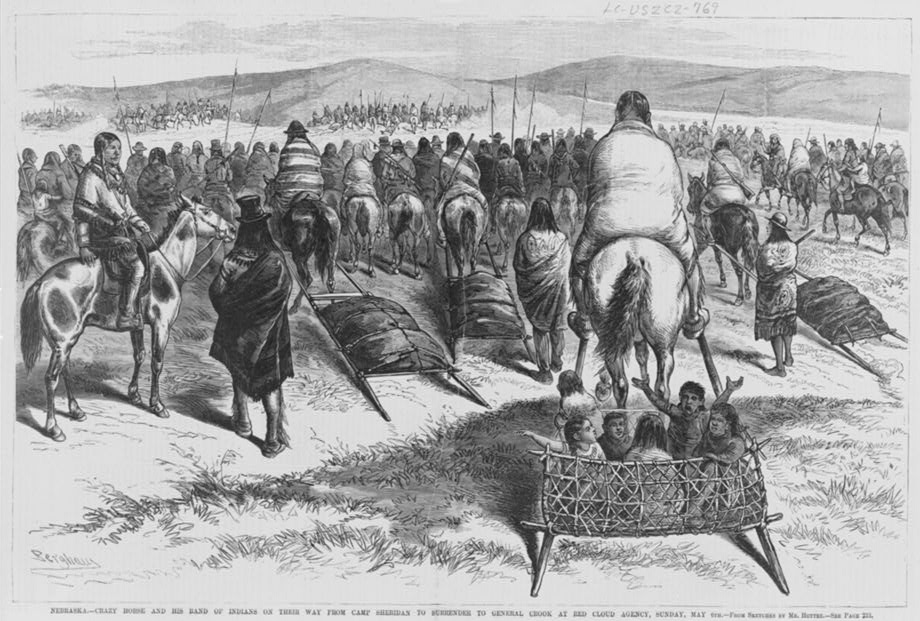
Artist's rendering of Crazy Horse and his band of Oglala on their way from Camp Sheridan to surrender to General Crook at Red Cloud Agency

When Crazy Horse arrived at the Red Cloud Agency near Fort Robinson, Nebraska, on May 6, 1877, roughly 900 Oglala warriors accompanied him. As the two-mile-long column approached, no whooping or celebrating broke the silence; from one end to the other arose a solemn peace chant, moving one watching officer to exclaim: "By God! This is a triumphal march, not a surrender!" Only Lieutenant William P. Clark and two interpreters remained as witnesses when Crazy Horse and his warriors laid down their arms.

For the four months following his surrender, Crazy Horse resided in his village near the Red Cloud Agency, where the attention he received from the Army drew the resentment of Red Cloud and Spotted Tail—both long-established agency chiefs who regarded him as a destabilizing presence. In August 1877, when Lieutenant Clark asked him to join the Army against the Nez Perce of Chief Joseph, Crazy Horse and Miniconjou leader Touch the Clouds objected, citing the peace terms of their surrender; he ultimately agreed, reportedly saying he would fight "till all the Nez Perce were killed"—but scout Frank Grouard misinterpreted his words, reporting instead that Crazy Horse had said he would "go north and fight until not a white man is left." The mistranslation, compounded by rumors circulated by supporters of Red Cloud and Spotted Tail, proved fatal to whatever trust remained.

General George Crook, warned by Woman's Dress—a nephew of Red Cloud—that Crazy Horse planned to kill him during a scheduled council, ordered his arrest and departed Fort Robinson, leaving Lieutenant Colonel Luther P. Bradley to carry out the order. On September 4, 1877, two columns moved against Crazy Horse's village, only to find it had scattered overnight—Crazy Horse having fled to the Spotted Tail Agency with his ailing wife. After tense negotiations at Camp Sheridan, where Spotted Tail confronted his nephew publicly and Touch the Clouds escorted Crazy Horse with some three hundred armed warriors, Crazy Horse agreed to return to Fort Robinson with Lieutenant Jesse M. Lee—on the promise that he would be given an opportunity to tell his side of the story.

Departing Camp Sheridan on the morning of September 5, Crazy Horse realized he was essentially a prisoner well before reaching Fort Robinson—at one point dashing ahead of his escort, possibly to receive a knife from a Lakota family he encountered on the trail. Approximately three to six thousand Lakota assembled at Camp Robinson to await his arrival; he was permitted a brief word with his old friend He Dog before being led toward Bradley's office. Upon arriving, Lee was informed that Crazy Horse was to be turned over to the officer of the day; Bradley had no intention of hearing his side of the story; his orders were that Crazy Horse be arrested and shipped immediately to Omaha and then to Florida—a painful discovery for both Crazy Horse and the agent who had made him promises. Captain James Kennington and Little Big Man escorted the war chief toward the guardhouse.

The moment Crazy Horse saw or sensed the filthy cells, he whirled and attempted to break for the parade ground; Little Big Man jumped on his back, but Crazy Horse freed one arm and cut him across the wrist. Private William Gentles ran forward and bayoneted him—once certainly, possibly twice, with one thrust piercing the kidneys. Crazy Horse sank down, crying out, "Let me go, my friend—you have hurt me plenty bad!" Dr. Valentine McGillycuddy, who reached him moments later, found him "on his back, grinding his teeth and frothing at the mouth, blood trickling from a bayonet wound above the hip, and the pulse weak and missing beats," and immediately recognized the wound as fatal. Touch the Clouds intervened to prevent Bradley from moving the dying man to the guardhouse, declaring that Crazy Horse was a chief and could not be imprisoned; McGillycuddy had to petition Bradley twice before he relented and permitted Crazy Horse to be carried to the adjutant's office instead.

There, refusing a cot and lying on the floor, Crazy Horse was administered morphine; his father, Worm, spoke to him, and Crazy Horse roused himself long enough to say: "Father, it is no good for the people to depend on me any longer—I am bad hurt." He died later that night on September 6, 1877. When Touch the Clouds went out to bring the news to the waiting Sioux, a wailing rose from the parade ground and the surrounding tents. His body was returned to his elderly parents; after wandering the fort for three days in grief, they were permitted to place him on a burial scaffold outside the post. When the Spotted Tail Agency was relocated to the Missouri River the following month, they took his remains on a travois and buried him at an undisclosed location—legend places the site near Wounded Knee Creek, though his final resting place remains unknown.

=== Conflicting accounts over death ===
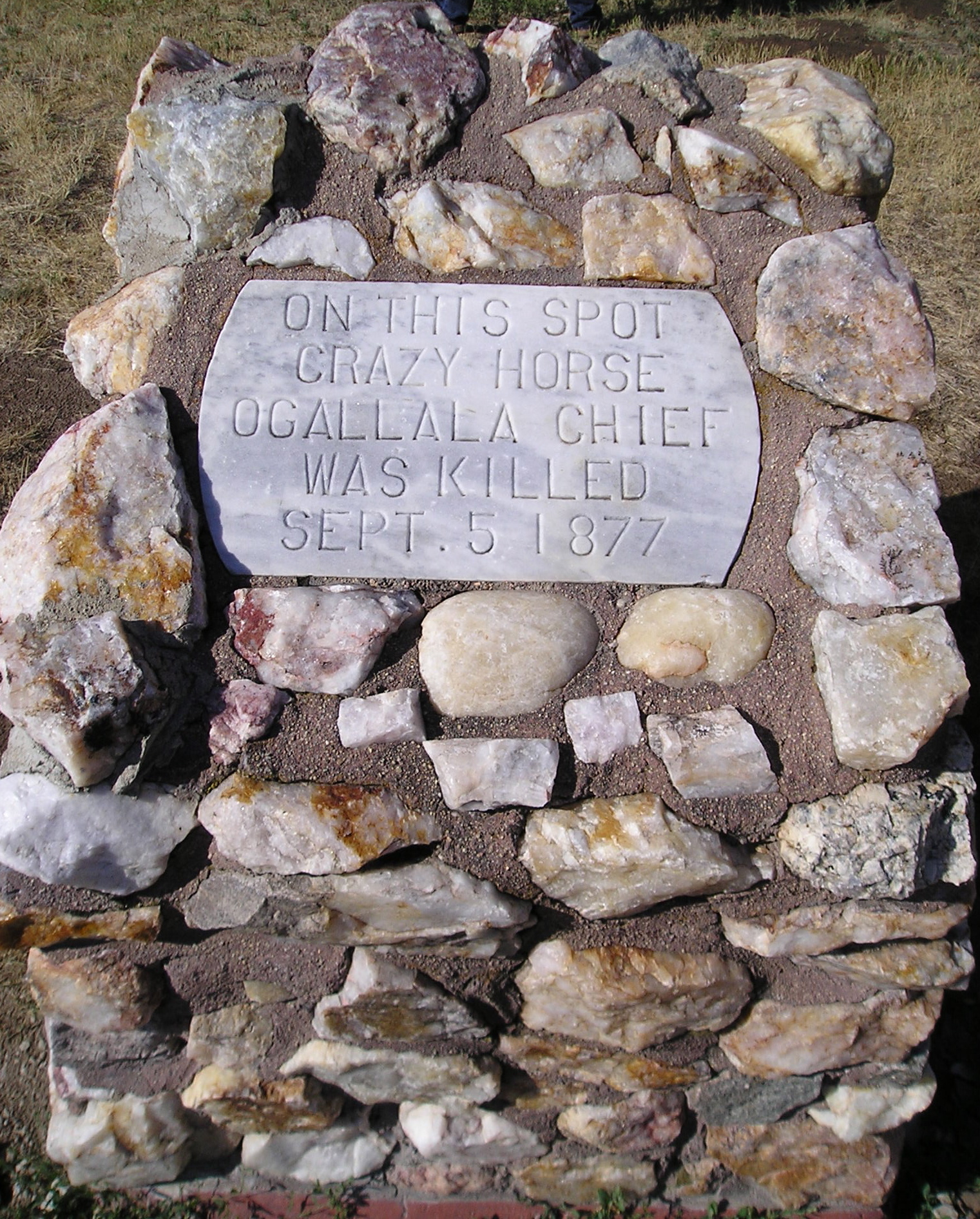
A monument dedicated to Crazy Horse's memory. Although Crazy Horse was never named a Chief, he was honored as a Shirt Wearer.

The precise circumstances of Crazy Horse's death remain contested among the seventeen known eyewitness accounts provided by the Lakota, the army, and mixed-blood alike. General Bradley's official account, reproduced by Bourke, states that when Crazy Horse was put in the guardhouse, "he suddenly drew a knife, struck at the guard, and made for the door." Little Big Man "grappled with him" and was cut in the arm during the struggle; at which point Bourke reported that Crazy Horse "received a severe wound in the lower part of the abdomen, either from a knife or bayonet, the surgeons are in doubt which." Touch the Clouds, who remained with Crazy Horse until he died, laid his hand on the fallen war chief's breast and said: "It is good; he has looked for death, and it has come."

In 1881, U.S. Army Captain and later acclaimed author and ethnologist, John Gregory Bourke, interviewed Little Big Man at a Sun Dance. To this end, he recorded the sole dissenting account of the event. According to Little Big Man, when the scuffle occurred, he claims to have held down Crazy Horse's arms at the elbows, which unintentionally deflected Crazy Horse's own stiletto-shaped knife into the latter's abdomen. Little Big Man's first thought was it would probably be "best to let the idea prevail that a soldier had done the killing..." so as to reduce the likelihood of his relatives seeking revenge. Bourke noted that he was inclined to believe Little Big Man's version, though it stands alone among the eyewitness records—every other account attributes the fatal wound to the sentinel's bayonet. The identity of the guard is itself contested; only one eyewitness account identifies him as Private William Gentles, and when historian Walter M. Camp circulated that account among others who had been present, two additional names were offered—leaving the question unresolved in the scholarly literature.

Dr. McGillycuddy recorded that Crazy Horse "died about midnight," though military records place the time before midnight—making the date September 5, 1877 rather than September 6. Bourke's epitaph was characteristically direct: "As the grave of Custer marked high-water mark of Sioux supremacy in the trans-Missouri region, so the grave of Crazy Horse marked the ebb."

== Photograph controversy and physical appearance ==
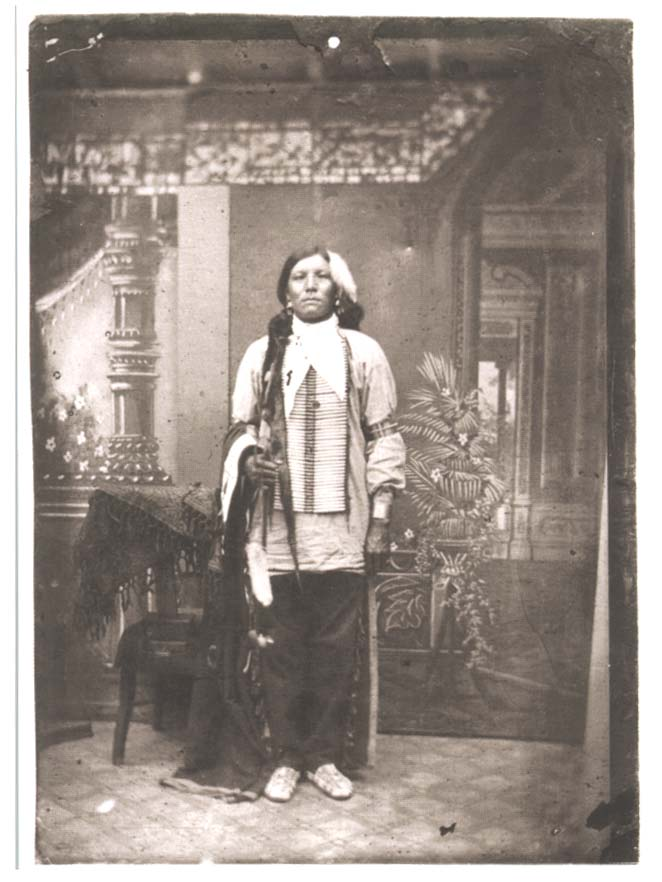
Alleged photo of Crazy Horse in 1877; a claim that contradicts the available evidence about the Lakota chief's appearance

Most sources question whether Crazy Horse was ever photographed. Dr. Valentine McGillycuddy, who had personally tended to Crazy Horse's ailing wife in 1877 and even "tried hard" to get the war chief photographed, doubted that any picture of him was ever captured. One small tintype portrait purports to be of Crazy Horse, which both the Custer Battlefield Trading Post and the Custer Battlefield Museum in Montana promote as authentic; however, the figure in the image lacks the facial scars, the "beak-like nose" or other physical features attributed to Crazy Horse and is wearing attire never seen on the Oglala warrior of fame.

Those who saw or personally knew Crazy Horse, such as He Dog or Horn Chips, described him as having notably light-colored hair, lighter skin than was typical among the Lakota, and facial features considered atypical of Native Americans. He Dog said specifically of his old friend: "He was not a very big man. He was of medium stature and build." Despite some contention among those who knew Crazy Horse about the exact structure of the scarring on the Oglala warrior's face, all of them corroborated that it was on the left side, including Civil War veteran and frontiersman George Washington Oaks. A report in the New York Sun from May 1877 recorded, "A bullet wound through his left cheek ... disfigures his face and gives to the mouth a drawn and somewhat fierce or brutal expression."

Other Oglala warriors familiar with Crazy Horse from childhood—including Red Feather, Short Bull, Little Killer, and White Bull—recounted his light complexion and hair, narrow face, and atypical nose. Interpreter and scout Frank Grouard stated that: "Crazy Horse had somewhat peculiar features. He had sandy hair and was of very light complexion. He didn't have the high cheekbones that the Indians generally have ... He was a young looking Indian—appeared much younger than his age. There were a few powder marks on one side of his face." Grouard later added: "Crazy Horse was remarkably white for an Indian ... His hair, which was a sandy brown, was unlike any other man in the tribe." Another interpreter, Louis Bordeaux, noted that Crazy Horse was tall and thin, while his sister Susan (who saw him on a few occasions) stated, that he "was very handsome young man of about thirty-six years or so. He was not so dark. He had hazel eyes, nice long light brown hair; his scalp lock was ornamented with beads and hung clear to his waist; his braids were wrapped in fur ... He was of above medium height and was slender."

After Crazy Horse's surrender in May 1877, Bourke described Crazy Horse as being "five feet eight inches high, lithe and sinewy, with a scar in his face. The expression of his countenance was one of quiet dignity, but morose, dogged, tenacious, and melancholy. He behaved with stolidity, like a man who realized he had to give in to Fate, but would do so as sullenly as possible." While Bourke's description focuses less on how unusual Crazy Horse appeared, the other accounts make it "evident" in Kane's estimation that he was not a typical looking Lakota man.

== Love life ==
=== Affair with Black Buffalo Woman ===
One aspect of Crazy Horse's life subject to scrutiny has been his adulterous relationship with the "famously beautiful" Black Buffalo Woman. She was the wife of No Water, who was aware for some time that Crazy Horse was interested in his wife. Bray speculates that on occasions when No Water was absent, Crazy Horse may have attempted to court her.

It was after a substantial battle with the Crow in 1870 and their subsequent pursuit by Crazy Horse's retinue that Black Buffalo Woman "gave in to Crazy Horse's attention" and left her children in the care of friends to accompany him on the endeavor. Even though Lakota customs permitted women to divorce their husbands at any time by numerous means, and some form of compensation would have been expected to cover the emotional damages for the tribe's sake, No Water was not amenable to this idea. Add to this that a two-fold jealousy could have been a factor, since No Water too was once a candidate for shirt-wearer but was "passed over" in favor of his wife's new locus of affection, Crazy Horse. To this end, He Dog avowed that No Water refused to "let the woman go", which placed Crazy Horse and his love interest in a dangerous predicament.

No Water tracked down Crazy Horse and Black Buffalo Woman and strode into the lodge where the attendant company was encamped and exclaimed "My friend... I have come!" just feet away from Crazy Horse, when he leveled a pistol at him. Touch the Clouds, Crazy Horse's first cousin and son of Lone Horn, jumped up with his knife but was restrained, but Little Big Man seized No Water, which knocked the pistol upward as it fired, deflecting the bullet to Crazy Horse's upper jaw, fracturing it causing him to collapse into the fire. No Water left, wrongly convinced he had killed Crazy Horse. Warriors loyal to Crazy Horse "scoured the valley" looking for No Water, but the latter's men had "spirited" him away to safety.

Miniconjou camp elders, such as Ashes and Bull Head made great efforts toward reconciliation; meanwhile, Touch the Clouds visited Crazy Horse as he recovered in an attempt to convince him to "drop his claims to Black Buffalo Woman" but Crazy Horse was hesitant since he feared for her safety. Despite Crazy's Horse's folly, a counsel determined that No Water's actions were too extreme and "an act of culpable folly". As compensation for the shooting, No Water gave Crazy Horse three horses, and Crazy Horse eventually agreed that Black Buffalo Woman should return to her husband, effectively ending their affair. Due to Crazy Horse's censurable activities with a married woman, he was ultimately stripped of his title as Shirt Wearer (leader), Despite Crazy Horse having given up his relationship to Black Buffalo Woman to No Water's benefit, bad blood continued to linger between them.

=== Black Shawl and Nellie Larrabee ===
Crazy Horse married Black Shawl in 1871, a member of the Oglala Lakota. The elders sent her to heal Crazy Horse after his altercation with No Water. Black Shawl gave birth to Crazy Horse's only child, a daughter named They Are Afraid Of Her, who died in 1873. Upon learning of They Are Afraid Of Her's death, as he had been away leading a war party against the Crow, Crazy Horse reportedly was overcome by grief and insisted on going to the scaffold site—where the body is elevated above the ground and cremated—and mourned there for three consecutive days and nights. Black Shawl outlived both Crazy Horse and the daughter she shared with him by many years, eventually succumbing in 1927 to influenza during the outbreaks of the 1920s.

One final figure that appears in Crazy Horse's love life was the "mixed-blood" woman, (Note: In an interview captured for posterity, interpreter William Garnett described Nellie Larrabee as "a half-blood woman, not of the best frontier variety".) Nellie Larrabee, with whom he had an "unusual level of trust and communicativeness". Bray surmises that Crazy Horse's unprecedented willingness "to accept her words" much the way he would holy men from among the Lakota, may have been the result of having lost his mother in his youth. Larrabee was the daughter of a French trader named Joe Larrabee and a Cheyenne woman known as Shahunwinla.

Exactly when Crazy Horse met Larrabee remains unknown, which implies that the relationship was likely "conducted with some discretion" for whatever reason. However, once the relationship was known and Larrabee confessed her deep feelings for Crazy Horse to his wife Black Shawl, the latter allowed him to take Larrabee as a second wife. Crazy Horse's courtship of Nellie coincided his surrender—along with some nine hundred Oglalas—at Camp Robinson on 6 May 1877. (Note: Garnett's first-hand account of Crazy Horse's surrender alludes to Larrabee as having caused Crazy Horse to fall into a "domestic trap which insensibly led him by gradual steps to his destruction.") The surrender itself was the product of exhaustion, starvation, and relentless military pressure following the Great Sioux War of 1876–1877.

While at Camp Robinson, Crazy Horse had a terrible dream—where an eagle soaring above him as he stood on a mountain peak, suddenly fell dead at his feet with an arrow through its body—which he took to mean that death was soon coming his way. The vision unsettled him and sharpened a paranoia already well advanced within him that Larrabee reinforced; she cosigned his conviction that the dream indicated that the Washington invitation was a snare and that federal custody, once entered, would be a permanent condition for the Lakota. Historians have been quick to assign calculated motives to Larrabee, but her warnings drew on gossip that moved freely through the mixed-blood community at Red Cloud Agency, fed by newspaper coverage, informal talk around Camp Robinson, and the competing agendas of numerous political factions. Nonetheless, Larrabee's influence in keeping Crazy Horse from venturing to Washington as the Lakota's representative to meet President Rutherford B. Hayes has been seen as a contributing factor to his demise by historians; one modern author characterized her sway as "the poisoning of the chief's mind".

== Legacy ==
The Lakota author Joseph Marshall III wrote that:

The time of Crazy Horse is past, but his leadership style is not passé. Those of us who study him without the obtuse filter of cultural bias see him not as a legend but as an example. An example of making the best of the talents and abilities one has, at the very least. ... Crazy Horse didn't rise to the pinnacles of leadership because he came from an influential family, or because he recited his record of heroic deeds publicly, or because there were no leaders among the Lakota. He rose to leadership because he actually led. He didn't direct or point to where others should go while he waited. He led. He has been called a mystic because his power derived from his visions. Perhaps he was a mystic, and perhaps he was given power through his vision. One thing is certain: he believed what he saw in his dream, and his power came from that belief. And it wasn't necessarily otherworldly power. Crazy Horse used a power that was available to most warriors and warrior leaders of his day: the power of example. He went first, he took the lead, he was the first to face the challenge. When he had to be daring, he was, sometimes to the point of recklessness, as it certainly appeared to most of his fellow warriors. It is what sets him apart from other leaders. But the other factor that enabled his rise to leadership was his humility.

Crazy Horse is collectively remembered among Native Americans (especially for the Lakota) as a noble, if not a tragic military figure, much like other indigenous notables such as Tecumseh of the Shawnee, or Geronimo of the Apache.

American humorist and author Ian Frazier, who personally claimed to have "loved" Crazy Horse as a historical figure, wrote:

Even the most basic outline of his life shows how great he was, because he remained himself from the moment of his birth to the moment he died; because [though] he may have surrendered, ... he was never defeated in battle; because, although he was killed, even the Army admitted he was never captured. His dislike of the oncoming civilization was prophetic. Unlike many people around the world, when he met white men, he was not diminished by the encounter.

Author Chris Hedges contends that "there are few resistance figures in American history as noble as Crazy Horse" and that "his ferocity of spirit remains a guiding light for all who seek lives of defiance."

== Historiography and sources ==
Biographical records on Crazy Horse are beset by complexity; these difficulties include the fact that contemporary documentation is scarce, non-Native perspectives predominate, and claims embedded in oral tradition resist independent verification. Unlike many nineteenth-century Lakota leaders, Crazy Horse left no written statements, signed no treaties, and avoided public speaking; nearly all surviving accounts derive from interviews conducted decades after the events they describe, rendering the evidentiary record fragmentary. Early narratives—including those collected by Eli S. Ricker between 1903 and 1919—preserve valuable Lakota testimony, yet they equally reflect the methodological assumptions of white interviewers and translators.

Twentieth-century biographies further complicated the picture. Mari Sandoz's Crazy Horse: The Strange Man of the Oglalas (1942) popularized a romanticized portrait rooted partly in family oral history but heavily elaborated through reconstructed dialogue and interpretive embellishment. Historians such as George Hyde, Robert Utley, and Stephen Ambrose, drawing primarily on Army reports and white settler accounts, tended toward military perspectives. (Note: See for instance: Ambrose, Stephen E. Crazy Horse and Custer: The Parallel Lives of Two American Warriors. Garden City, NY: Doubleday, 1975. Hyde, George E. Red Cloud's Folk: A History of the Oglala Sioux Indians. Norman: University of Oklahoma Press, 1937; Hyde, George E. A Sioux Chronicle. Norman: University of Oklahoma Press, 1956; Hyde, George E. Spotted Tail's Folk: A History of the Brule Sioux. Norman: University of Oklahoma Press, 1961; Utley, Robert M. The Last Days of the Sioux Nation. New Haven: Yale University Press, 1963; Utley, Robert M. Frontiersmen in Blue: The United States Army and the Indian, 1848–1865. New York: Macmillan, 1967; Utley, Robert M. Frontier Regulars: The United States Army and the Indian, 1866–1891. New York: Macmillan, 1973; Utley, Robert M. The Lance and the Shield: The Life and Times of Sitting Bull. New York: Henry Holt, 1993)

Lakota and Cheyenne authors—among them John Stands In Timber (1967) and Joseph Marshall III (2005)—subsequently reasserted Indigenous frameworks emphasizing cultural context, spiritual practice, and the authority of oral testimony; these accounts reject the Eurocentric paradigm in favor of worldviews that acknowledge the unseen and treat elder transmission as historically authoritative. Because many key episodes—Crazy Horse's vision, his role at the Little Bighorn, the circumstances of his death—survive in multiple, sometimes contradictory accounts, modern scholarship emphasizes source comparison and the careful separation of verifiable events from later interpretations.

== Memorials ==
=== Memorial sculpture ===
Crazy Horse is commemorated by the incomplete Crazy Horse Memorial in the Black Hills of South Dakota, near the town of Berne—a monument carved from a mountainside, as is the nearby Mount Rushmore National Memorial. The sculpture was begun in 1948 by Polish-American sculptor Korczak Ziółkowski, who had previously worked under Gutzon Borglum on Mount Rushmore; upon completion, it will measure 641 feet (195 m) wide and 563 feet (172 m) high, making it the largest sculpture in the world. Ziółkowski undertook the project at the invitation of Lakota chief Henry Standing Bear, who sought a monument demonstrating that the Native nations also have their heroes; the memorial is funded entirely by private donations, with no federal assistance, and has no target completion date. The 87-foot head of Crazy Horse was completed and dedicated in 1998.

The Crazy Horse Memorial in 2020

The monument has been the subject of controversy. Many Lakota oppose it as a desecration of Thunderhead Mountain—sacred ground situated between Custer and Hill City—and regard the sculpted likeness as incompatible with Crazy Horse's own well-documented aversion to being photographed or monumentalized. Opponents of the monument have likened it to pollution and desecration of the landscape and environment of the Black Hills, and of the ideals of Crazy Horse himself.

=== Other ===
Crazy Horse has two highways named after him, both called the Crazy Horse Memorial Highway. In South Dakota, the designation has been applied to a portion of US 16/US 385 between Custer and Hill City, which passes by the Crazy Horse Memorial. In November 2010, Nebraska Governor Dave Heineman approved designating US 20 from Hay Springs to Fort Robinson in honor of Crazy Horse, capping a year-long effort by citizens of Chadron. The designation may extend east another 100 miles through Cherry County to Valentine.

Crazy Horse was honored by the U.S. Postal Service in 1982 with a 13¢ Great Americans series postage stamp, and the Crazy Horse School in Wanblee, South Dakota is named after him.

=== In popular culture ===
- Anthony Quinn played Crazy Horse in They Died With Their Boots On (1941), directed by Raoul Walsh and starring Errol Flynn as Custer.
- In the film Chief Crazy Horse (1955), directed by George Sherman, Crazy Horse is played by Victor Mature.
- In the film Crazy Horse (1996), Crazy Horse is played by Native American actor Michael Greyeyes.
- The middle-grade novel In the Footsteps of Crazy Horse (2015) by Joseph M. Marshall III tells the story of a young Lakota boy who learns about Crazy Horse from his grandfather.
- Crazy Horse is a major figure the 2016 AMC docu-series The American West, portrayed by Will Strongheart in reenactment scenes.
- The episodes "Descent" and "The Pegasus" of Star Trek: The Next Generation feature a starship named USS Crazy Horse.
- Crazy Horse's life was the subject of a four-part series of the podcast History on Fire by historian Daniele Bolelli.

== Bibliography ==
- Agonito, Joseph (2011). Lakota Portraits: Lives of the Legendary Plains People. Globe Pequot Publishing. ISBN 978-0-76277-212-4.
- Allan, Keith (2026). "The Efficacy of Names and Their Place in the Lexicon". Lingua. 339 (1): 1–15. doi:10.1016/j.lingua.2026.104188.
- Bourke, John G. (1896). On the Border with Crook. New York: Charles Scribner's Sons.
- Bray, Kingsley M. (2011). Crazy Horse: A Lakota Life. University of Oklahoma Press. ISBN 978-0-80618-376-3.
- Bright, William (2004). Native American Place Names in the United States. Norman, Oklahoma: University of Oklahoma Press. ISBN 978-0-80613-576-2.
- Curran, Mike. "Our History". Crazy Horse School.
- Dixon, Mary (2007). "'Crazy Horse: The Strange Man of the Oglalas' by Mari Sandoz: Historiography, a Philosophy for Reconstruction". Great Plains Quarterly. 27 (1): 39–54. JSTOR 23534300.
- DuVal, Kathleen (2024). Native Nations: A Millenium in North America. New York: Random House. ISBN 978-0-52551-103-8.
- Frazier, Ian (1989). Great Plains. New York: Farrar, Straus and Giroux. ISBN 978-0-37421-723-5.
- Gonzalez, Mario; Cook-Lynn, Elizabeth (1998). The Politics of Hallowed Ground: Wounded Knee and the Struggle for Indian Sovereignty. Urbana: University of Illinois Press. ISBN 978-0-25206-669-6.
- Greene, Jerome A. (1993). "Conflict in Dakota Territory: Episodes of the Great Sioux War". South Dakota History. 23 (1): 1–47. ISSN 0361-8676.
- Guttmacher, Peter (1994). North American Indians of Achievement; Crazy Horse: Sioux War Chief. Philadelphia: Chelsea House Publishers. ISBN 978-0-79101-712-8.
- Hardorff, Richard G. (1998). The Surrender and Death of Crazy Horse: A Source Book about a Tragic Episode in Lakota History. Spokane, Washington: Arthur H. Clark Company. ISBN 978-0-87062-283-0.
- Hedges, Chris (July 2, 2012). "A Lesson from Crazy Horse". Truthdig.
- Hedren, Paul L. (2014). "Fort Robinson, Custer, and the Legacy of the Great Sioux War". Nebraska History. 95 (1): 4–13. ISSN 0028-1859.
- Hinman, Eleanor H. (1976). "Oglala Sources on the Life of Crazy Horse" (PDF). Nebraska History. 57 (Spring): 1–51.
- Hyde, George (1974). Spotted Tail's Folk: A History of the Brulé Sioux. Civilization of the American Indian. Vol. 57 (2 ed.). Norman, Oklahoma: University of Oklahoma Press. ISBN 978-0-80611-380-7.
- Jarvis, Brooke (September 16, 2019). "Who Speaks for Crazy Horse?". The New Yorker.
- Kadlecek, Edward; Kadlecek, Mabell (1981). To Kill an Eagle: Indian Views on the Last Days of Crazy Horse. Johnson Books. OCLC 8021008.
- Kane, Randy (2018). "What Did Crazy Horse Look Like?" (PDF). Nebraska History. 99 (Winter): 224–233.
- Keenan, Jerry (1972). "The Wagon Box Fight". Journal of the West. 11 (1): 51–74. ISSN 0022-5169.
- Little, Daniel (2025) [First published 18 February 2007]. "Philosophy of History". Stanford Encyclopedia of Philosophy.
- Lyon, William S. (2012). Spirit Talkers: North American Indian Medicine Powers. Kansas City: Prayer Efficacy Publishing. ISBN 978-0-98485-460-8.
- Marshall, Joseph M. III (2005). The Journey of Crazy Horse: A Lakota History. New York: Penguin. ISBN 978-0-50005-178-8.
- Matson, William; Frethem, Mark (2006). Creation, Spirituality, and the Family Tree (DVD). The Authorized Biography of Crazy Horse and His Family. Vol. 1. Reelcontact.com Productions.
- Matson, William; Frethem, Mark (2007). Defending the Homeland Prior to the 1868 Treaty (DVD). The Authorized Biography of Crazy Horse and His Family. Vol. 2. Reelcontact.com Productions.
- Matson, William B. (2016). Crazy Horse: The Lakota Warrior's Life & Legacy (1st ed.). Layton, Utah: Gibbs Smith. ISBN 978-1-4236-4123-0.
- McCreight, Major Israel; Flying Hawk (1947). Firewater and Forked Tongues: A Sioux Chief Interprets U.S. History. Pasadena, California: Trail's End Publishing. OCLC 35423840.
- McMurtry, Larry (1999). Crazy Horse. New York: Viking. ISBN 0-7865-0679-2.
- Miller, Susan A. (2008). "Native America Writes Back: The Origin of the Indigenous Paradigm in Historiography". Wíčazo Ša Review. 23 (2): 9–28. doi:10.1353/wic.0.0013. JSTOR 30131259.
- Neihardt, John (2014). Black Elk Speaks; The Complete Edition. University of Nebraska Press. ISBN 978-0-80328-391-6.
- Newton, Nell Jessup (1995). "Memory and Misrepresentation: Representing Crazy Horse in Tribal Court". Connecticut Law Review. 27 (3): 1003.
- Powers, Thomas (2010). The Killing of Crazy Horse. New York: Alfred A. Knopf. ISBN 978-0-30759-451-8.
- Rand, Martin III (June 11, 2012). "A memorial for Crazy Horse 64 years in the making ... so far". CNN. Archived from the original on March 21, 2020.
- Rempp, Kerri (November 17, 2010). "Nebraska highway to be named for Lakota leader". Rapid City Journal.
- Ricker, Eli S. (2005). Jensen, Richard E. (ed.). Voices of the American West, Volume 1: The Indian Interviews of Eli S. Ricker, 1903–1919. Lincoln: University of Nebraska Press. ISBN 978-0-80323-949-4.
- Sajna, Mike (2000). Crazy Horse: The Life Behind the Legend. New York: John Wiley & Sons. ISBN 978-0-78582-036-9.
- Salter Reynolds, Susan (December 26, 2010). "Book Review: 'The Killing of Crazy Horse' by Thomas Powers". Los Angeles Times.
- Smithsonian National Postal Museum. "Crazy Horse 13¢ stamp". Smithsonian Institution.
