= Redshirt =

Redshirt, Red Shirt, or Redshirts may refer to:

== Sports ==
- Redshirt (college sports), delaying a college athlete's participation to lengthen eligibility

== Entertainment ==
- Redshirt (stock character), originally derived from Star Trek, a stock character who dies soon after being introduced
- Red Shirts (film), a 1952 film about Anita Garibaldi by Franco Rossi
- Redshirts (novel), a 2012 novel by John Scalzi
- "Redshirts" (song), a 2012 song by Jonathan Coulton
- Redshirt (video game), a 2013 video game by Mitu Khandaker

== Places ==
- Red Shirt Lake, a lake in Alaska
- Red Shirt, South Dakota, a Lakota village in South Dakota
- Red Shirt Table, a table mountain in South Dakota

== Politics ==
- Khudai Khidmatgar or Red Shirts, a Pashtun movement against British rule in colonial India
- Redshirts (Italy), followers of guerrilla leader Giuseppe Garibaldi
- Red Shirts (Mexico), a Mexican anti-Catholic paramilitary organization of the 1930s
- Abahlali baseMjondolo or Red shirts, a South African shack-dwellers' movement
- The red shirts scandal, an Australian political scandal that involved the Victorian Labor Party
- Red Shirts (Taiwan) or Million Voices Against Corruption, President Chen Must Go
- Red Shirts (Thailand), a political movement in Thailand opposing the 2006 military coup
- Red Shirts (United States), a militant white supremacist group during and after the Reconstruction Era

== People ==
- Red Shirt (Oglala) (1847–1925), chief of the Oglala Sioux tribe
- Delphine Red Shirt (born 1957), Oglala Lakota Sioux writer

== Other uses ==
- Red Shirt School of Photography, a trend pioneered by National Geographic photographers

== See also ==
- Redshirting (academic), the practice of postponing entrance into kindergarten
- Kuilix, Pend d'Oreilles tribal war leader
- Lalkurti (literal translation: Red Shirt), a locality in Rawalpindi cantonment in Pakistan
