= Ghost Dance War =

Armed conflict in South Dakota (1890–1891)

- Part of the Sioux Wars
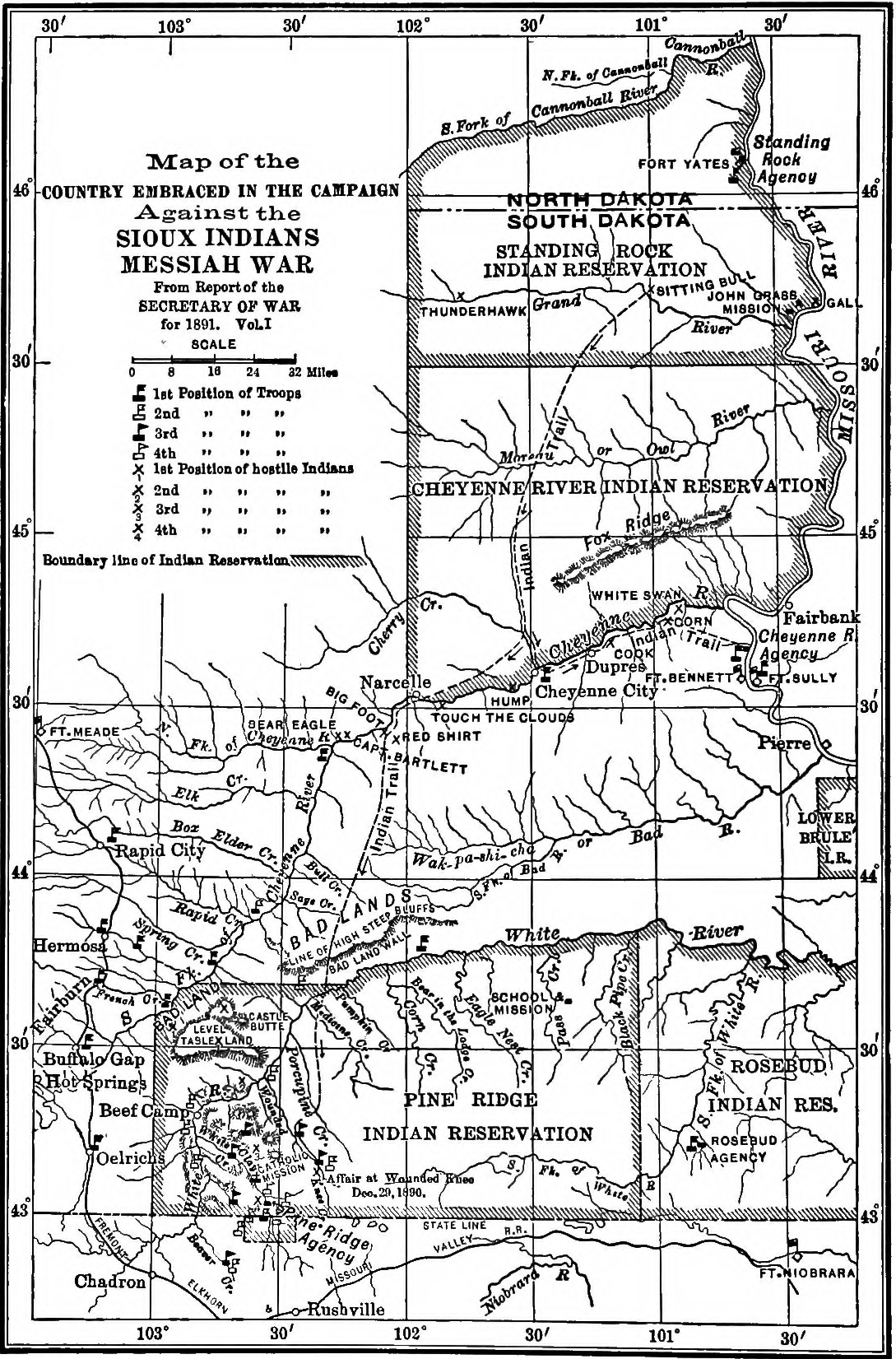
- "Map of the country embraced in the campaign against the Sioux Indians Messiah War" (1905)
Date	December 29, 1890 – January 15, 1891
Location	South Dakota
Result	United States victory

Belligerents
United States	Miniconjou Lakota; Hunkpapa Lakota

Commanders and leaders
(United States) Nelson A. Miles; (United States) James McLaughlin; (United States) James W. Forsyth	Spotted Elk †; Sitting Bull †; Kicking Bear; Short Bull

Casualties and losses
c. 25–50 killed; 39 wounded	c. 300 killed; 51 wounded
- Native American losses include civilian casualties.

The Ghost Dance War was the military reaction of the United States government against the spread of the Ghost Dance movement on Lakota Sioux reservations in 1890 and 1891. The United States Army designation for this conflict was Pine Ridge Campaign. White settlers called it the Messiah War. Lakota Sioux reservations were occupied by the US Army, causing fear, confusion, and resistance among the Lakota. It resulted in the Wounded Knee Massacre wherein the 7th Cavalry killed over 250 Lakota, primarily unarmed women, children, and elders, at Wounded Knee on December 29, 1890; as a recognition for surviving an ambush, the US government awarded the Medal of Honor to 20 US soldiers. The end of the Ghost Dance War is usually dated January 15, 1891, when Lakota Ghost-Dancing leader Kicking Bear decided to meet with US officials. However, the US government continued to use the threat of violence to suppress the Ghost Dance at the Pine Ridge, Rosebud, Cheyenne River, and Standing Rock reservations.

== Ghost Dance ==
The Ghost Dance ceremony began as part of a Native American religious movement in 1889. It was initiated by the Paiute religious leader Wovoka, after a vision in which Wovoka said Wakan Tanka (Lakota orthography: Wakȟáŋ Tȟáŋka, usually translated as Great Spirit) spoke to him and told him directly that the ghost of Native American ancestors would come back to live in peace with the remaining Native Americans for the rest of eternity, and that practicing the ghost dances would hasten the arrival of these events. It was also believed that shirts worn during these ritualistic dances would protect the wearer from bullets. The Sioux also believed that a series of devastating natural disasters would occur, which would wipe out all white people while Native Americans would be protected. This religious movement quickly spread by Native Americans throughout the continent and most western reservations, including Lakota reservations in South Dakota. Sitting Bull allowed Kicking Bear to preach and teach the dance at Standing Rock. At the same time, the religion was also preached by Short Bull to the Brulé at Rosebud and embraced by Spotted Elk at Cheyenne River, and by Red Cloud at Pine Ridge. This started the push to bring US troops into the Dakotas.

== Civilian militia ==
Merritt H. Day organized a militia called the Spring Creek Volunteers in the southern Black Hills during what settlers then called Messiah War or the Sioux Uprising, but is now called the Ghost Dance War.

The Last Days of the Sioux Nation described the original group as "sixty-two ranchers and cowboys mustered by Col. H. M. [sic] Day into the South Dakota militia...spoiling for a fight." U.S. Army officers in the area corresponded with "Col. M. H. Day" and dictated their area of patrol.

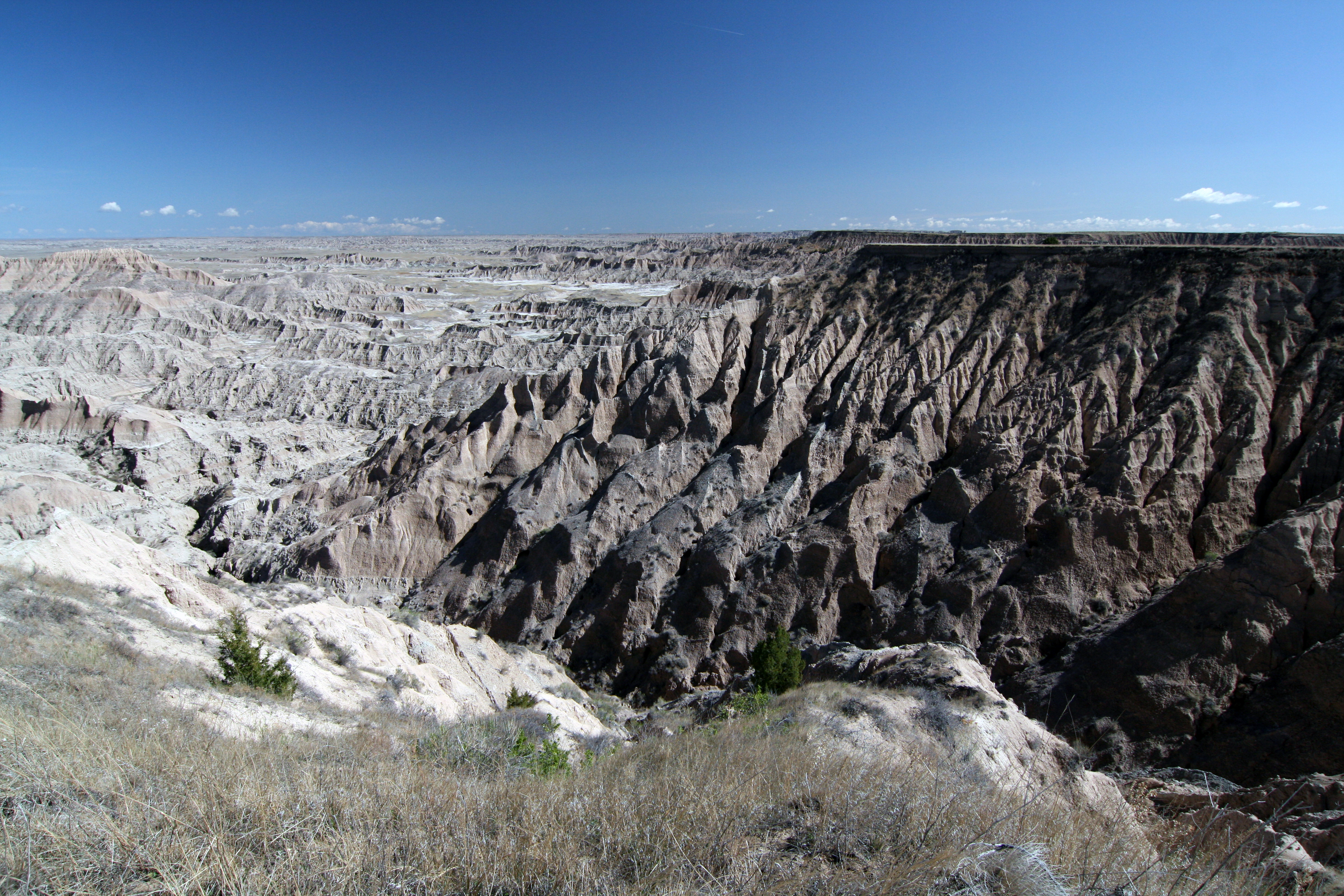
Members of Day's militia instigated an attack on a Lakota settlement of approximately 100 tepees in an encampment below Stronghold Table in what is now Badlands National Park

Gov. Arthur C. Mellette sent Day one hundred rifles and 5,000 cartridges for those guns on December 6, 1890. Mellette appointed Day "aide-de-camp" responsible for the "[Black] Hills campaign" and asked him to coordinate with the mayor of Rapid City. After Sitting Bull was shot and killed, Mellette sent Day another 200 rifles and 7,000 cartridges.

Men of the Dakota Militia are estimated to have killed between 12 and 18 Lakota in mid-December 1890, "kinsmen, brothers, or sons of the Lakota seeking refuge on Stronghold." The Dakota Militia's actions were a significant precipitating factor in the confrontation that culminated in the Wounded Knee massacre.

By January 1891, following Wounded Knee, the militia under Day had expanded to some 200 men who "patrolled Cheyenne River as a screen for the Black Hills settlements."

Day resigned his position as colonel of the militia in a telegram to Gov. Mellette on July 8, 1891.

In 1940, U.S. Senator Francis H. Case of South Dakota sought military pensions for the Spring Creek Company of volunteers led by Day. It seems the War Department's position was that the company were not formally mustered, had never drawn pay, and Day was never commissioned as a colonel. Case presented communications to Day from U.S. Army Major General Nelson A. Miles, Colonel Eugene Asa Carr, Lieutenant Colonel R.H. Offley and Major Harry C. Egbert, all addressing him as colonel. It appears the Governor did not have legally invested authority to raise any units of the state militia but that Day's unit was raised under other emergency powers, which meant he had no authority to pay them. They received arms and ammunition from the regular army but were not under any formal standing with them. General Frank T. Hines of the U.S. Department of Veterans Affairs stated at the time of the hearing that he accepted the company had existed and cooperated with the army but that current legislation meant he could not pay pensions to the men as they drew no pay from the federal government or state, though he felt they were morally entitled to a pension.

== War ==
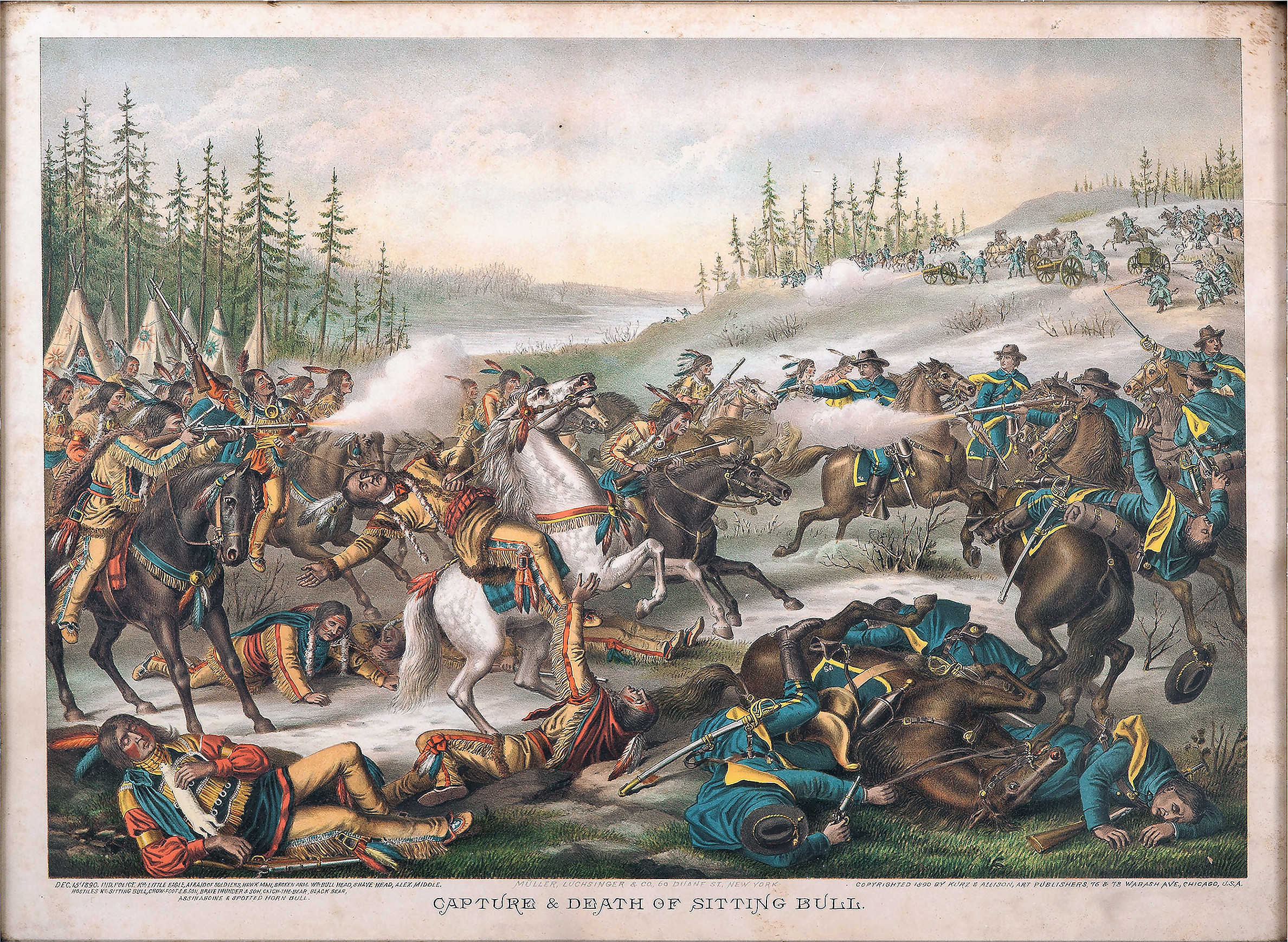
Sitting Bull was killed in a shootout between Indian police and Lakota on December 15, 1890, at Standing Rock Reservation.

In the winter of 1890, the Lakota had been beset by a series of violations of the Fort Laramie Treaty of 1851 by the US involving land divisions among tribes in South Dakota. Furthermore, railroads, such as the Fremont, Elkhorn and Missouri Valley Railroad and the Deadwood Central Railroad (later purchased by Chicago, Burlington & Quincy) were being built near or through traditional Sioux lands. There was also a dispute around the Black Hills land, where gold was found in 1874, resulting in the Black Hills Gold Rush. In April 1890, General Thomas H. Ruger, commander of the Department of Dakota, ordered the 8th Cavalry to establish a camp along the Cheyenne River in order to observe the Miniconjou band led by Spotted Elk, living just outside the Cheyenne River Indian Reservation in a small village they had built. Reports from the 8th Cavalry show that between April and August 1890, the relationship between the soldiers and the Lakota was cordial and that the band was "peaceably disposed and have committed no depredations on the settlers of Meade County".

=== Standing Rock reservation ===
The Standing Rock reservation also became a key point in the Ghost Dance movement. John M. Carignan, a Standing Rock school teacher, had reported that by October 1890, the number of his students had dwindled from 60 to just 3, saying that parents were pulling their children out of school to participate in the Ghost Dance. On December 14, 1890, US Indian agent James McLaughlin drafted a letter to Lieutenant Henry Bullhead, an Indian agency policeman, that included instructions and a plan to capture Sitting Bull. The plan called for the arrest to take place at dawn on December 15 and advised the use of a light spring wagon to facilitate removal before his followers could rally. Bullhead decided against using the wagon. He intended to have the police officers force Sitting Bull to mount a horse immediately after the arrest.

The next morning, Indian police surrounded Sitting Bull's home before arresting him. Sitting Bull and his wife noisily protested in order to stall for time, which caused a crowd to converge on the scene. After Bullhead used force to get Sitting Bull to mount a horse, Catch-the-Bear, a Lakota man, shot Bullhead. Bullhead and another police officer reacted by shooting Sitting Bull, killing him instantly. A shoot out erupted between the two sides, killing six policemen and seven Lakota. Two policemen, including Bullhead, died from wounds shortly after the fight.

=== Pine Ridge reservation ===
Lieutenant colonel Edwin Sumner of the 8th Cavalry was ordered to escort Spotted Elk and his band into Camp Cheyenne. Spotted Elk said he would surrender the next day, with which Sumner agreed. Spotted Elk instead led his band to the Pine Ridge Reservation. On December 28, Spotted Elk and his band were eventually apprehended by the 7th Cavalry while en route to Pine Ridge. Major Samuel Whitside wanted to disarm the band immediately. However, his interpreter convinced him that this would lead to a shootout and advised him to instead take the band to make camp at nearby Wounded Knee and disarm them the next day instead. The next morning, the attempt to disarm Spotted Elk's band resulted in the Wounded Knee Massacre. One deaf Lakota did not give up his weapon, possibly due to the US troops not knowing how to communicate with the deaf Lakota. His gun was discharged when he was seized by US soldiers, at which point other Lakota began shooting at the soldiers. One of the US commanders heard this and ordered his troops to open fire. The commanders called in reinforcements from the Hotchkiss cannons previously placed on the adjacent ridge, which mowed down everyone in range. By the time the smoke had cleared, between 150 and 300 Lakota (mostly women and children) had been killed. Another 25 dead and 45 injured US troops lay on the ground. As this was happening, a blizzard came in, preventing the US troops or the other Lakota from the Pine Ridge Reservation from retrieving their dead. This resulted in frozen dead bodies strewn across Wounded Knee Creek for the next three days.

There was a public uproar when word of the gunfire reached the eastern US. The US government re-established the treaty they had broken with the Lakota to avoid further public backlash.

== Aftermath ==
Much to the dismay of many Native Americans, twenty US troops were awarded the Medal of Honor for their actions at Wounded Knee. Some Native Americans have pushed to get these medals rescinded.

In more recent years, there have been takeovers of the Wounded Knee Memorial by militant protesters, both to remind the nation of this incident and to protest government treatment of Native Americans. The American Indian Movement (AIM) occupied the Pine Ridge Reservation near Wounded Knee in protest against the federal government from February 27 through May 8, 1973. Several people died or went missing during this 71-day standoff between federal authorities and Native American activists.
