= Red Shirt (Oglala) =

Oglala Lakota chief, warrior, and statesman (c.1847–1925)

- Ógle Šá
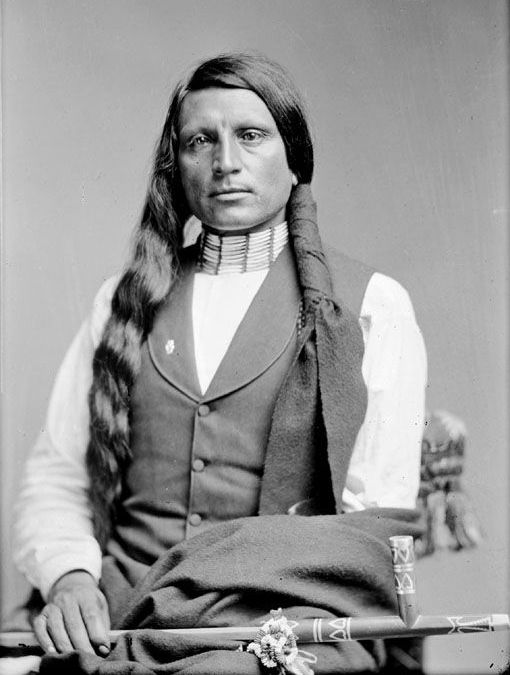
- Chief Red Shirt

Oglala Lakota leader

Personal details
- Born: c. 1847 near Fort Fetterman, Wyoming
- Died: January 4, 1925 Pine Ridge Reservation, South Dakota
- Spouse: Julia In Sight
- Children: Annie Red Shirt, William Red Shirt, Casey Red Shirt
- Known for: Oglala chief, warrior and statesman. Served on peace delegations, international celebrity with Buffalo Bill's Wild West.

Red Shirt (Lakota: Ógle Šá; c. 1847 – January 4, 1925) was an Oglala Lakota chief, warrior and statesman. Red Shirt supported Crazy Horse during the Great Sioux War of 1876-1877 and the Ghost Dance Movement of 1890, and was a Lakota delegate to Washington in 1880. Red Shirt surrendered with Crazy Horse in 1877. After the surrender he moved to an area that is now known as Red Shirt, SD. Red Shirt was one of the first Wild Westers with Buffalo Bill's Wild West and a supporter of the Carlisle Native Industrial School. Red Shirt became an international celebrity Wild Westing with Buffalo Bill's Wild West and his 1887 appearance in England captured the attention of Europeans and presented a progressive image of Native Americans.

== Early life ==
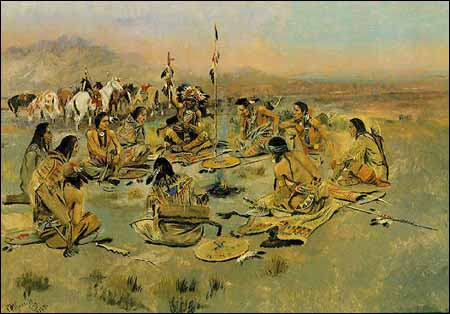
Intertribal warfare

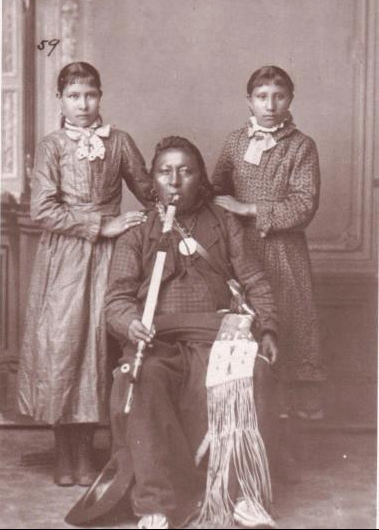
Chief Red Dog and daughters, Carlisle, PA.

Red Shirt was born near Fort Fetterman, Wyoming. There are several accounts of Red Shirt's early life. One account is that Red Shirt is the son of a white man and a Lakota mother. Another account, by Red Shirt, is that he was the son of a great warrior chief. Will Rogers reported that Red Shirt was the son of Red Dog, a progressive headman of the Oyuhpe band who settled at Pine Ridge, South Dakota. Red Shirt and Red Dog were Lakota delegates to Washington in 1880, served as Pine Ridge Indian Police and sent their children to the Carlisle Indian Industrial School in Carlisle, Pennsylvania. Historians agree that by 1877 Red Shirt had emerged as a leader of the Wagluhe at Pine Ridge.

In 1880, Red Shirt traveled to the Carlisle Indian Industrial School with Red Cloud and Red Dog and on to Washington D.C. as a Lakota delegate.

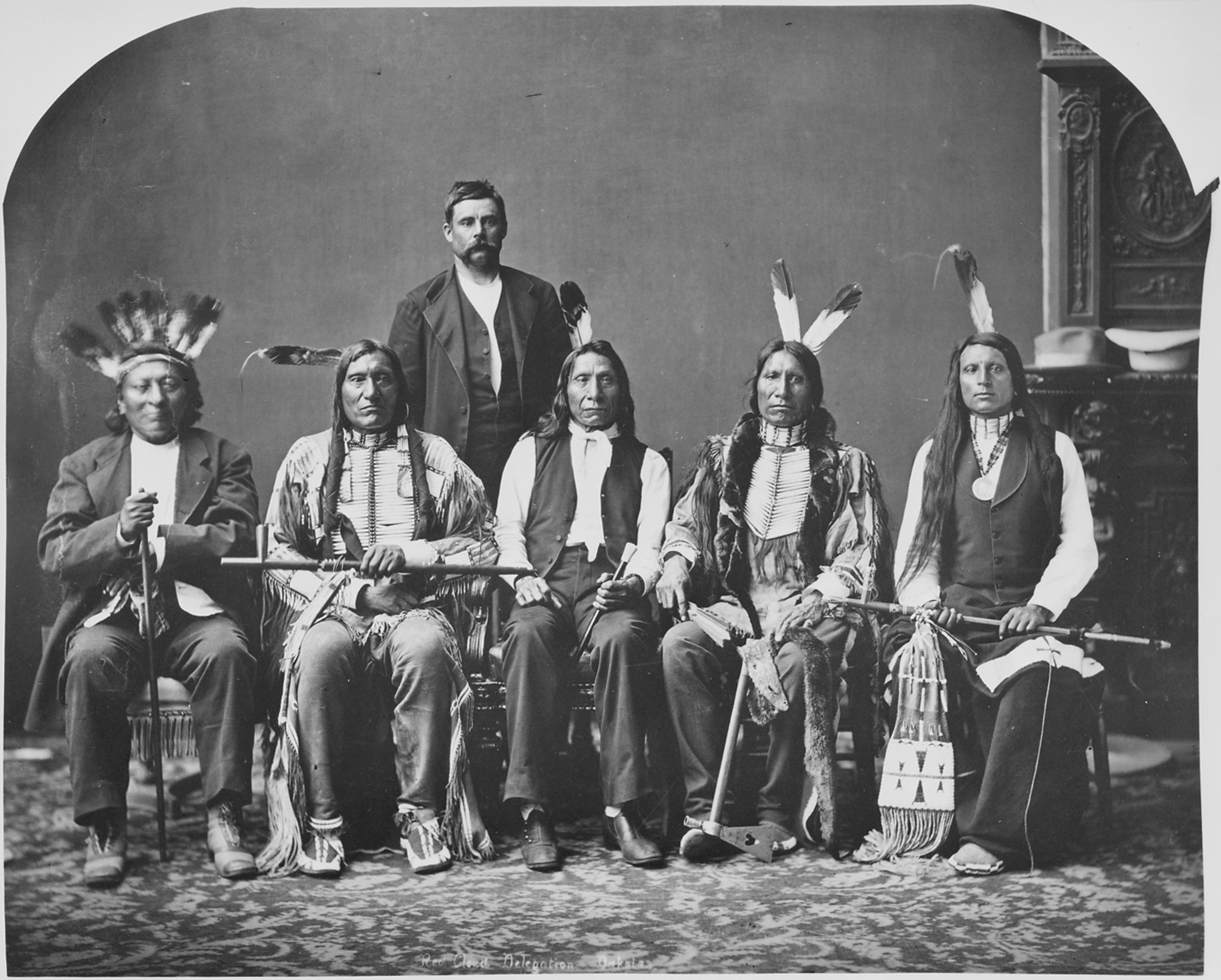
Dakota delegation to Washington, D.C., Left to right, Red Dog, Little Wound, John Bridgeman (interpreter), Red Cloud, American Horse and Red Shirt. June, 1880

== Warrior ==
Chief Red Shirt camped with Crazy Horse and the rest of the Oglala at the Little Big Horn. The Oglala camp was next to the Cheyenne camp near the bottom of what is now known as Last Stand Hill. Chief Red Shirt wore his hair to represent peace and war. One side of his hair was wrapped to indicate he was ready for peace, the other side was worn loose indicating his readiness for war. This was done when he traveled with Chief Red Cloud to Washington D.C. Most of Red Shirt's history has been written down. Living family members of his tell of his bravery in battle. Buffalo Bill Cody was impressed with Red Shirt. “Among the prominent chiefs thus engaged was Red Shirt, a redoubtable warrior and second only in influence to Sitting Bull himself. A short while before his engagement with us he had quelled an uprising among his people, instigated by a pretender to the chieftainship of the tribe, by invading the pretender's camp with only two of his followers and shooting the leader dead before the eyes of his affrighted wife. This fearless act had served to elevate him very much in the eyes of his people, who thereafter accepted him as a leader. When, therefore, he decided to join the Wild West show, under the flattering offers I made him, his influence aided us very much in procuring our complement of Indians, not only from his own tribe, but from others as well.”

== Carlisle Indian Industrial School ==
It has been said that In 1879, Red Shirt, along with Blue Horse and American Horse, enrolled their children in the first class at Carlisle Indian Industrial School in Carlisle, Pennsylvania. However, a search in Carlisle Indian School records indicate that no Red Shirt children ever attended Carlisle Indian School. Red Shirt did visit Carlisle, but only as a visitor and never enrolled his children there.

"Those first Sioux children who came to Carlisle could not have been happy there. But it was their only chance for a future." Wild Westing and the Carlisle Indian School were portals to education, opportunity and hope, and came at a time when the Lakota people were depressed, impoverished, harassed and confined. Many Wild Westers from Pine Ridge enrolled their children at the Carlisle Native Industrial School from its beginning in 1879 until its closure in 1918.

== Wild Westing ==
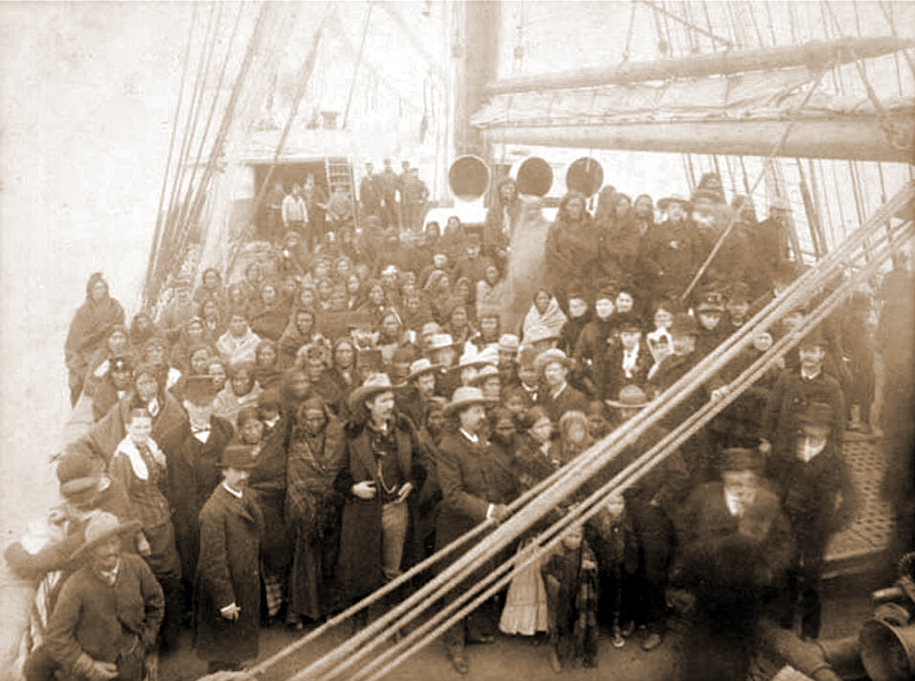
On March 31, 1887, Chief Blue Horse, Chief American Horse and Chief Red Shirt and their families boarded the S.S. State of Nebraska in New York City, and began a new journey for the Lakota people when they crossed the sea to England with Buffalo Bill to perform at the Golden Jubilee of Queen Victoria.

On March 31, 1887, Chief Red Shirt, Chief Blue Horse and Chief American Horse and their families boarded the SS State of Nebraska in New York City, leading a new journey for the Lakota people when they crossed the ocean to England on Buffalo Bill's first international to perform at the Golden Jubilee of Queen Victoria and tour through Birmingham, Salford and London over a five–month period. The entourage consisted of 97 Indians, 18 buffaloes, 2 deer, 10 elk, 10 mules, 5 Texas steers, 4 donkeys, and 108 horses. Buffalo Bill treated Native American employees as equals with white cowboys. Wild Westers received good wages, transportation, housing, abundant food and gifts of clothing and cash from Buffalo Bill at the end of each season. Wild Westers were employed as performers, interpreters and recruiters. Men had money in their pockets and for their families on the reservation. Female performers were paid extra for infants and children and supplemented wages by making and selling Lakota crafts. Shows hired venerable elder male Natives to appear in the parades to ensure that young men acted with consideration and politeness when visiting host communities, and rules were self-policed by traditional Oglala Lakota chiefs and former U.S. Army Native Scouts. Known as “Show Natives”, Oglala Wild Westers referred to themselves as "Oskate Wicasa" or "Show Man", a title of great honor and respect. Since 1887, Wild Westing has been family tradition with several hundred Pine Ridge families, and the tradition of the Wild Wester community is not unlike the tradition of circus families and communities.

== Crossing the ocean ==
Before starting on the trip to England in 1887, several of the Indians expressed grave fears that the great waters soon overtake them and bring a horrible death. Red Shirt explained that these fears were caused by a belief prevalent among many tribes of Natives, that if a red man attempted to cross the ocean, soon after beginning his journey he would be seized of a malady that would first prostrate the victim, and then slowly consume his flesh day after day, until at length the very skin itself would drop from his bones, leaving nothing but the skeleton and this even could never find burial. On the day following the departure from New York, the Indians began to grow weary and their stomachs became both treacherous and rebellious. Their fears were now so greatly intensified that even Red Shirt, the bravest of his people, began to feel his flesh to see if it were really diminishing. Buffalo Bill, "used his utmost endeavors to cheer them up and relieve their forebodings. But for two days nearly the whole company was too sick for any other active service than feeding the fishes, in which I am not proud to say that I performed more than an ordinary share. On the third day, however, we all began to mend so far that I called the Natives together in the main saloon and gave them a Sunday address, as did also Red Shirt, who was now recovered from his anxiety about the future.

== Red Shirt in England ==
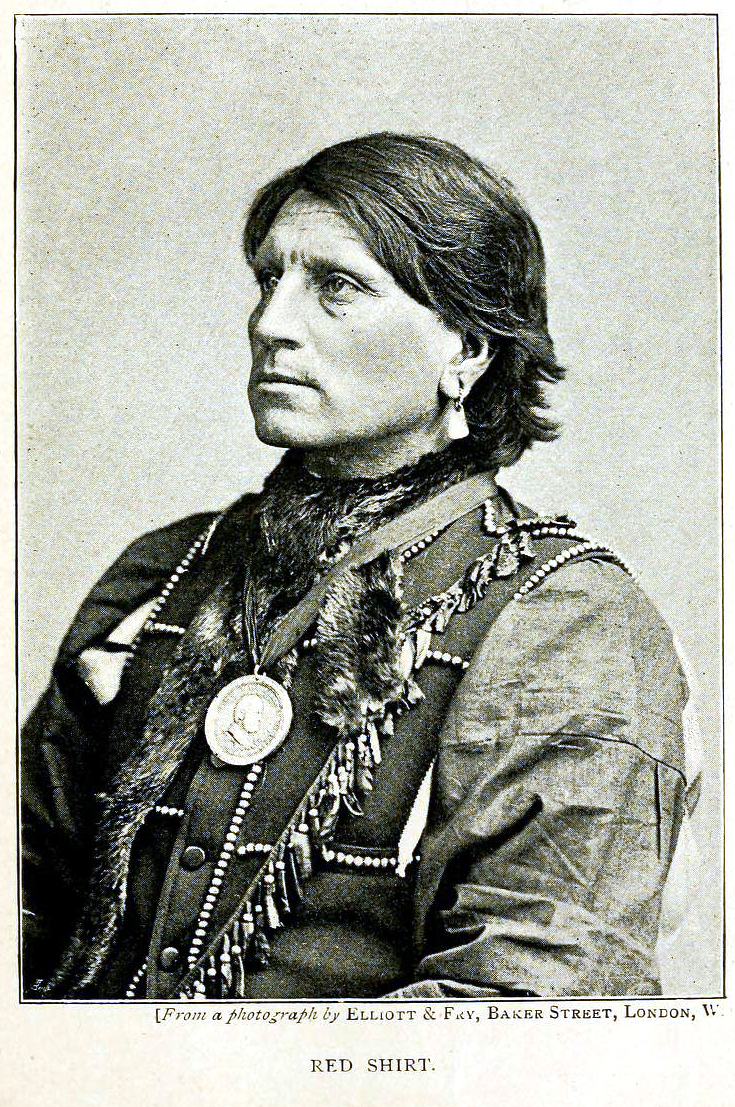
Red Shirt was lionized by the British press and his handsome features and stately bearing caused reporters to hang on his every word.

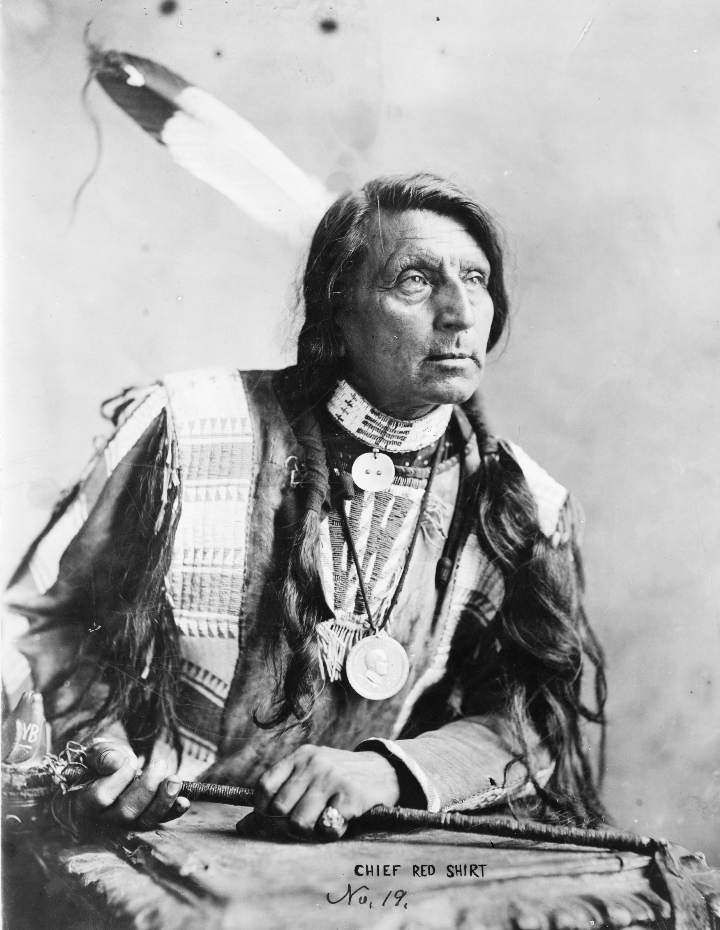
Chief Red Shirt was a Wild Wester for over thirty years. Chief Red Shirt, St. Louis World's Fair, 1904.

Chief Red Shirt was lionized by the British press and photographed by reporters wherever he went. His handsome features and stately bearing caused reporters to hang on his every word and he became the most quoted Wild Wester celebrity of Cody’s trip to England. Red Shirt explained to a reporter from Sheffield: “I started from my lodge two moons ago knowing nothing, and had I remained on the Native Reservations, I should have been as a blind man. Now I can see a new dawn. I have seen the great houses (ships) which cross the mighty waters, the great villages which have no end where the pale faces swarm like insects in the summer sun. Our people will wonder at these things when we return to the Native Reservation and tell them what we have seen.”

=== Statesman ===
Red Shirt adopted a show business persona and proved to be a statesman. Red Shirt presented an image of Native Americans that Europeans could associate with progress, nobility, and civilization. Queen Victoria adored Chief Red Shirt and requested a special command performance. Red Shirt commented to The Brisbane Courier on the future of Natives in the United States. "The red man is changing in every season. The Native of the next generation will not be the Native of the last. Our buffaloes are nearly all gone, the deer have entirely vanished, and the white man takes more and more of our land. But the United States government is good. True, it has taken away our land, and the white man have eaten up our deer and our buffalo, but the government now gives us food that we may not starve. They are educating our children and teaching them to use farm implements. Our children will learn the white man’s civilization and to live like him. It is our only outlook in the future. Now we are dependent upon the rations of the Government but we feel we are fully entitled to that bounty. It is a part of the price they pay for the land they have taken from us, and some compensation to us for having killed off the herds upon which we subsisted. For myself, I know it is no use fighting against the United States government. I accept my fate. The red man cannot kill all the white men that live in villages as big as the largest forests. But some of our young men do not know this, and they may perhaps elect to die like their fathers with their tomahawks in their hands rather than starve to death like a dog upon the prairie."

=== Visitors to Earl’s Court ===
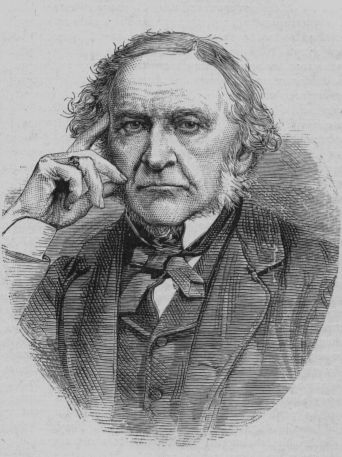
William Ewart Gladstone. "When I saw the great White Chief I thought he was a great man. When I heard him speak, then I felt sure he was a great man." Chief Red Shirt

The royal party inspected the Indian encampment after a performance and Prince Albert Edward had an extended conversation with Red Shirt. Princess Alexandra, through an interpreter, welcomed Chief Red Shirt and other Wild Westers to England. The chief, with great dignity, responded: "Tell the Great White Chief 's wife that it gladdens my heart to hear her words." On April 28, 1887, William Ewart Gladstone, former Prime Minister and current leader of the opposition party in Parliament, toured the Wild West show grounds with his wife at Earl's Court and spoke at length with Red Shirt. Red Shirt was impressed with Gladstone.

“When I saw the great White Chief I thought he was a great man. When I heard him speak, then I felt sure he was a great man. But the White Chief is not as the big men in our tribes. He wore no plumes and no decorations. He had none of his young men (warriors) with him, and only that I heard him talk he would have been to me as other white men. But my brother Mr. Gladstone came to see me in my lodge as a friend, and I was glad to see the White Chief, for though my tongue was tied in his presence my heart was in full friendship. After he went away they told me that half of his great nation of white men have adopted him as their chief. If he were not both good and wise, so many young men of his nation would have never taken him for their leader.”

=== Grandmother England ===
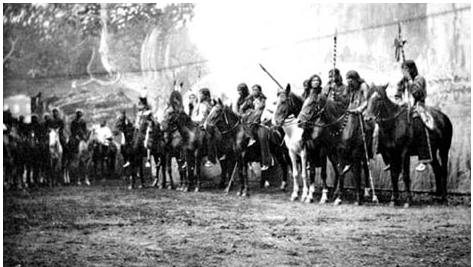
Buffalo Bill and Indians, Salford, England, 1887

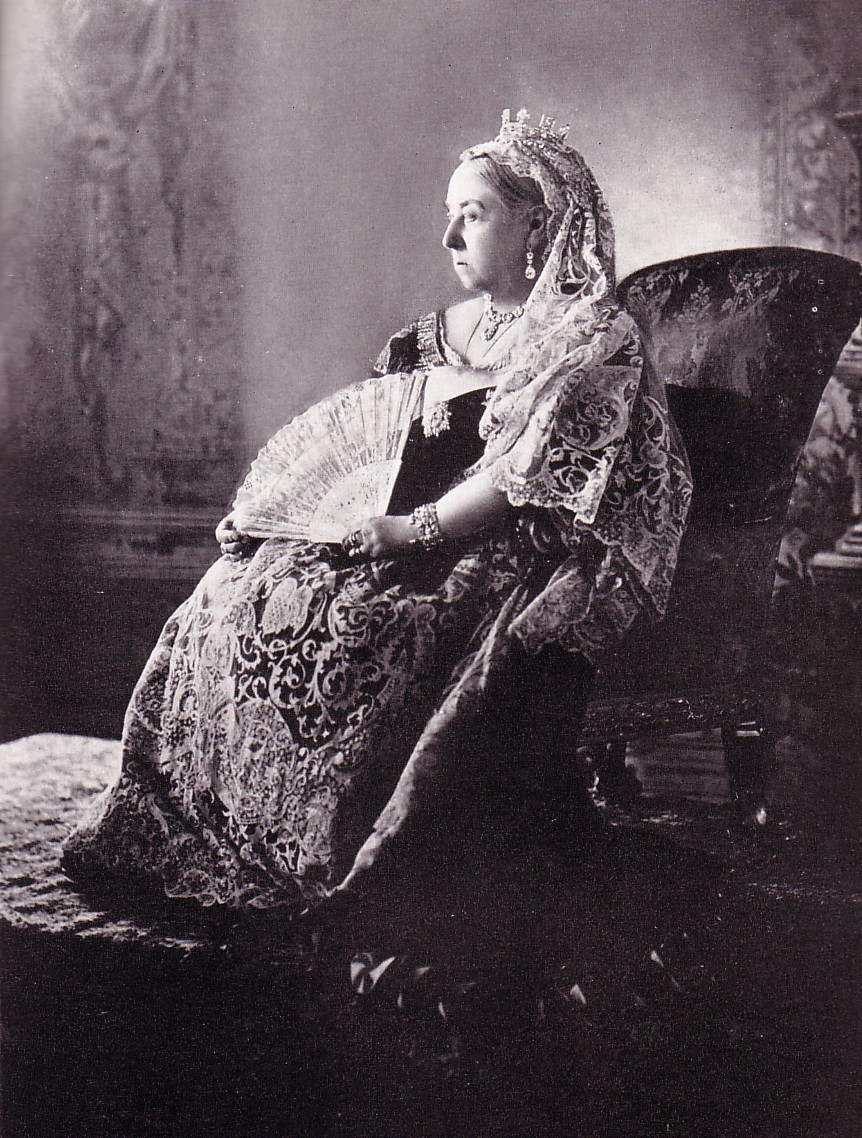
Queen Victoria adored Chief Red Shirt.

On May 9, 1887, Buffalo Bill's Wild West opened in London. Among the audience members was Queen Victoria, who visited the Earl's Court encampment three days later. Black Elk recalled that Natives were told "that Majesty was coming. I did not know what that was at first, but I learned afterward. It was Grandmother England who owned Grandmother's Land where we lived awhile after the Wasichus murdered Crazy Horse." Red Shirt expressed his pleasure in meeting the Queen and remarked to her that "I have come many thousands of miles to see you. Now that I have seen you, my heart is glad." The encounter and his words were widely circulated among the press and noted in her diary. Since the death of Prince Albert, her husband, which event had occurred thirty years previous to this "command," the queen had been more than ordinarily seclusive. She seldom appeared before great assemblages of her subjects and her visits to even her parliament were rare. To theatrical performances she never went during that long period of her mourning. Her latest knowledge of the greatest actors and actresses of the time was gained by private performances given, by command, in her court, and these were infrequent. "The Wild West was altogether too big a thing to take to Windsor Castle, and as in the case of Mahomet and the mountain, as the Wild West could not go to the Queen it became absolutely necessary for the Queen to go to the Wild West, if she desired to see it, and it was evident that she did." "Then I presented Red Shirt, the Native Chieftain, who was gorgeous in war paint and feather trappings. His proud bearing was fetching among the royal party, and when he spoke through an interpreter, saying he had come a long way to see her Majesty and "felt glad," the Queen smiled appreciatively, and as the red man, unconventionally, but proudly, strolled away with the dignity of a Supreme Court Judge, she seemed to say, "I know a real prince when I see him." "Every act went with a rush and a cheer, and was received by cries of 'bravo,' 'well done,' etc. At the close of the exhibition calls were made for Red Shirt and myself, in response to which I thanked my patrons and assured them that the recollection of that evening's display of kindness would ever be fresh in my memory. Cries of 'Bravo, Bill,' and the singing of 'For he's a jolly good fellow' by the entire audience brought the demonstration to a close."

=== Goethe's Faust ===
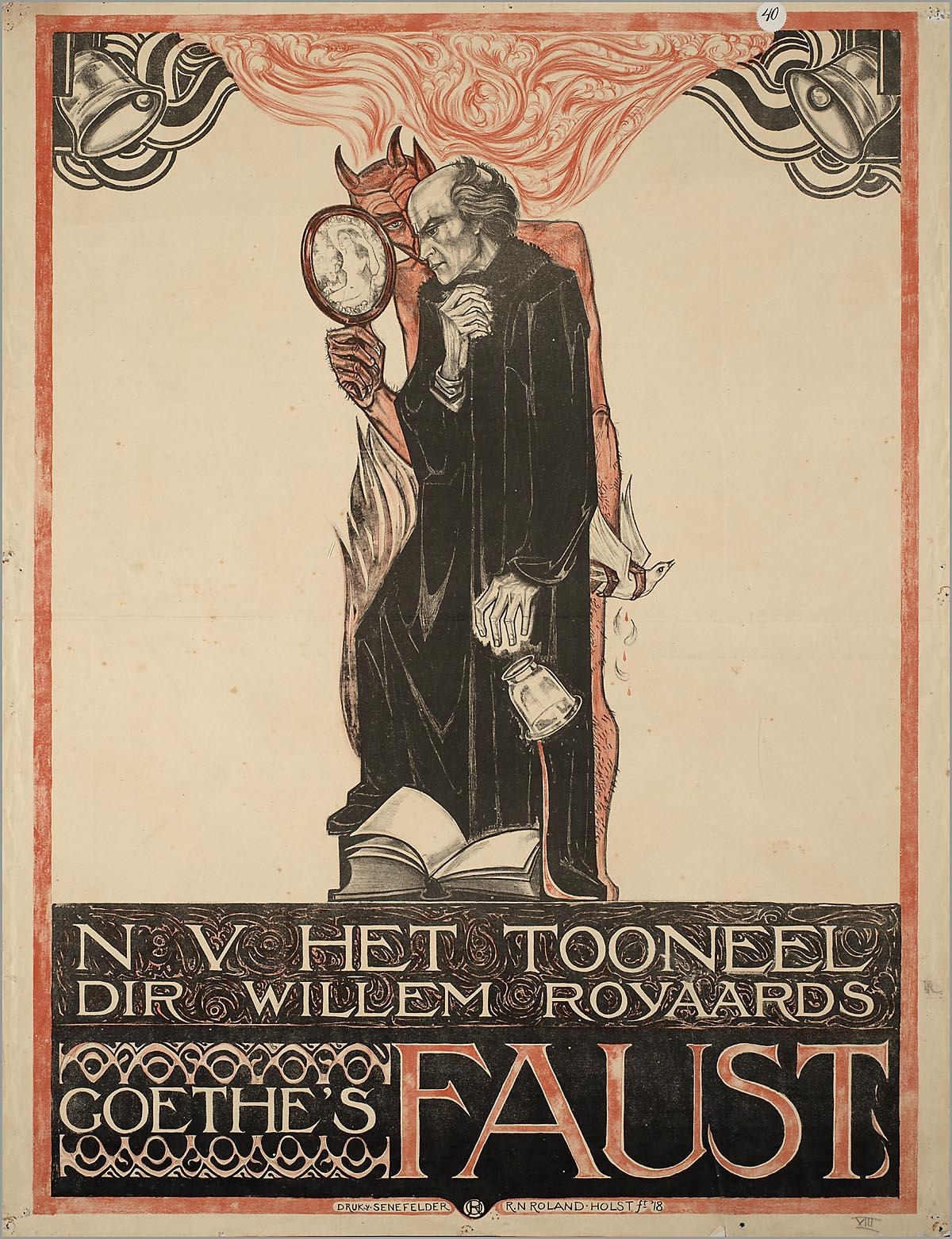
The Sioux, who did not believe in a hell, took the fantastic scenes of Hades in Goethe's Faust, according to their interpreter, “for what it’s worth,” a Wasichu’s dream.

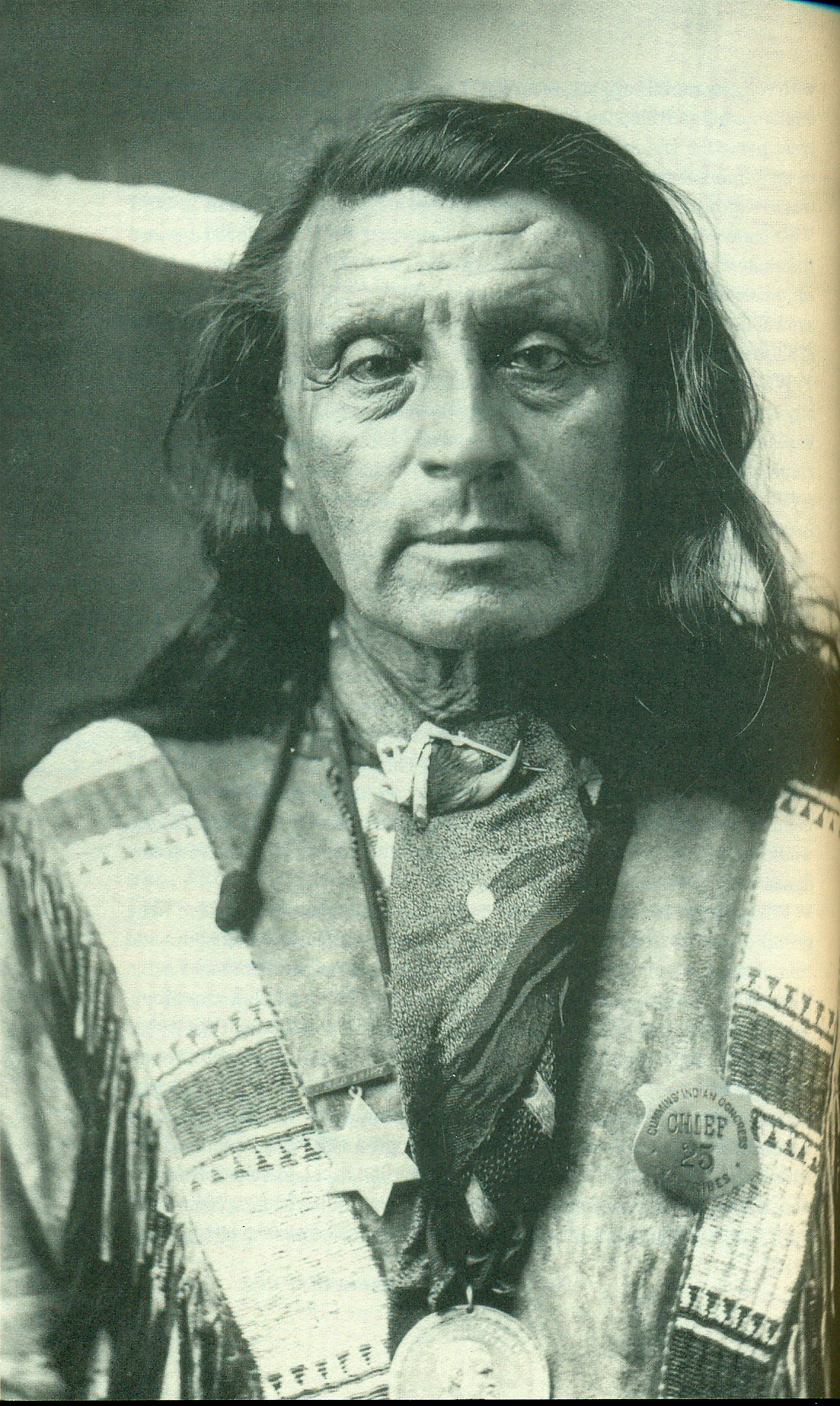
Red Shirt wearing a President Grant Native Peace Medal and badge No. 25 identifying him as a Chief in Cummins's "Native Congress of Forty-eight Tribes." Cummins's Native Congresses appeared at worlds' fairs and international expositions from the 1890s through the Panama-Pacific Exposition in San Francisco in 1915.

Shortly after arriving in London, Cody took some of his Wild Westers to see Sir Henry Irving's production of Goethe's Faust at the Lyceum Theater. The London Times reported that the Sioux were greatly frightened by its horror. In the premier theater of London, Red Shirt, considered the "Chief of the Show Natives by the press, was seated in the royal box suggesting an aura of nobility for the cowboys and Natives in attendance. Irving used the occasion to his own advantage, inviting the performers onstage after the show. Irving remarked to the theatrical paper Era that it was novel to "see Native chiefs in the full panoply of war–paint, holding the scalp–fringed banner in one hand and eating sugar plums with the other." Red Shirt remarked that the show reminded him of a dream. The Sioux, who did not believe in a hell, took the fantastic scenes of Hades, according to their interpreter, “for what it’s worth,” a Wasichu’s dream.

=== Vision at Westminster Abbey ===
"The white man’s lodges for the Great Spirit, whose pinnacles reach the sky, and which have stood for more seasons than the red man reckon, all struck me with terrible wonder. And the Great Spirit speaks to me sometimes since I have been here. When I was in the Great Spirit Lodge (Westminster Abbey) where the kings are buried, I laid my face upon my hands. The words of the preacher I did not know, but they sounded like the softy winds through a leafy forest and my eyelids were heavy. Then I heard soft music and sweet voices, and a great cloud came down towards me, and when it nearly touched me, it opened and I saw in a blaze of light the girls with wings and they beckoned me. And I was so certain that what I saw was that, I called out to my young men who were with me ‘Come and see what this is,’ and the young men replied, “You have been dreaming.’ But what I saw was true, for when I looked around the great lodge afterwards, I saw on the walls the same girls with wings as I saw in my dreams. Our people will wonder at these things, when we return to the Native Reservation and tell them what we have seen.”

=== English hospitality ===
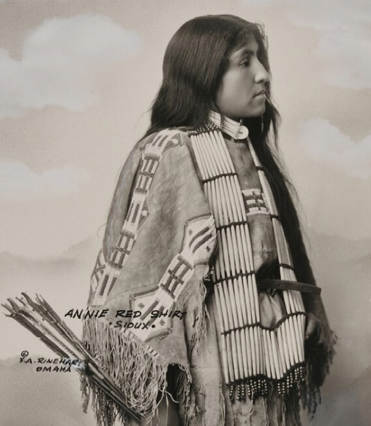
Annie Red Shirt, daughter of Chief Red Shirt, Trans-Mississippi and International Exposition, Omaha, Nebraska, 1898.

The London Courier reported Red Shirt and companions had an evening of English hospitality. “Willesden was taken on Sunday last, being invaded by the Indian contingent of Buffalo Bill's Wild West Show. The fact was that Mr. T.B. Jones, of the White Hart Hotel had invited Red Shirt, Blue Horse, Little Bull, Little Chief and Flies Above and about twenty others to an outing to his hostelry, where they might enjoy his hospitality. In carriage and brake, provided by my host, these celebrated chiefs, along with their companions, painted faces, feathers and ornaments, and clad in their garments, accompanied by their chief interpreter, Broncho Bill and other officials, reached the White Heart about half-past 12 o’clock.”

=== Surrounded By the Enemy's funeral ===
In 1887, Buffalo Bill and his Wild West camped in the City of Salford, England, for five months. While in Salford, a Wild West gun-slinging and horse-riding stuntman known as Surrounded By the Enemy died from a chest infection, probably caused by the chilly weather, in his teepee at the Salford Quays. "Surrounded" was described as six feet seven inches tall, aged 22 and an imposing sight of a Sioux warrior. There was no recorded church burial, and it is believed that Surrounded was buried in a traditional Sioux ceremony conducted by Red Shirt and Black Elk. The Oglala Lakota connection lives on in Salford with street names such as Buffalo Court and Dakota Avenue.

=== Eiffel Tower ===
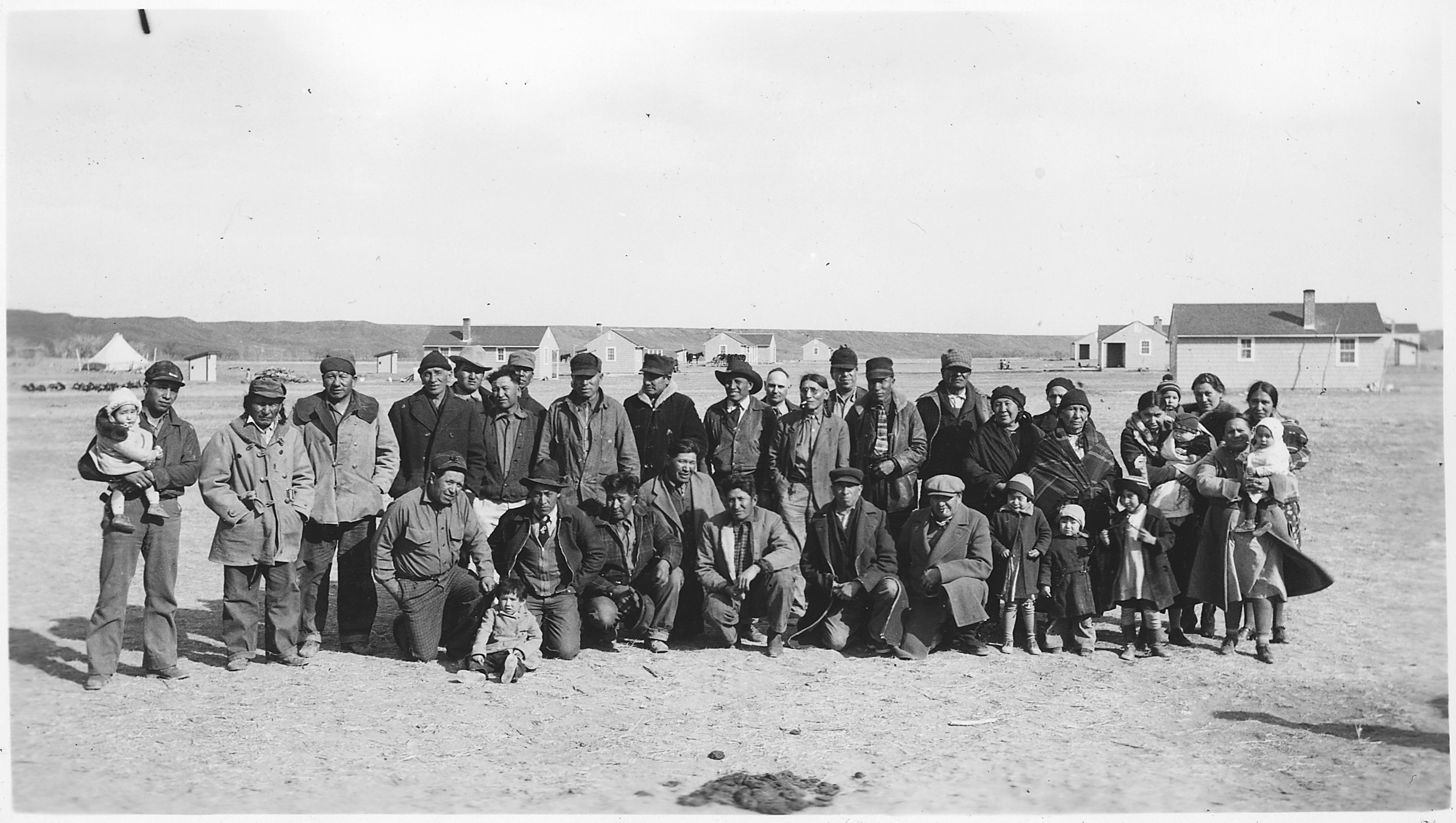
Descendants of Chief Red Shirt and Chief Two Bulls, c. 1930

In 1889, Cody's Wild West spent six months in Paris. On the centennial of the fall of the Bastille, a group of Wild Westers ascended the Eiffel Tower. From the observation plat, Red Shirt surveying Paris below him and the sky above, remarked "If people look so little to us up here, how much smaller they must seem to One "Wakantanka" who is up higher."

== Final days ==
Wild Westing was Chief Red Shirt's main economic support for the next several decades.

Chief Red Shirt died in 1925 at the age of 77 and is buried at Pine Ridge, South Dakota.

== Red Shirt Table ==
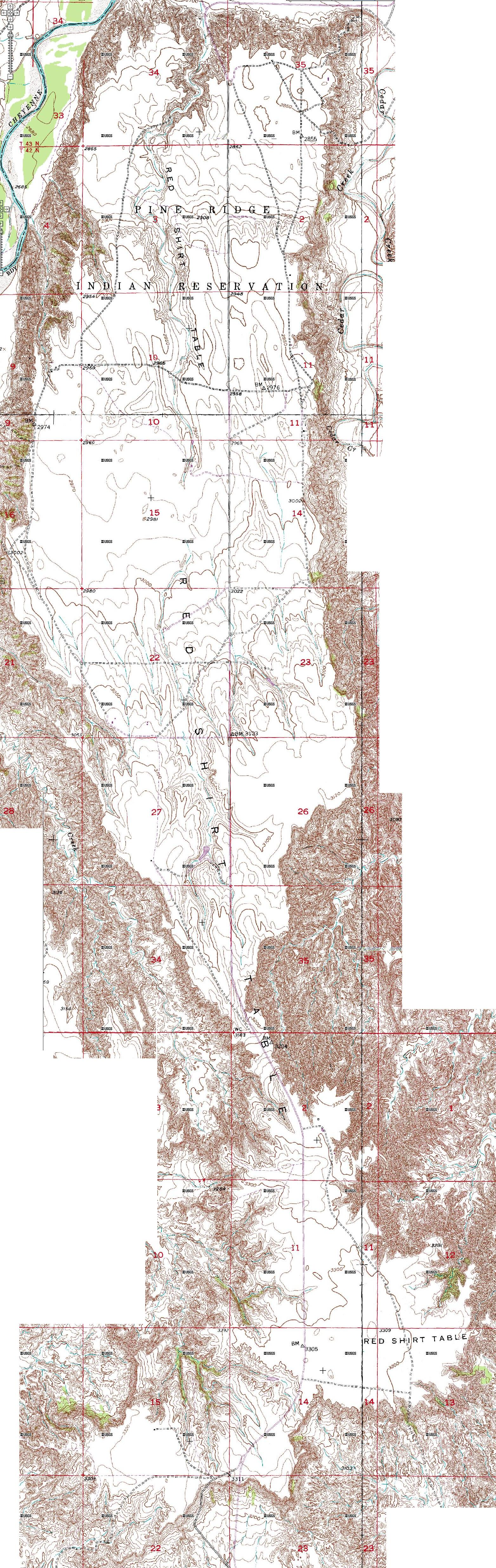
Red Shirt Table, Oglala Lakota County, South Dakota

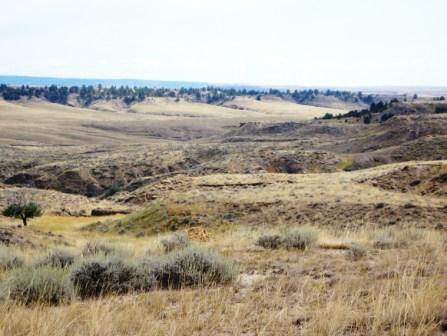
Buffalo Gap National Grassland

Red Shirt Table is a table mountain in Oglala Lakota County, South Dakota, and part of the Pine Ridge Indian Reservation of the Oglala Sioux Tribe. The table, named after Chief Red Shirt is approximately 10 miles (16 km) long, generally extending in a north–south direction, and is located along the western boundary of Badlands National Park's Stronghold Unit. The park's highest point is located at the southern end of the table at 3,340 feet (1,020 m). The irregularly shaped southern portion of the table is connected to the more rectangular northern portion by a narrow section less than 800 feet (240 m) wide; the northern portion is up to two miles (3 km) wide and is composed of two elongated lobes with a runoff channel between them. The top surface of the table slopes gently downhill as it extends northward, with the north edge being at about 2,800' in elevation. It drops off steeply from almost all sides, up to 300'. French Creek flows to the northeast, and the intermittent Cedar Creek drains the entire east side of the table.

Red Shirt Table is one of many tables in the White River Badlands. Others include Cuny Table, Sheep Mountain Table, and Heck Table.

The Oglala Lakota community of Red Shirt is located below the north end of the table in the Cheyenne River valley in the Pine Ridge Indian Reservation.

== Red Shirt Wilderness Area ==
Buffalo Gap National Grassland located primarily in southwestern South Dakota, United States, is the second largest National Grassland in the country and covers almost 600,000 acres. The area is mixed prairie and chalky badlands and managed by the U.S. Forest Service. Within this grassland, the Cheyenne River watershed contains some of the finest examples of potential prairie wilderness left in the nation, including the largest remaining roadless area in the Great Plains. Three areas—Red Shirt, Indian Creek, and Chalk Hills—have been proposed for wilderness designation by the South Dakota Wild Grassland Coalition, which is working to protect these areas as a legacy to South Dakotans. Red Shirt comprises approximately 16,000 acres and is characterized by colorful striped buttes, mounds and cones rising to grassy plateaus and ridge lines, with Schumacher Canyon and its exposed layers of color-banded clays on steep slopes as its centerpiece. It is northwest of the Pine Ridge Native Reservation and was used by the Lakota for shelter, food, medicinal plants, and burial sites until the Native Wars ended. Red Shirt borders Black Hills National Forest, where the contrast in landscapes is marked. Black Elk Wilderness, which lies within the forest, contains Black Elk Peak, the highest U.S. pinnacle east of the Rocky Mountains. Hikers can see views of this from Red Shirt.

== Red Shirt, South Dakota ==
Red Shirt, South Dakota, is named after Chief Red Shirt.
