= Arnold Short Bull =

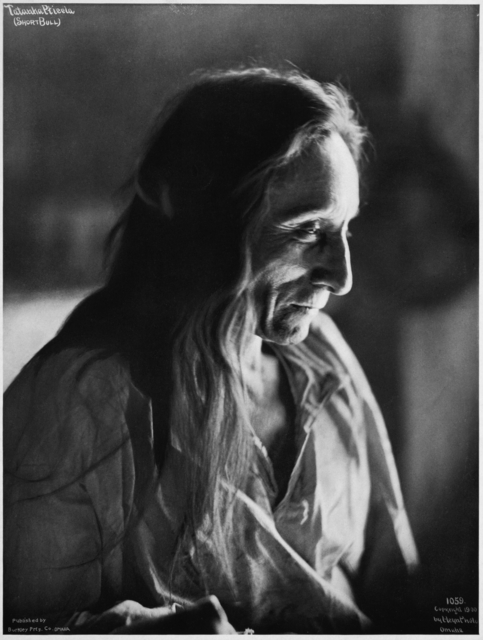
Short Bull c. 1900

Arnold Short Bull (Lakota: Tȟatȟáŋka Ptéčela; c. 1845 – 1915) was a member of the Sičháŋǧu (Brulé) Lakota tribe of Native Americans, instrumental in bringing the Ghost Dance movement to the Rosebud Reservation.

== Early life ==
Short Bull was born near the Niobrara River in present-day Nebraska in the mid-1840s. In 1876, he fought at the Battle of Little Bighorn. At the time, he lived on the Pine Ridge Reservation, adjacent to the Rosebud Reservation.

== Ghost Dance, 1890-91 ==
In 1889, Short Bull, his brother-in-law Kicking Bear, and eight other Lakota traveled to Nevada to visit the Paiute medicine man, Wovoka. They returned to the Pine Ridge Reservation in 1890 with news of the Ghost Dance, a dance that would restore Lakota culture to the land. The two became ranking apostles of the movement to the Brulé at Rosebud Reservation.

Short Bull preached a militant and apocalyptic vision of the Ghost Dance, in which the spirits of Native American ancestors would return to restore the old way of life, while the whites would be erased from the land, believing that performing the ghost dance would hasten the arrival of this promise land. He also advocated against the new farms promoted on the reservation, and encouraged his followers to sell all farming supplies for weapons and ammunition. Incidents of Native Americans slaughtering livestock also scared the authorities as well as settlers in the area.

While delivering a sermon to a large crowd of Brulé, Short Bull said that they must perform the dance at Pass Creek in November during the full moon, in order to bring about the promised land earlier than expected. Stressing the importance of this dance, Short Bull instructed them not to stop, and that supernatural forces would protect them even if soldiers tried to stop the ritual, saying: "There may be soldiers surround you, but pay no attention to them, continue the dance. If the soldiers surround you four deep, three of you on whom I have put holy shirts will sing a song, which I have taught you, around them, when some of them will drop dead, then the rest will start to run, but their horses will sink into the earth; the riders will jump from their horses, but they will sink into the earth also; then you can do as you desire with them. Now you must know this, that all the soldiers and that race will be dead; there will be only five thousand [Indians] left living on earth. My friends and relations, this is straight and true."

On November 20, 1890, U.S. troops marched into the Pine Ridge and Rosebud reservations, intending to suppress the Ghost Dance movement. Short Bull, along with other active Ghost Dancers, fled to a camp on White Clay Creek. On November 30, three days after General James W. Forsyth's 7th Cavalry reached Pine Ridge, Short Bull led around 3,000 Ghost Dancers to a natural fortress at Cuny Table in the Badlands. He returned to Pine Ridge on December 27 after a council with five hundred Sioux.

Short Bull and the remaining Ghost Dancers surrendered to General Nelson A. Miles on January 15, 1891, at Pine Ridge. Short Bull and Kicking Bear were imprisoned at Fort Sheridan, Illinois.

== Later life ==
Upon his release in 1891, Short Bull joined Buffalo Bill Cody's Wild West Show, and made several trips to Europe with the show.

His drawings and paintings depict the Ghost Dance and Sun Dance. His painting "Short Bull Falls from Wounded Horse" is in the collections of the Metropolitan Museum of Art.

Short Bull died in 1915 on the Rosebud Reservation.

== Portraits of Short Bull ==
- Denver Public Library or by George Spencer, Minnesota Historical Society.
- By George Heyn, Minnesota Historical Society.
