= Red Shirt, South Dakota =

Red Shirt, South Dakota Ógle Šá / Ógle Lúta
- Unincorporated community
- Location within the state of South Dakota Red Shirt (the United States)
- Coordinates: 43°40′03″N 102°53′56″W
- Country: United States
- State: South Dakota
- County: Oglala Lakota
- Elevation: 2,694 ft (821 m)
- Time zone: UTC-7 (Mountain (MST))
  - Summer (DST): UTC-6 (MDT)
- GNIS feature ID: 1262279

Red Shirt (Lakota: Ógle Šá or Ógle Lúta) is a small unincorporated Oglala Lakota village southeast of Hermosa in Oglala Lakota County, South Dakota, United States. It is on the Pine Ridge Reservation, just outside Badlands National Park.

Red Shirt is located just past the east end of SD 40, which becomes BIA Highway 41 at the bridge over the Cheyenne River (boundary between Custer County and Oglala Lakota County and of the Pine Ridge Indian Reservation. The built-up area of the community, including Red Shirt School, is located on the flats of the valley of the Cheyenne River, below the north end of Red Shirt Table, a prominent feature of the landscape of northwestern Oglala Lakota County.

Red Shirt, as are many Oglala and Lakota communities, was named for chief Red Shirt, (Ógle Lúta, ca 1845–1925) whose band settled in the area in the late 1870s.

In 2009, the village consisted of approximately 23 houses (including some mobile homes) in two clusters (Upper and Lower Red Shirt), the Red Shirt School (both the modern (constructed 2005–2008) with two large domes, and the older school buildings), a dance ring, sports fields, several community buildings, and a sewage plant. The community is the closest on Pine Ridge Reservation to Rapid City. Red Shirt is the last community served by the massive Mni Wiconi water project pipeline which pumps water from the Missouri River near Fort Pierre, South Dakota up to the Rosebud and Pine Ridge Reservations. The village is located near the Cheyenne River but outside the Special Flood Hazard Area (100-year floodplain) of the river.

Red Shirt School is part of the Oglala Lakota County School District, and is an elementary school, but also is a campus/coordinating/test center for the Shannon County Virtual High School (SCVHS), which provides instruction via internet and is the only public high school located on the Pine Ridge Reservation.
