= Red Shirt Table =

Tableland in South Dakota

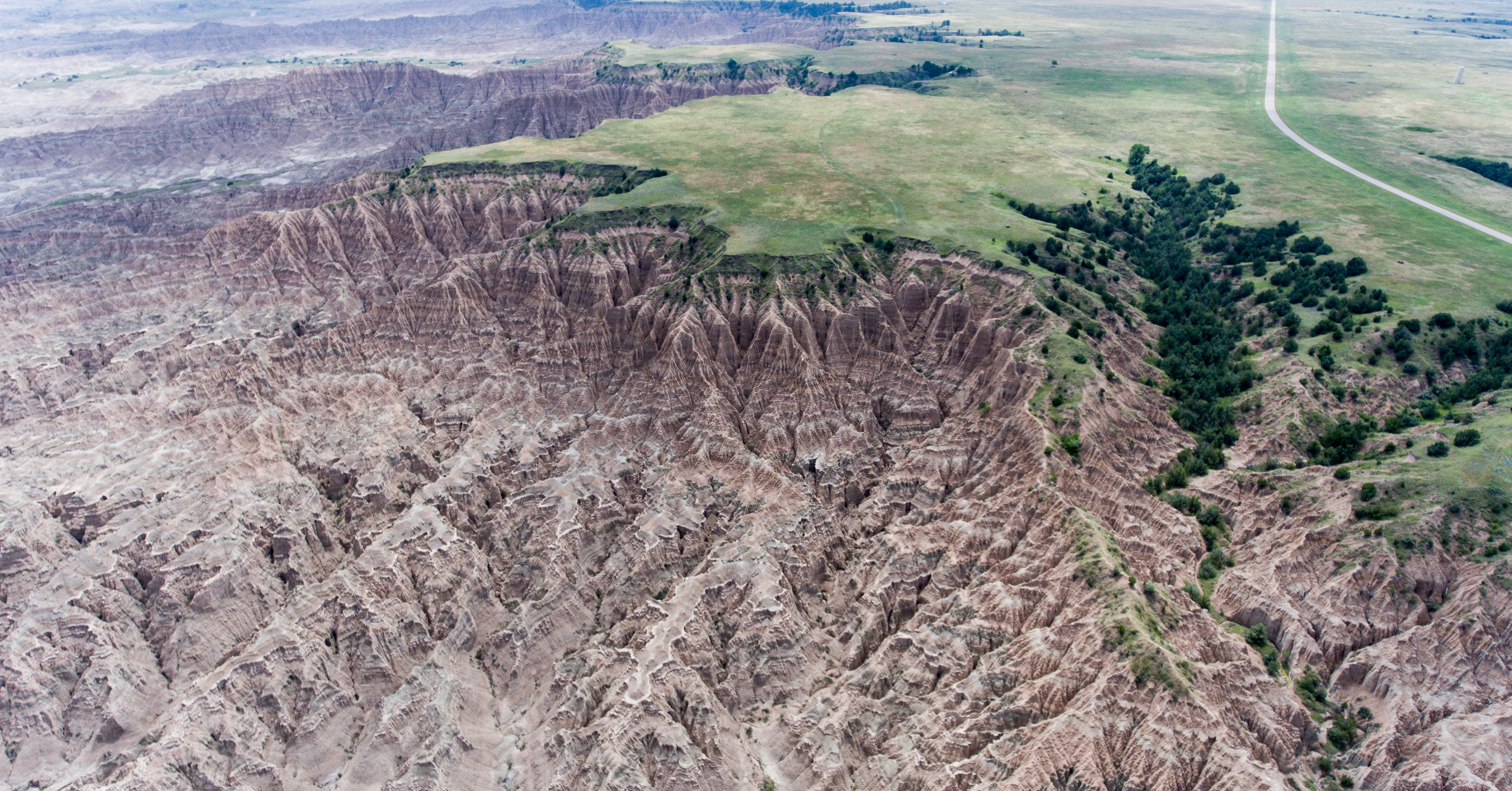
- Aerial view of Red Shirt Table

Highest point
- Elevation: 3,340 ft (1,020 m)
- Coordinates: 43°35′N 102°54′W

Geography
- Location within South Dakota Location within the United States
- Location: Oglala Lakota County, South Dakota
- Topo map: USGS

Climbing
- Easiest route: Red Shirt Table Road

Red Shirt Table is a tableland in Oglala Lakota County, South Dakota, within the Pine Ridge Indian Reservation of the Oglala Sioux Tribe. The table, named after Chief Red Shirt is approximately 10 miles (16 km) long, generally extending in a north–south direction, and is located along the western boundary of Badlands National Park's Stronghold Unit. The park's highest point is located at the southern end of the table at 3,340 feet (1,020 m). The irregularly shaped southern portion of the table is connected to the more rectangular northern portion by a narrow section less than 800 feet (240 m) wide; the northern portion is up to two miles (3 km) wide and is composed of two elongated lobes with a runoff channel between them. The top surface of the table slopes gently downhill as it extends northward, with the north edge being at about 2,800' in elevation. It drops off steeply from almost all sides, up to 300'. French Creek flows to the northeast, and the intermittent Cedar Creek drains the entire east side of the table.

Red Shirt Table is one of many tables in the White River Badlands; others include Cuny Table, Sheep Mountain Table, and Heck Table.

The Oglala Lakota community of Red Shirt, located below the north end of the table (in the Cheyenne River valley), is the village of Pine Ridge Indian Reservation closest to Rapid City, South Dakota and has grown in recent years.
