= Cuny Table =

Table mountain in Oglala Lakota County, South Dakota, US

- Location within South Dakota Location within the United States

Highest point
- Elevation: 3,352 ft (1,022 m)
- Coordinates: 43°31′N 102°46′W

Geography
- Location: Oglala Lakota County, South Dakota
- Topo map: USGS

Climbing
- Easiest route: Cuny Table Road

Cuny Table is a table mountain in Oglala Lakota County, South Dakota, within the Pine Ridge Indian Reservation of the Oglala Sioux Tribe. The table is approximately 15 miles (24 km) long and approx. 3 miles (4.8 km) to 4 miles (6.4 km) wide, generally extending in a west–east direction, and is located along the southern boundary of Badlands National Park's Stronghold Unit, but not a part of it. The Table mountain rises about 300 feet from the floor of the South Dakota badlands. Cedar Creek flows to the northwest, Cedar Creek to the north and Cottonwood Creek drains the entire northeast side of the table. Water falling onto the southern flank of Cuny Table flows to the White River. Wolf Canyon lies to the east.

The table was named after Charles Cuny Senior, who moved to the area with his family in 1880. In 1942, a portion of the Cuny Table was bought by the military to establish a bombing range. The range was used by the Air Force until 1958 and afterwards by the National Guard for maneuvers until 1974.

Cuny Table is one of many tables in the White River Badlands; others include Red Shirt Table, Sheep Mountain Table, Blindman Table and Heck Table.
