= Kicking Bear =

Lakota military leader (1845–1904)

- Matȟó Wanáȟtake
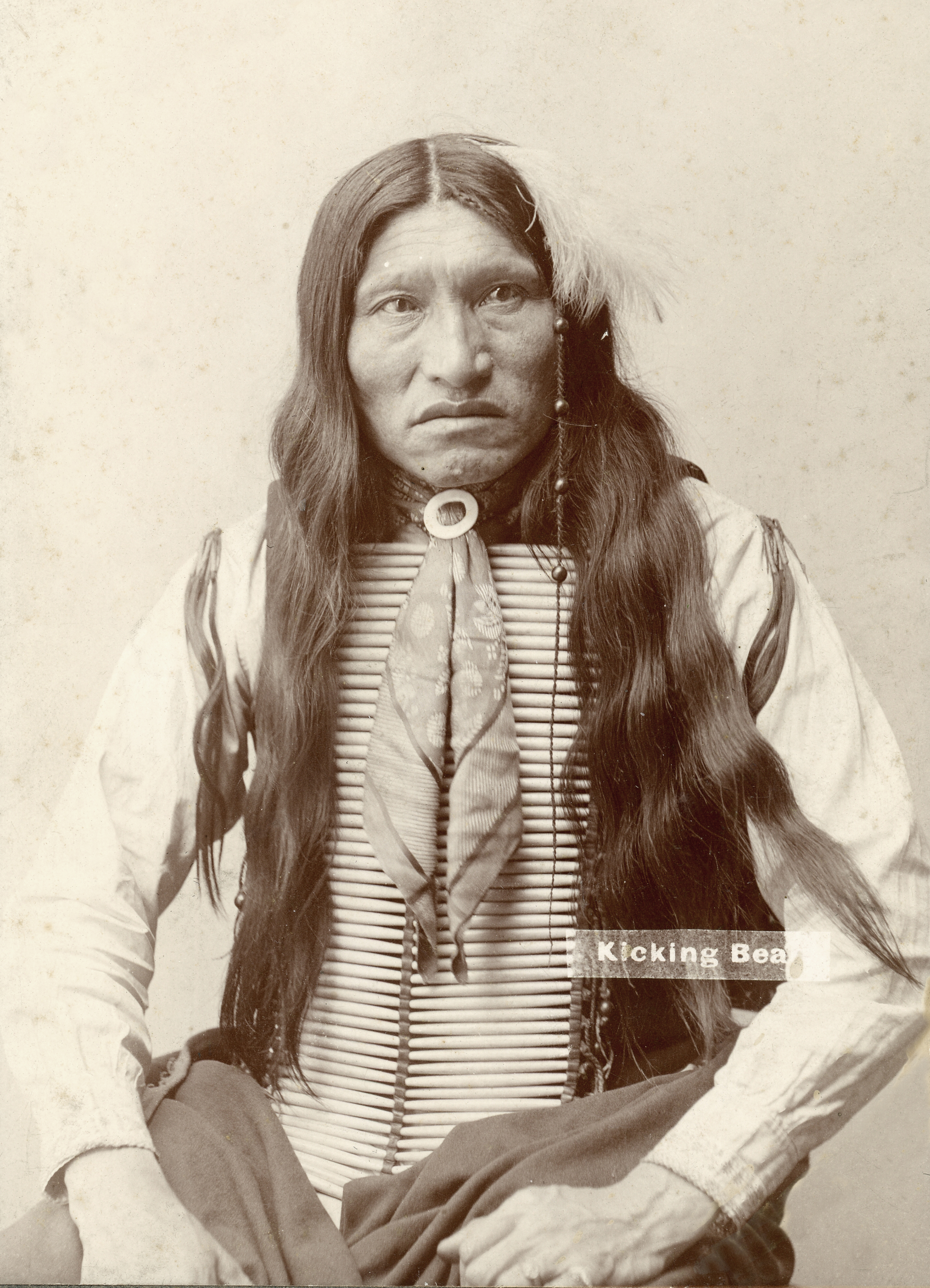
- Kicking Bear, 1891, while a prisoner of war at Fort Sheridan, Illinois

Oglala Lakota who became a band chief of the Minneconjou Lakota leader

Personal details
- Born: March 18, 1845 Pine Ridge Indian Reservation, South Dakota, U.S.
- Died: May 28, 1904 (aged 59) Manderson-White Horse Creek, South Dakota, U.S.
- Spouse: Woodpecker Woman
- Relations: Flying Hawk (brother); Crazy Horse (first cousin)

Kicking Bear (Lakota: Matȟó Wanáȟtaka [maˈtˣɔ waˈnaxtaka]; March 18, 1845 – May 28, 1904) was an Oglala Lakota who became a band chief of the Miniconjou Lakota Sioux. He fought in several battles with his brother, Flying Hawk, and first cousin, Crazy Horse, during the War for the Black Hills, including the Battle of the Greasy Grass.

Kicking Bear was one of the five warrior cousins who sacrificed blood and flesh for Crazy Horse at the Last Sun Dance of 1877. The ceremony was held to honor Crazy Horse one year after the victory at the Battle of the Little Bighorn (known as the Battle of the Greasy Grass to the Sioux), and to offer prayers for him in the trying times ahead. Crazy Horse attended the Sun Dance as the honored guest but did not take part in the dancing. The five warrior cousins were brothers Kicking Bear, Flying Hawk and Black Fox II, all sons of Chief Black Fox, also known as Great Kicking Bear, and two other cousins, Eagle Thunder and Walking Eagle. The five warrior cousins were braves considered vigorous battle men of distinction.

Kicking Bear was also a holy man active in the Ghost Dance religious movement of 1890, and had traveled with fellow Lakota Short Bull to visit the movement's leader, Wovoka (a Paiute holy man living in Nevada). The three Lakota men were instrumental in bringing the movement to their people who were living on reservations in South Dakota. Following the murder of Sitting Bull, Kicking Bear and Short Bull were imprisoned at Fort Sheridan, Illinois. He reportedly came to regret becoming involved with the movement, after seeing the problems with the government it caused the tribes that participated and later said "Who would have thought that dancing could make such trouble?"

Upon their release in 1891, both men joined Buffalo Bill Cody's Wild West Show and toured with the show in Europe. After a year-long tour, Kicking Bear returned to the Pine Ridge Reservation to care for his family.

In March 1896, Kicking Bear traveled to Washington, D.C. as one of three Sioux delegates taking grievances to the Bureau of Indian Affairs. He made his feelings known about the drunken behavior of traders on the reservation, and asked that Native Americans have more ability to make their own decisions. While in Washington, Kicking Bear agreed to have a life mask made of himself. The mask was to be used as the face of a Sioux warrior to be displayed in the Smithsonian Institution's National Museum of Natural History. A gifted artist, he painted his account of the Battle of Greasy Grass at the request of artist Frederic Remington in 1898, more than twenty years after the battle.

Kicking Bear was buried with the arrowhead as a symbol of the ways he so dearly desired to resurrect when he died on May 28, 1904. His remains are buried somewhere in the vicinity of Manderson-White Horse Creek.

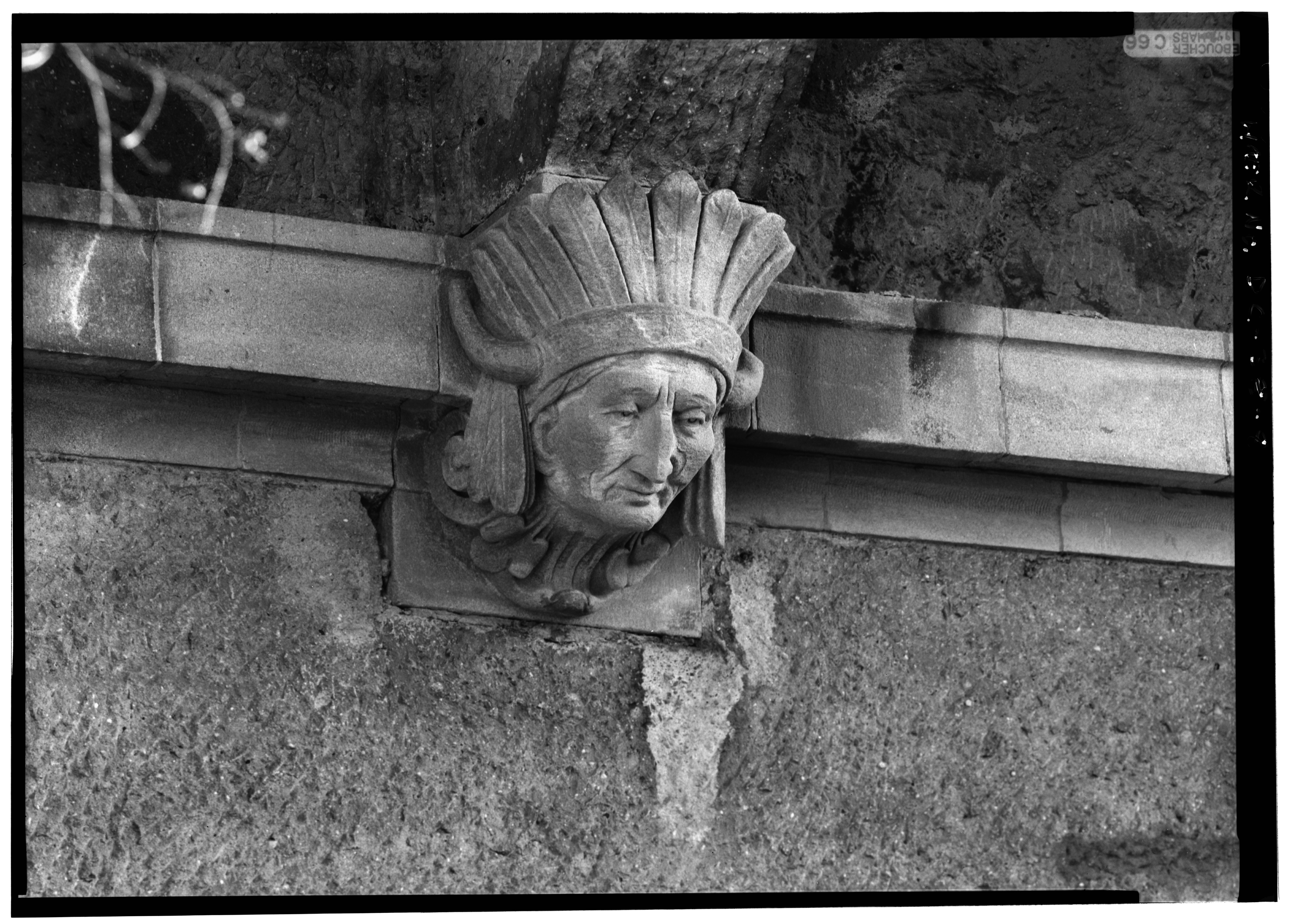
Sculpture from life mask of Kicking Bear by Alexander Phimister Proctor, on Q Street Bridge, Washington, D.C.

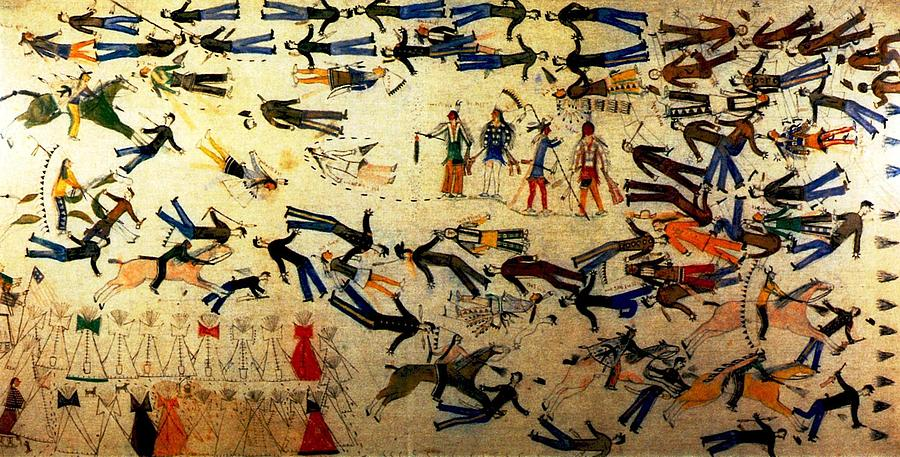
Kicking Bear's painting of the Battle of Little Bighorn

== See also ==
- List of Native American artists
