= Wágluȟe =

One of seven bands of the Oglala Lakota

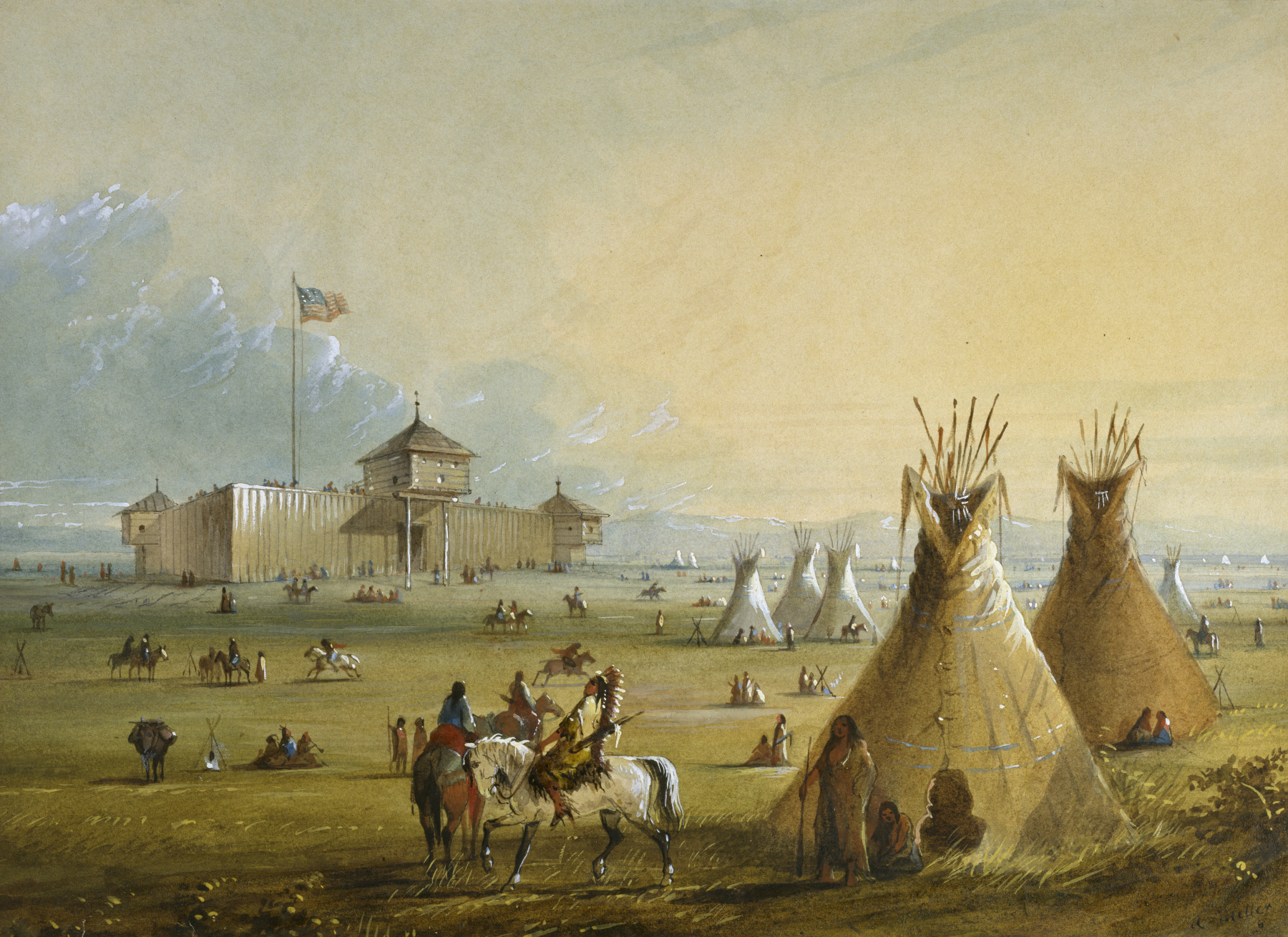
In 1849, Old Chief Smoke moved his Wágluȟe camp to Ft. Laramie, Wyoming.

The Wágluȟe Band is one of the seven bands of the Oglala Lakota. The Wágluȟe Band is also known as the Loafer Band.

The seven Bands of the Oglala Lakota are the Wágluȟe (Loafers), Ite Sica (Bad Face), Oyukpe (Broken Off), Wazaza (Shred Into Strips), Tapisleca (Split Liver), Payabaya (Shove Aside) and Kiyaksa (Little Wound).

== Old Chief Smoke ==
Old Chief Smoke was an Oglala Lakota head chief and one of the last great Shirt Wearers, a highly prestigious Lakota warrior society. The Smoke people were one of the most prominent Lakota families of the 18th and 19th centuries. Old Chief Smoke was one of the first Lakota chiefs to appreciate the power of the whites and the need for association. In 1849, Old Chief Smoke moved his Wágluȟe camp to Ft. Laramie, Wyoming when the U.S. Army first garrisoned the old trading post to protect and supply wagon trains of white migrants along the Oregon Trail. Lakota families from other camps who preferred the safety of Ft. Laramie joined Smoke's camp. Old Chief Smoke was aware of the power of the whites, their overwhelming numbers and the futility of war. Old Chief Smoke observed and learned the customs of the whites. By the late 1850s, some Lakota from the wild buffalo-hunting camps began to disparage Old Chief Smoke's camp at Ft. Laramie and call Old Chief Smoke's community Wágluȟe (Loafers), meaning they were like men who lived with their wives' relatives, that is, hangers-on, loafers. On the other hand, some Wagluhe thought of the wild Lakota as county bumpkins. During the increasing strife of the 1860s, the Ft. Laramie took on a military posture and was the primary staging ground for the U.S. Army during Red Cloud's War. In 1864, Old Chief Smoke died and was placed on a scaffold near sight of his beloved Ft. Laramie and replaced by Chief Big Mouth.

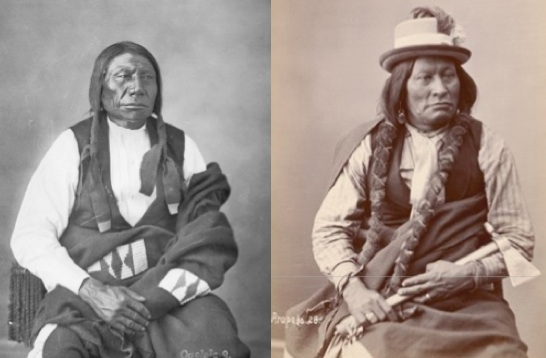
Chief Blue Horse, left, and Chief Big Mouth, Wágluȟe Band, Oglala Lakota. Twin sons of Old Chief Smoke.

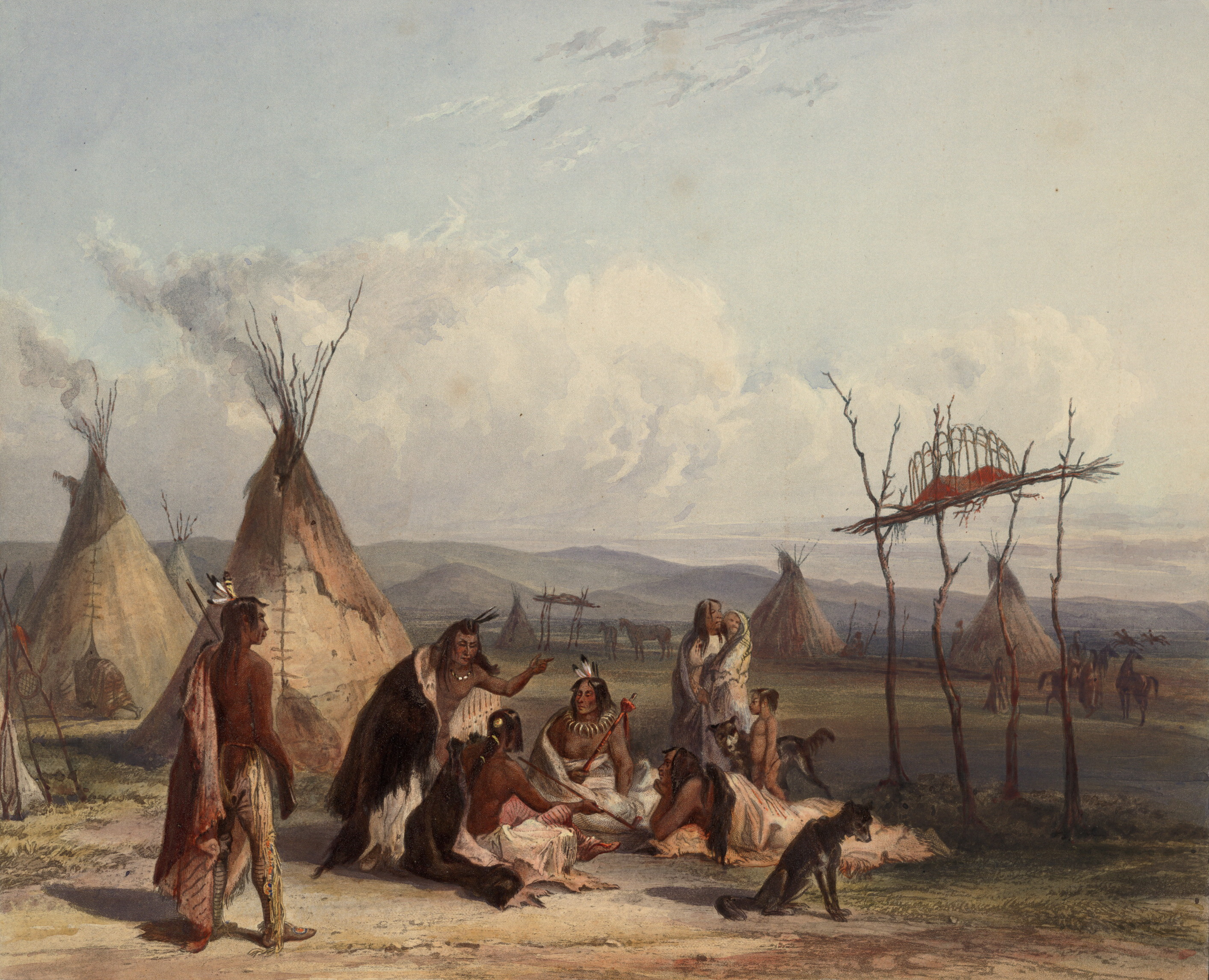
In 1864, Old Chief Smoke died and was placed on a scaffold near sight of his beloved Ft. Laramie.

== Wágluȟe at Ft. Laramie ==
The Wágluȟe were aware of the power of the whites, their overwhelming numbers and the futility of war. Traditionally, in intertribal warfare, a fight among fifty warriors in which two men were killed was considered a big fight. The Wágluȟe at Ft. Laramie, Wyoming, heard of the 50,000 casualties of the three-day Battle at Gettysburg in July 1863, and knew what white men meant when they spoke of battle. The Wágluȟe observed and learned the customs of the whites. Wágluȟe were considered by the U.S. Army and Indian agents to be the most progressive band of Lakota and many became Indian Police, U.S. Army Indian Scouts with the U.S. 4th Cavalry Regiment from Ft. Laramie, Wyoming and intermediaries with other bands of Lakotas. The Wágluȟe formed a civil administration at Ft. Laramie, and Old Chief Smoke appointed Chief Blue Horse and Chief Big Mouth the first Indian Police officers. The Wágluȟe were the first Oglala Lakota to send their children to the Carlisle Indian Industrial School in Carlisle, Pennsylvania, for a formal education. Wágluȟe U.S. Army Indian Scouts were a "Band of Brothers" with U.S. Army Cavalry Scouts and later were the first Oglala Lakota to travel with Col. William Frederick "Buffalo Bill" Cody and his Wild West throughout the U.S. and Europe. Wágluȟe from the Great Plains Wars chose to offer their services to Colonel "Buffalo Bill" Cody and appreciated that Wild West shows preserved Oglala Lakota heritage during a time when the Bureau of Indian Affairs was intent on promoting Native assimilation.

== The Murder of Chief Big Mouth ==
Chief Big Mouth was the elder son and became head chief in 1864 upon the death of Old Chief Smoke. Big Mouth opposed Chief Spotted Tail's leadership and criticized his negotiations with Washington politicians. On October 29, 1869, Spotted Tail called at the door of Big Mouth's lodge, and asked to speak with him. On his appearance, he was seized by two warriors, who held him fast, while Spotted Tail drew a pistol, placed it against his body, and shot Chief Big Mouth dead.

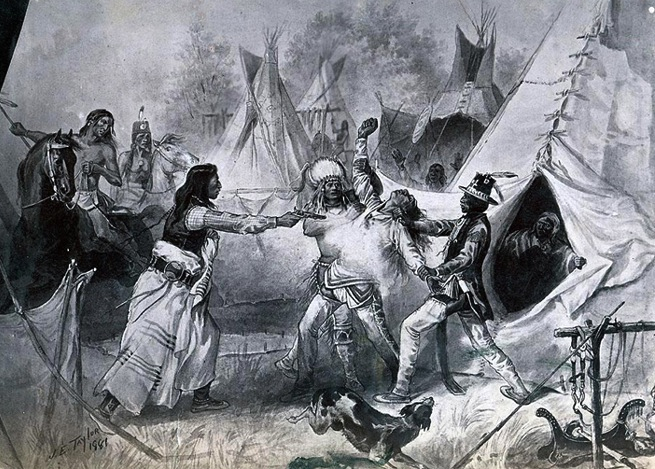
The Murder of Chief Big Mouth by Chief Spotted Tail, 1869

Captain DeWitt C. Poole at the Whetstone Indian Agency reported Chief Blue Horse's shock and anger to Chief Big Mouth's murder. "Blue Horse started a violent harangue in the Sioux language. He had a rifle in one hand and a strung bow and a bunch of arrows in the other, and when he dropped his blanket, two navy Colts and a big scalping knife could be seen in their sheaths at his belt. He was in a raving fury, leaping and bounding about the room as he hurled accusations and threats at Chief Spotted Tail. Chief Big Mouth died toward dawn. Some hours later, Blue Horse came to agent Poole's office and told he that he felt so sad over the death of his great and good brother that he would have to wash off the paint he had put on his face for the feast the day before and begin mourning. The interpreter warned Poole that if this Indian washed his face and started mourning, it would mean the reopening of the feud and more shootings. The agent would give Blue Horse two blankets, that would comfort him, and he would refrain from washing his face and going gunning for Spotted Tail. The blankets were handed over, and the grieving brother went quietly away." Poole later reported that Chief Spotted Tail made a prompt payment of a stipulated number of ponies to Blue Horse and that aboriginal law had been vindicated.

Chief Blue Horse was pressed to avenge the murder of Chief Big Mouth, but chose the path of non-violence and instead moved with his Wágluȟe Band to another locality. Chief Red Cloud was also aggrieved by his brother's murder. Nonetheless, Chief Red Cloud continued to work with Chief Spotted Tail in delegations to Washington, D.C. to protect tribal lands, enforce broken treaties and preserve Lakota heritage.

== Wágluȟe Politics ==
Some Wágluȟe went north to the Powder River country fight in Red Cloud's War and became closely tied to militant Minneconjou, Sans Arc and Hunkpappa. Other Wágluȟe supplied food and munitions to Chief Red Cloud. All Wágluȟe respected Chief Red Cloud. The U.S. Army concluded that, even if there were doubts about their reliability, the Wágluȟe's role as scouts, civil administrators and mediators was absolutely essential.

== New Wágluȟe Leaders ==
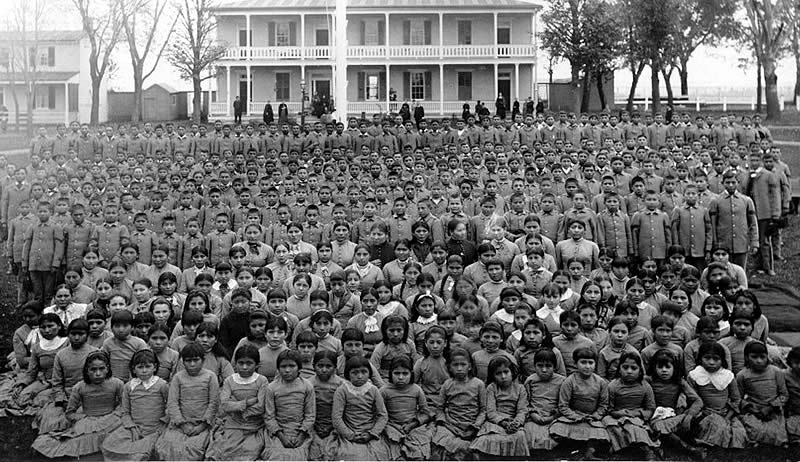
Children of Wágluȟe leaders attended the first class at the Carlisle Indian Industrial School in Carlisle, PA in 1879.

After the Battle of Little Big Horn and the arrest of Chief Blue Horse in 1876, the Wágluȟe split into three bands. Blue Horse remained head chief of one band, and rising young leaders American Horse and Three Bears led the other two. Red Shirt was also a popular leader and served as Three Bears' lieutenant. These leaders had much in common. Blue Horse, American Horse, and Three Bears all served as a U.S. Army Indian Scouts with the U.S. 4th Cavalry Regiment from Ft. Laramie, Wyoming, led Lakota delegations to Washington, D.C., their children attended the first class at the Carlisle Indian Industrial School in Carlisle, Pennsylvania and all joined with Buffalo Bill's Wild West. Red Shirt joined with the Wild West show, but his children never attended Carlisle Indian School.

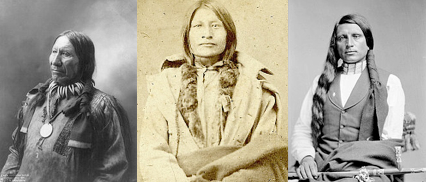
Wágluȟe leaders after the Battle of the Little Big Horn in 1876. Left to right: American Horse, Three Bears and Red Shirt.

== Red Cloud as a Wágluȟe ==
Red Cloud was recognized as a leader of the Wágluȟe and the Ite Sica. In 1860, Lieutenant Henry E. Maynadier, who later became the commandant at Fort Laramie, recognized Red Cloud as one of Old Chief Smoke's sons, a Wagluhe. Yet, in reality, whenever the Oglalas were seriously threatened, Red Cloud would become the de facto chief of the Ite Sica (Bad Faces).

== Chief Blue Horse ==
In 1890, Native American historian Charles Alexander Eastman recorded his first meeting with Chief Blue Horse at Pine Ridge Agency, South Dakota. Eastman reported Chief Blue Horse was his "first caller" at the Pine Ridge Agency and Chief Emeritus of the Wágluȟe Band. "He softly opened the door and stepped in without knocking, in characteristic Indian fashion. After greeting me in Sioux, he promptly produced his credentials, which consisted of well-worn papers that had been given him by various high military officers, from General William Selby Harney to General George Crook, and were dated 1854 to 1877. The old man wanted nothing so much as an audience, and the tales of his exploits served to pass the evening." Eastman recorded that "Blue Horse had been, as he claimed, a friend to the white man, for he was one of the first Sioux U.S. Army Indian Scouts, and also one of the first to cross the ocean with Buffalo Bill."

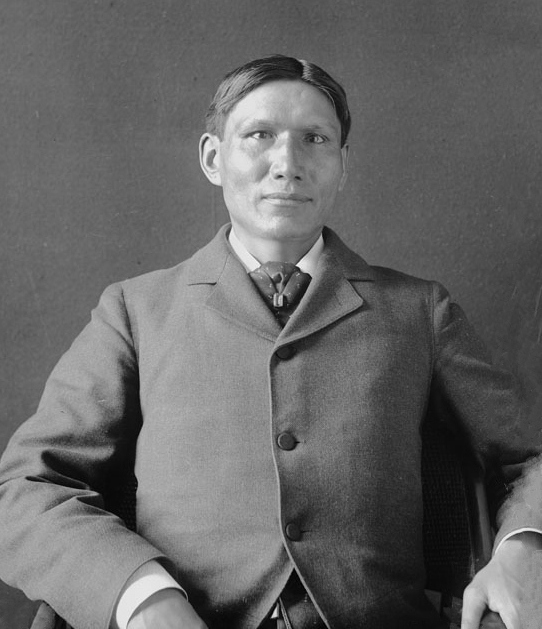
Charles Alexander Eastman (February 19, 1858 – January 8, 1939) was a Native American physician, writer, national lecturer and reformer. "Blue Horse had been as he claimed, a friend to the white man."

== Wild Westing ==
Wágluȟe U.S. Army Indian Scouts from the Pine Ridge Agency, South Dakota, were the first Oglala Lakota to travel with Col. William Frederick "Buffalo Bill" Cody and his Wild West throughout the U.S. and Europe. Veterans from the Great Plains Wars chose to offer their services to Colonel "Buffalo Bill" Cody and appreciated that Wild Westing preserved Oglala Lakota heritage during a time when the Bureau of Indian Affairs was intent on promoting Native assimilation.
