= Old Chief Smoke =

Oglala Sioux head chief (1774–1864)

Smoke
- The Great Sioux Chief
- Reign: 1797 – 1864
- Successor: Chief Man Afraid of His Horses (father of They Even Fear His Horses)
- Born: October 1774
- Died: September 1864 (aged 89) near modern-day Fort Laramie, Wyoming
- Father: Body Parts
- Mother: Looking Walker Woman

Old Chief Smoke (Lakota: Šóta; October 1774 – September 1864) was an original Oglala Sioux head chief.

== Accomplishments ==
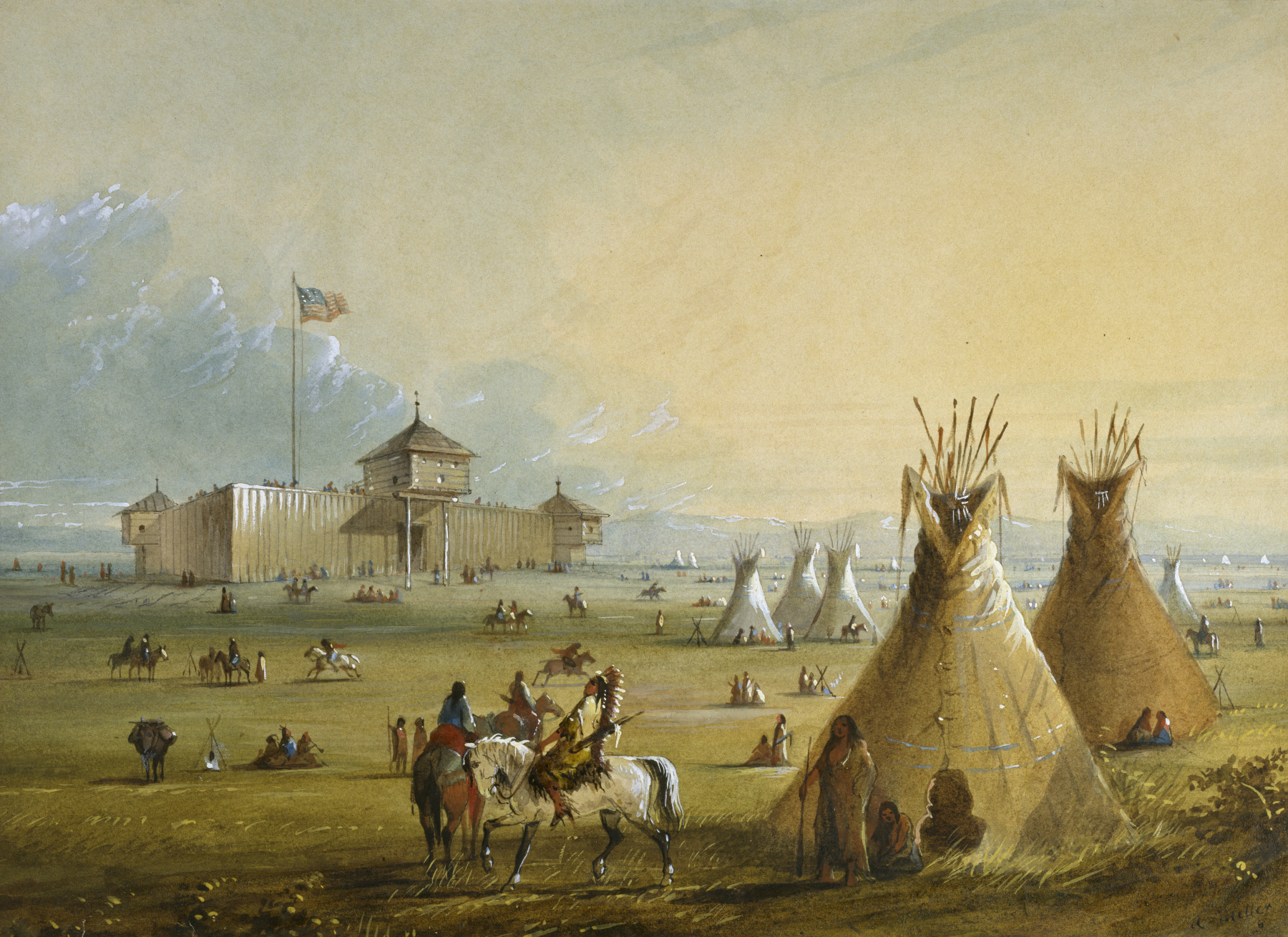
In 1849, Old Chief Smoke moved his Wágluȟe camp to Ft. Laramie, Wyoming. Wágluȟe were considered by the U.S. Army and Indian agents to be the most progressive band of Lakota and many became Indian Police, U.S. Army Indian Scouts with the U.S. 4th Cavalry Regiment from Ft. Laramie, Wyoming, and intermediaries with other bands of Lakotas.

In his youth, Old Chief Smoke was recognized as a great horse capturer and a great warrior. He rose to prominence as a headman and was eventually chosen by the Lakotas to be a primary chief. After the death of the Húŋkpa’ti′la's headman, Stone Knife, in 1797, Old Man Smoke led the Teton Húŋkpa’ti′la (The Camp at the End of the Circle), later known as the Oglala Lakota Sioux Nation from approximately 1797 to 1864.

He is most noted for co-founding the Oglala's name (Those Who Scatter Their Owns) in 1834. The tribe solidified under central governance of Smoke when he became chief in 1797 but the tribe became loosely organized and split into two factions. When Smoke's rival cousin Bull Bear tried to overthrow him as the main chief in 1834, he did not succeed. Instead he became the first chief of the Eastern Oglalas, when Smoke separated the tribe into two divisions, Kiyaska and Itéšiča bands. The Kiyaska name meaning "Cutt Offs" came about when Smoke told Bull Bear and his followers that they were cut off from the tribe. The Itéšiča name meaning "Bad Faces" originated from when Bull Bear threw some dust in the face of Smoke after he told Bull Bear that he been cut off. His longstanding feud with Bull Bear which resulted in Bull Bear's death by the hands of Red Cloud in 1841. Chief Smoke's headdress wasn't just another ordinary headdress. In fact it wasn't like any other chief's headdress it was amazingly detailed and designed with the finest and longest eagle feathers available. It was longer than Chief Touch the Clouds's headdress, and it had special significance. Indeed, it was most honored and sacred among the Lakotas. When Chief Smoke stood or walked in full headdress, there was a magnificent train of eagle feathers trailing or dragging on the ground for many feet behind him. He earned these eagle feathers one by one. The Lakota people made and awarded him this headdress for his status as a great warrior as well as his many good deeds and a life devoted to and for his people. Chief Smoke's height was 6 feet 5 inches, and he weighed at least 250 pounds and was robust.

== Family ==
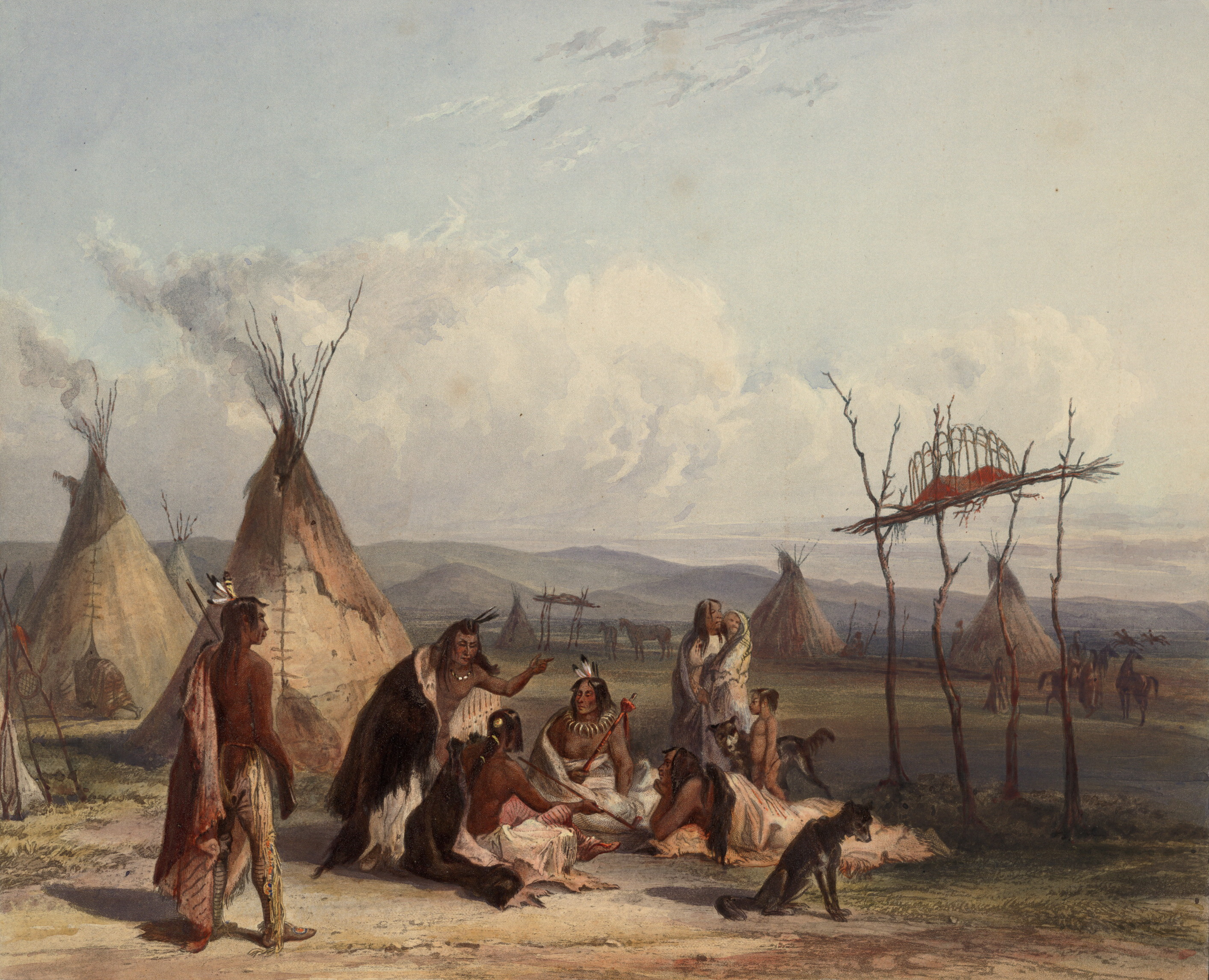
In 1864, Old Chief Smoke died and was placed on a scaffold near sight of Ft. Laramie.

Chief Smoke is also noted for having had five wives; Looking Cloud Woman of the Teton Mnikȟówožu, Comes Out Slow Woman of the Teton Oglála, Burnt Her Woman of the Teton Sičháŋǧu, Yellow Haired Woman of the Southern Cheyenne, and Brown Eyes Woman of the Teton Húŋkpapȟa. His children included Spotted Horse Woman, Chief Man Afraid of His Horses I, Chief Red Cloud was his "nephew" and was raised by Smoke after his parents' deaths, Chief Bull Bear III, Chief Solomon "Smoke" II, Chief American Horse I, Chief Big Mouth, Chief Blue Horse, Woman Dress, and Chief No Neck. He also had a daughter, Ulala. Eight out of nine sons of the old Chief Smoke were prominent chiefs of a band of the Lakotas. Big Mouth and Blue Horse were twin brothers and they were born in the same year as their cousin Chief Red Cloud, 1822.

Spotted Horse Woman was from Smoke's first wife Looking Cloud Woman, Man Afraid of His Horses I and Solomon "Smoke" II was from Smoke's second wife Comes Out Slow Woman, Big Mouth and Blue Horse was from Smoke's third wife Burnt Her Woman, American Horse I and Woman Dress was from Smoke's fourth wife Yellow Haired Woman, No Neck was from Smoke's fifth wife Brown Eyes Woman.

The Smoke family was the most prominent and recognized family of the Lakotas during the 18th and 19th centuries. He was one of the last great Shirt Wearers, a highly prestigious Lakota warrior society. In 1864 before Chief Smoke died, he gave his War Shirt as a gift to Col. William O. Collins after the visit that Col. Collins made to the Smoke's camp. Col. Collins sent the shirt to the Smithsonian Institution as a donation in 1866. The shirt is presently in the collections of the National Museum of Natural History: Catalog No. E1851, Department of Anthropology.

The last chiefs in the original dynasty of Oglala headmen starting with the great Chief Smoke (1774–1864) were Frank Afraid of His Horses (1856–1943, his chieftainship 1900–1943) and Wendell Smoke (1876–1920, his chieftainship 1895–1920).

== Death ==
Chief Smoke died in 1864 near modern-day Fort Laramie, Wyoming at the age of 89, from natural causes of old age. A few days after his death, Army Surgeon Lt. Colonel Henry Schell, stationed at Fort Laramie, removed the body of Chief Smoke and sent it to the Smithsonian Institution Museum. In 1994, 130 years later, the remains of Chief Smoke were returned to the Smoke family, and they buried him by the town of Porcupine, South Dakota.

== See also ==
- Pine Ridge Indian Reservation
- Chief Lone Horn
- Chief Young Man Afraid of His Horses
- Chief Little Wound
- Chief White Bull
