= Sixkiller =

Sixkiller is a Cherokee surname. Notable people with the surname include:

- Sam Sixkiller (1842–1886), Native American leader
- Sonny Sixkiller (born 1951), American football player and sports commentator
