= Big Mouth (chief) =

First son of old chief smoke (1774-1864)

- Itȟáŋka
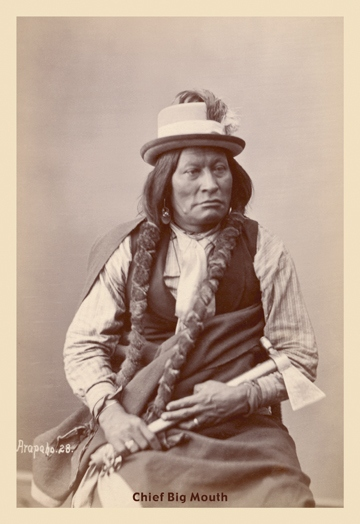

Oglala-born leader of the Brulé Lakota leader

Personal details
- Born: c. 1822
- Died: October 29, 1869
- Relations: Twin brother of Blue Horse
- Parent: Old Chief Smoke

Big Mouth (Lakota: Itȟáŋka) (c. 1822—October 29, 1869) was an Oglala-born leader of the Brulé Lakota, regarded by the Brulé for his bravery and aggressive military leadership. He was one of the signers of the second Treaty of Fort Laramie in 1868 and remained a bitter opponent of further American settlement, ridiculing Spotted Tail and other Sioux leaders upon their return from a mission to Washington, D.C. He was the first son of Old Chief Smoke (1774–1864) and his third wife, Burnt Her Woman. His twin brother was Blue Horse.

One of the principal leaders at the Whetstone Indian Agency, located along the Missouri River, where most of the Brulé and Oglala bands had gathered, Big Mouth gained increasing support for his stance among members of the tribe. He criticized what he described as Spotted Tail's reversal of Sioux policy, saying Spotted Tail had been entertained by American politicians and given a personal tour through the major cities of the East Coast of the United States. Faced with increasing opposition to his leadership, Spotted Tail visited Big Mouth at his lodge, where, upon approaching the entrance, Big Mouth was seized by two warriors and held down while Spotted Tail shot and killed him.

== Early years ==
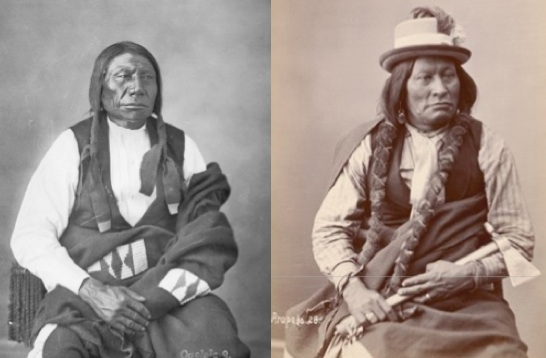
Blue Horse and his twin brother, Big Mouth

Big Mouth and Blue Horse both served as Indian policemen in Old Chief Smoke's civil administration at Ft. Laramie, Wyoming around 1864. Big Mouth became headman with Blue Horse of the Wagluhe Band of the Oglala Lakota upon the death of Old Chief Smoke in 1864.

== Later years and murder ==
Big Mouth opposed Spotted Tail's Lakota leadership and criticized his negotiations with Washington politicians. On October 29, 1869, Spotted Tail called at the door of Big Mouth's lodge, and asked to speak with him. On his appearance, he was seized by two warriors, who held him fast, while Spotted Tail drew a pistol, placed it against his body, and shot Big Mouth dead. Captain DeWitt C. Poole at the Whetstone Indian Agency reported Blue Horse's shock and anger to Big Mouth's murder. "Blue Horse started a violent harangue in the Sioux language. He had a rifle in one hand and a strung bow and a bunch of arrows in the other, and when he dropped his blanket, two navy Colts and a big scalping knife could be seen in their sheaths at his belt. He was in a raving fury, leaping and bounding about the room as he hurled accusations and threats at Chief Spotted Tail. Chief Big Mouth died toward dawn. Some hours later, Blue Horse came to agent Poole's office and told him that he felt so sad over the death of his great and good brother that he would have to wash off the paint he had put on his face for the feast the day before and begin mourning. The interpreter warned Poole that if this Indian washed his face and started mourning, it would mean the reopening of the feud and more shootings. The agent would give Blue Horse two blankets, that would comfort him, and he would refrain from washing his face and going gunning for Spotted Tail. The blankets were handed over, and the grieving brother went quietly away." Poole later reported that Spotted Tail made a prompt payment of a stipulated number of ponies to Blue Horse and that aboriginal law had been vindicated.

Blue Horse, Big Mouth's twin brother, was pressed to avenge the murder, but chose the path of non-violence and instead moved with his Wagluhe band to another locality. Red Cloud was also aggrieved by his brother's murder. Nonetheless, Red Cloud continued to work with Spotted Tail in delegations to Washington, D.C. to protect tribal lands, enforce broken treaties and preserve Lakota culture.

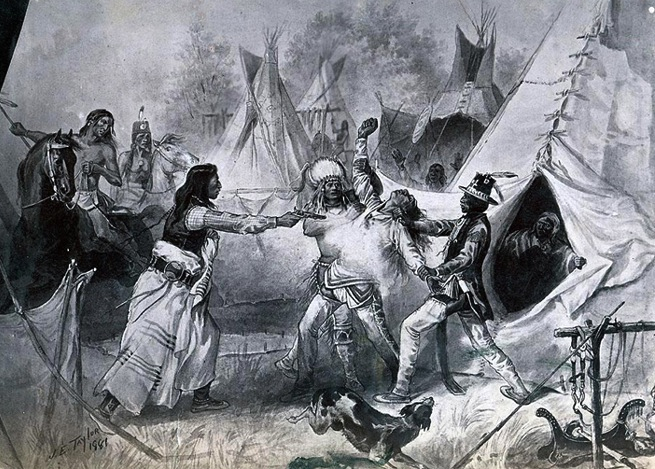
The Murder of Big Mouth by Spotted Tail, 1869

== Notes ==
Sources

- Grant, Bruce. The Concise Encyclopedia of the American Indian. New York: Wings Books, 2000. ISBN 0-517-69310-0
- Spartacus Educational:Spotted Tail
