= Little Wound School =

K-12 Lakota school in South Dakota, United States

Coordinates: 43.4257°N 102.1746°W

Little Wound School (Lakota: Taopi Cikala Owayawa) is a tribal K-12 school in Kyle, South Dakota. It is affiliated with the Bureau of Indian Education (BIE). It is located in the Pine Ridge Indian Reservation. It is named after Little Wound.

In 2001 the school started a cable television station.

In 2015 the school had 900 students. That year the Minneapolis Star Tribune stated that it was one of four BIE schools in the Pine Ridge community with a building deemed to be in a "poor condition". The gymnasium was built in 1939. The editorial board added that the school had portable buildings unused due to deterioration and that it "lacks separate restrooms and other facilities needed to maintain student discipline and privacy."

By November 2015 the school community experienced a suicide epidemic involving 12 suicides. In 2015 the United States Department of Education gave the school a $325,000 grant to address this.

== Athletics ==
The elementary division has a boxing club. The school pays for the program, making it one of the few such programs in the state.
