= Kyle, South Dakota =

Kyle Pȟežúta Ȟáka (Lakota)
- CDP
- Location in Oglala Lakota County and the state of South Dakota
- Coordinates: 43°25′28″N 102°10′48″W
- Country: United States
- State: South Dakota
- County: Oglala Lakota

Area
  - Total: 1.53 sq mi (3.95 km^{2})
  - Land: 1.47 sq mi (3.82 km^{2})
  - Water: 0.050 sq mi (0.13 km^{2})
- Elevation: 2,910 ft (890 m)

Population (2020)
  - Total: 943
  - Density: 639.5/sq mi (246.92/km^{2})
- Time zone: UTC-7 (Mountain (MST))
  - Summer (DST): UTC-6 (MDT)
- ZIP code: 57752
- Area code: 605
- FIPS code: 46-34460
- GNIS feature ID: 2393072

Kyle (Lakota: Pȟežúta Ȟáka; "Branched Medicine") is a census-designated place (CDP) in Oglala Lakota County, South Dakota, United States. Its population was 943 at the 2020 census. Located within the Pine Ridge Indian Reservation of the Oglala Lakota, it is one of two settlements which are closest to the North American continental pole of inaccessibility.

The community was named for James H. Kyle, a Senator from South Dakota.

== Geography ==
According to the United States Census Bureau, the CDP has a total area of 2.0 square miles (5.2 km^{2}), all land.

== Demographics ==
Historical population
Census	Pop.	Note	%±
1990	914		—
2000	970		6.1%
2010	846		−12.8%
2020	943		11.5%
U.S. Decennial Census

As of the census of 2000, there were 970 people, 205 households, and 168 families residing in the CDP. The population density was 481.3 inhabitants per square mile (185.8/km^{2}). There were 219 housing units at an average density of 108.7 per square mile (42.0/km^{2}). The racial makeup of the CDP was 94.43% Native American, 5.15% White, and 0.41% from two or more races. Hispanic or Latino of any race were 1.13% of the population.

There were 205 households, out of which 53.7% had children under the age of 18 living with them, 36.6% were married couples living together, 34.1% had a female householder with no husband present, and 17.6% were non-families. 13.7% of all households were made up of individuals, and 1.0% had someone living alone who was 65 years of age or older. The average household size was 4.46 and the average family size was 4.88.

In the CDP, the population was spread out, with 45.4% under the age of 18, 9.9% from 18 to 24, 29.4% from 25 to 44, 11.5% from 45 to 64, and 3.8% who were 65 years of age or older. The median age was 21 years. For every 100 females, there were 97.2 males. For every 100 females age 18 and over, there were 105.4 males.

The median income for a household in the CDP was $26,750, and the median income for a family was $27,000. Males had a median income of $21,953 versus $13,710 for females. The per capita income for the CDP was $7,415. About 42.1% of families and 35.7% of the population were below the poverty line, including 43.2% of those under age 18 and 17.4% of those age 65 or over.

== Education ==
The Little Wound School is administered by the tribe in association with the Bureau of Indian Education (BIE). It has elementary, middle, and high school grades, with a total of more than 900 students, who are primarily Oglala Lakota in ethnicity.

Oglala Lakota College is a tribal college in Kyle operated by the Lakota Nation.
