= Little Wound =

Oglala Lakota chief (c.1835–1899)

- Tȟaópi Čík’ala
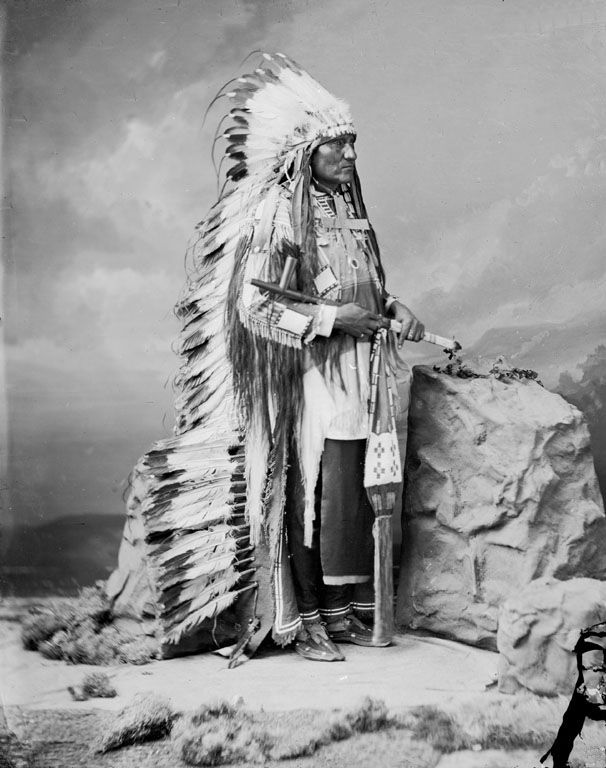
- Little Wound in 1877
- Born: ca. 1835
- Died: Winter 1899
- Citizenship: Oglala Lakota
- Occupations: chief of Kuinyan Kiyuksa Lakota, Indian scout

Little Wound (c. 1835–Winter 1899; Lakota: Tȟaópi Čík’ala) was an Oglala Lakota chief. Following the death of his brother Bull Bear II in 1865 he became leader of the Kuinyan branch of the Kiyuksa band (Bear people).

== Family ==
His father Chief Old Bull Bear, the chief of the Eastern Oglala (Kiyaska) from 1834 to 1841, was killed by Red Cloud near Chugwater, Wyoming in the vicinity of Fort Laramie in 1841. Little Wound's grandfather was Stone Chief, and his son was George Little Wound. Old Chief Smoke (1774–1864) took Little Wound's younger brother, Young Bull Bear III and raised him in the Smoke household awhile after his father Old Bull Bear was killed in 1841.

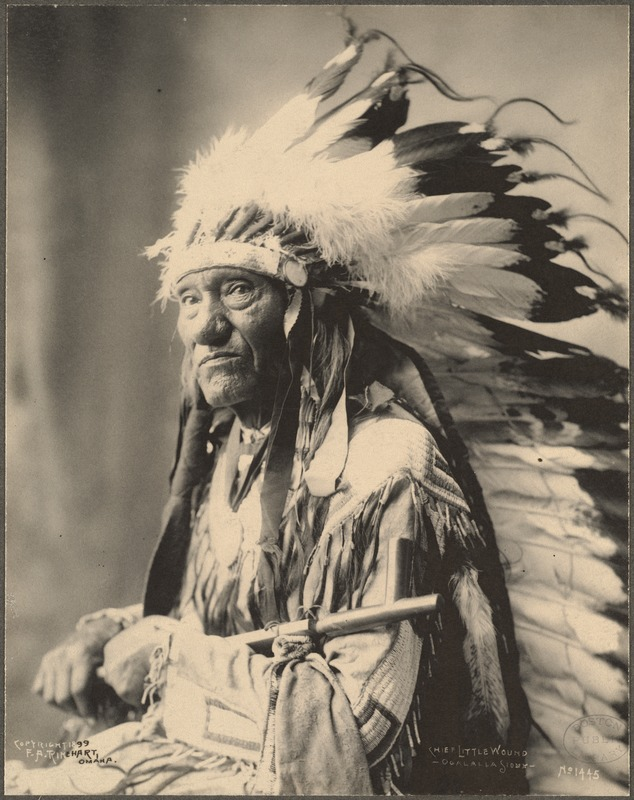
Little Wound in 1899

== Warfare ==
Little Wound was present at the battle of Massacre Canyon on August 5, 1873, in Hitchcock County, Nebraska. It was one of the last battles between the Pawnee and the Sioux and the last large scale battle between Native American tribes in the area of the present day United States of America.

At an Indian scout reorganization at Red Cloud Agency in 1877 the Oglalas formed the majority of Company B, to whose leadership Little Wound was promoted as first sergeant. Major chiefs Red Cloud, Young Man Afraid of His Horses, Yellow Bear and American Horse served as his sergeants. Because of that he became a political opponent to Crazy Horse as well as Red Cloud at the Red Cloud Agency and Camp Robinson agency, and he was not among the ones Crazy Horse tried to elect for a journey to Washington the same fall. Eventually he joined the delegation to Washington which is where the photo on the right was taken.

== Education ==
Little Wound School is named after him.
