= Sam Sixkiller =

Native American leader

- Born: c. 1842; Going Snake District, Cherokee Nation
- Died: December 24, 1886 (aged 43–44); Muskogee, Oklahoma
- Cause of death: Murdered
- Occupation: Police officer
- Years active: 1875–1886
- Title: High Sheriff of the Cherokee Nation; Captain of the United States Indian Police; Special Agent for the Missouri-Pacific Railroad
- Spouse: Fannie Floria Foreman
- Children: 2
- Parents: Red Bird Sixkiller (father); Pamelia Whaley (mother)

Samuel Sixkiller (c. 1842 – December 24, 1886) was a prominent Native American leader during the American Civil War and the reconstruction era.

== Biography ==
Samuel Sixkiller was born about 1842 in the Going Snake District of the Cherokee Nation which is now known as the Adair County in Oklahoma. He was the son of Red Bird Sixkiller (a Cherokee man) and Pamelia Whaley (a white woman). Samuel also had a brother named Lucas Sixkiller. Samuel married Fannie Floria Foreman and had a child named Samuel Rasmus Sixkiller and daughter Fannie Ester 1879-1964. His son Samuel R, was born February 13, 1877, and he graduated from Carlisle University in 1895. The name Sixkiller according to legend came from a fight between the Creeks and the Cherokees where one of Samuel's ancestors killed six men before being killed himself and ever since this name has been passed down.

== Professional life ==
When Samuel Sixkiller was eighteen years old he supported the Confederacy in the Civil War. He was a private in the 1st Cherokee Cavalry. When Samuel was nineteen years old he decided to switch his allegiance and fight for the Union alongside his father 1st Lt. Red Bird Sixkiller. By 1875 Samuel was appointed to the positions of High Sheriff of the Cherokee Nation and Warden of the National Penitentiary (See Indian Police). By holding this position Samuel Sixkiller became the authority of the Cherokee Nation and upheld peace within the tribes. Also at the time he was a Deputy United States Marshal. This was valuable to the government because he would be able chase fugitives onto tribal land. On February 12, 1880 Samuel became the first Captain of the United States Indian Police in Muskogee (Indian Territory). By holding this position Sixkiller was in command of forty men. One of the duties he had was patrolling Muskogee. Historians say that this town was one of the craziest in all of the "Wild West". There were more murders within a fifty-mile radius of Muskogee than anywhere west of the Mississippi river. In addition to being a Captain he was also a Special Agent for the Missouri-Pacific Railroad. Since the train went through the area where Sixkiller patrolled it made sense that he worked as a special agent for the railroad. Sixkiller's main problems were the whiskey bootleggers, cattle thieves, murders, rapists, timber thieves, land squatters, train robbers, card sharps, and prostitutes servicing the railroad towns.

== Indian police ==
In 1808 the Cherokee Nation embraced the idea of a police force that would protect. The force was created to protect people from robbery, horses from being stolen, as well as widows and orphans. If anyone was to resist the authority of these men they were to be killed. During this time, the Cherokee Nation was in the Southern United States. After the Trail of Tears (Indian Removal Policy) and the move to the West, a formal authority was created in a police force and a judicial system. The prison system was created in 1873 by an act of the Cherokee National Council. This was the only facility of its kind up until 1901. The position of High Sheriff of the Cherokee Nation was established and filled in 1875. It housed, sentenced, or accused prisoners from all throughout the territory.

== End of watch ==
On Christmas Eve in 1886, Samuel Sixkiller went into Muskogee to pick up medicine. Sixkiller was off duty and unarmed at the time. While on his way to Turner & Byrne's store he was confronted by two men by the names of Dick Vann and Alf Cunningham. Before running into Sixkiller the two men tried to purchase guns from the store but the owner refused because both men were drunk. The two men decided to attack Marshal Keys, a local lawman and steal his weapons. The two men supposedly had a grudge from a previous run in with Sixkiller weeks before. Vann and Cunningham were armed with a shotgun and a pistol. Sixkiller managed to knock away the gun of Cunningham before being shot by Vann multiple times. He was dead on the scene. The two men then jumped onto their horses and left town. The pursuing men did not find the gunmen. Some state that justice was eventually found by Samuel Sixkiller's son Lucas. A funeral was held the following Sunday. Lawmen from across the territory attended the funeral and even overflowed the church. The procession following the service was one of the largest ever assembled in that part of the country.

== Legislation ==
After the death of Captain Samuel Sixkiller, President Grover Cleveland signed a bill that made assault against an Indian policeman a federal offense. The document signed March 2, 1887, stated: "…any Indians committing against the person of any Indian policeman appointed under the laws of the United States, or any Indian United States deputy Marshal, any of the following crimes, namely murder, manslaughter or assault with intent to kill, within the Indian Territory, shall be subjected to the laws of the United States relating to such crimes and shall be tried by the District Court of the United States." This landmark case increased the stature of Indian police officers in Indian Territory and everywhere in the United States.

== Famous stories ==
One of the biggest outlaws who Samuel Sixkiller took down in the territory was Dick Glass, a notorious outlaw who led a gang of horse rustlers and bootleggers. Glass sold the stolen horses and obtained illegal whiskey from Texas and brought it back across the Red River to sell for a substantial profit. In 1885, Sixkiller put a group of men together which included another famous lawman named Charles LeFlore. The plan was to ambush Glass and his crew in Colbert (Chickasaw Nation). Just as was suspected, Glass had smuggled whiskey with him when they fell into the trap set by Sixkiller and LeFlore. Samuel Sixkiller killed Glass just before he was able to draw his pistol. The rest of the gang was either killed or arrested during the firefight.
