= Tasunka Kokipapi =

Oglala Lakota Leader (1836-1893)

They Fear Even His Horses
- Tȟašúŋke Kȟokípȟapi
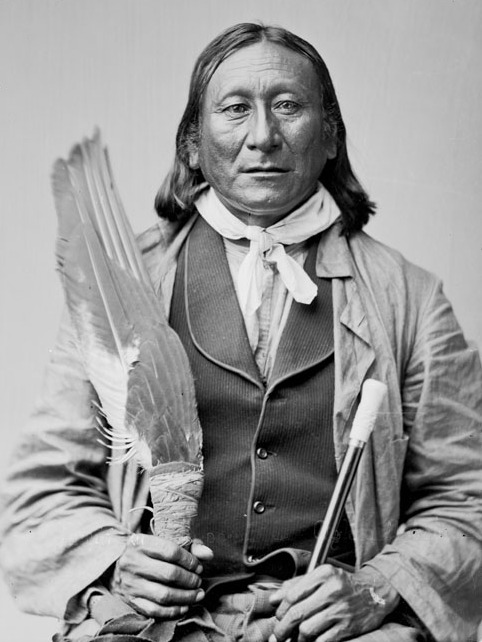
- They Fear Even His Horses, 1884

Oglala Sioux chief leader
- Preceded by: Old Man They Fear Even His Horses

Personal details
- Born: c. 1836
- Died: July 13, 1893 (aged 56–57) near Newcastle, Wyoming, United States
- Resting place: Makansan Presbyterian Cemetery near Oglala, South Dakota
- Parent: Chief Old Man They Fear Even His Horses (1808–1889)
- Known for: Fought under Red Cloud in Red Cloud's War; negotiator for the Sioux Nation after the Wounded Knee Massacre; served on delegations to Washington, D.C.

Tasunka Kokipapi (Lakota: Tȟašúŋke Kȟokípȟapi, 1836 – July 13, 1893) was an Oglala Lakota leader known for his participation in Red Cloud's War, as a negotiator for the Sioux Nation after the Wounded Knee Massacre, and for serving on delegations to Washington, D.C.. A proper translation of his name is They Fear Even His Horses or His Horse Is Feared, meaning that the bearer of the name was so feared in battle that even the sight of his horse would inspire fear. During and after his lifetime, American sources and written records mistranslated his name as Young Man Afraid of His Horses or uncommonly as His Horses Are Afraid.

== Early life ==
Tasunka Kokipapi was born about 1836 into a distinguished family of Oglala headmen. According to his father, Young Tasunka Kokipapi was the fourth in a direct line of Oglala chiefs to bear the name, which translates to English as They Fear His Horse.

Indian agent James McLaughlin noted in his memoir the poor translation of the lineage of leaders who bore the name Tasunka Kokipapi: "And this brings me to one feature of the Indian nomenclature that is worthy of attention — the misleading character of the translations. Tasunka-Kokipapi is by no means to be rendered 'Young-Man-Afraid-of-his-Horses.' I do not know that the translator could have gone much further astray from the meaning of the name, if he had tried. The name implies a tribute of great esteem on the part of the Indian for the man who bore it, the meaning of Tasunka-Kokipapi indicating one whose capacity in battle was such that the mere sight of his horses inspired fear in his enemies."

After the Younger Tasunka Kokipapi became a renowned Lakota warrior and headman in his own right, his father became known as Old Man They Fear Even His Horses (1808–1889). The elder Tasunka Kokipapi served for many years as a headman and chief of the Hunkpatila band of Oglala, but about 1870, as uncertainty over how to deal with American incursions created turmoil among the Lakota, elder Tasunka Kokipapi turned most duties of leading the Hunkpatilas to his son. In 1871, the Oglala split over the creation of the Great Sioux Reservation. The followers of the Younger Tasunka Kokipapi settled permanently at the Red Cloud Agency, later the Pine Ridge Agency. The non-treaty Oglala faction retained the Hunkpatila name and remained in the Powder River country, and Young Tasunka Kokipapi's band became known as the Payabya band.

== Rise to leadership ==
The brutality of the Sand Creek Massacre on 29 November 1864 brought war to the South Platte River Valley, as the Cheyenne, Lakota, and Arapaho retaliated for the attack on a peaceful village of mostly women, children, and old men. On 7 January 1865, a combined force of 1000 warriors attacked the stagecoach station at Julesburg, Colorado, and they continued raiding throughout the South Platte region for several weeks. The younger Tasunka Kokipapi emerged as a leading Oglala warrior during these raids. The U.S. Army's construction of forts along the Bozeman Trail beginning in 1866 to protect settlers infuriated the Lakota and Cheyenne, as they refused to accept the white presence in their prime hunting grounds. The U.S. officials invited the Lakota and Cheyenne leaders to a council at Fort Laramie to obtain right-of-way from the Lakota for the forts and road, but during the conference, a regiment of infantry troops arrived to build Fort Phil Kearny without the Lakota giving their consent. This duplicity enraged Old Man They Fear Even His Horses and Red Cloud, and most of the Lakota stormed out of the council in anger. These events precipitated Red Cloud's War of 1866–1868, the only Indian war to end in defeat for the United States. Tasunka Kokipapi served as an instrumental war leader during this conflict.

He played an important role in the Lakota victory at the Battle of the Hundred Slain (known as the Fetterman Fight to the whites). At the Wagon Box Fight of 2 August 1867, Tasunka Kokipapi served along with Crazy Horse as the leaders of the combined Lakota/Cheyenne war party. In 1868, the multiband Oglala council bestowed one of their highest honors upon Tasunka Kokipapi, investing him, along with American Horse, Crazy Horse, and Sword Owner (later George Sword) as the Oglala's four head shirtwearers or protectors of the people. They were the last four head Oglala shirtwearers. In the 1930s, the official interpreter at the Pine Ridge Agency stated that Tasunka Kokipapi was the only one of the four who kept his shirt until his death.

== Resistance to assimilation ==
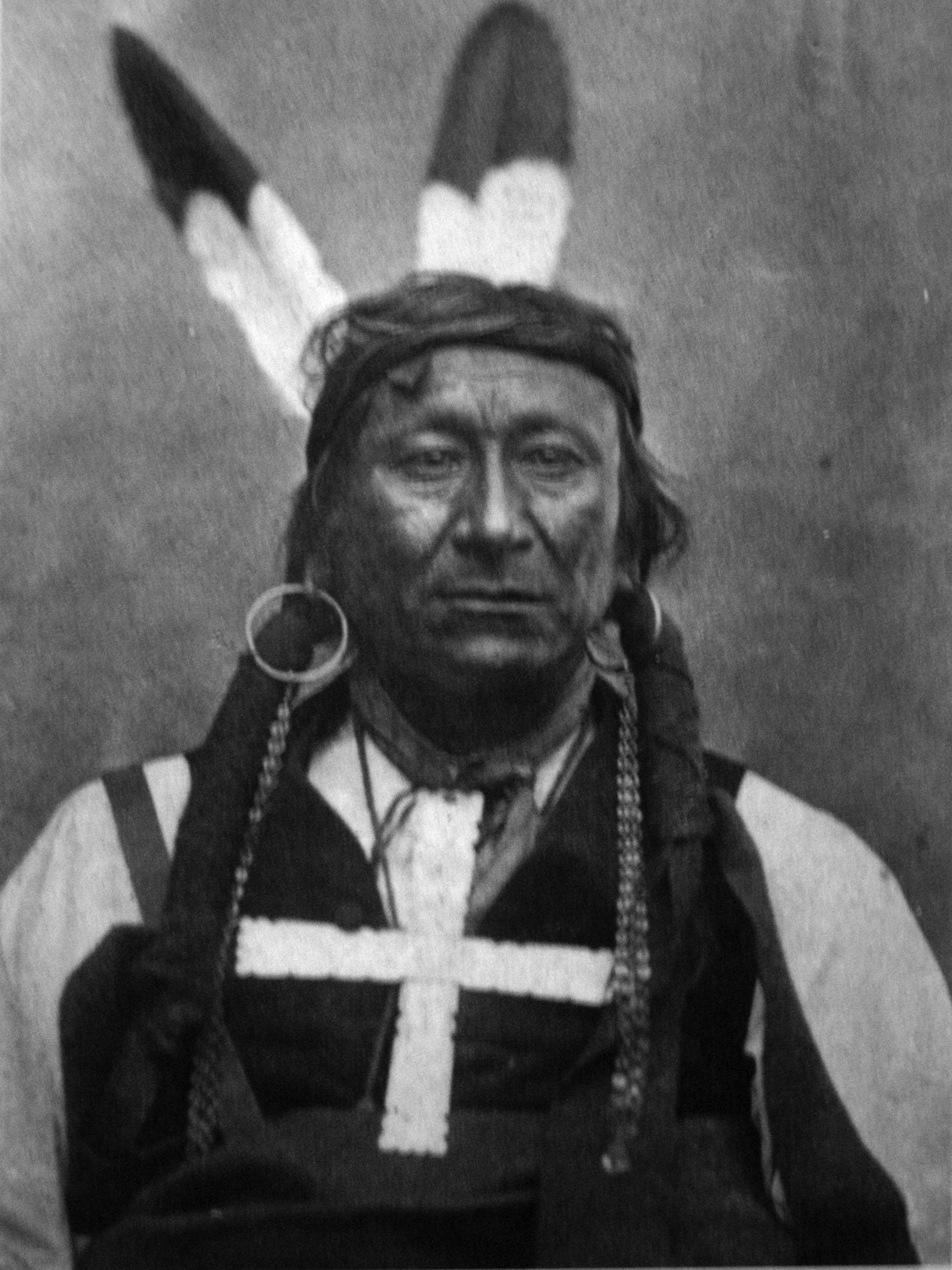
Tasunka Kokipapi, 1890

It appears that both Tasunka Kokipapi and his father signed the Treaty of Fort Laramie of 1868 which ended Red Cloud's War, but they had no intention of leaving their Powder River hunting grounds to permanently settle on the Great Sioux Reservation, at least initially. The influx of white pioneers had managed to drive away most of the game which sustained the Lakota nomadic lifestyle, particularly the large buffalo herds. By the early 1870s, during many winters the Hunkpatila suffered considerably from hunger. By the latter part of 1871, the Oglala split, with Tasunka Kokipapi and his father, as well as Red Cloud, leading their followers to the Red Cloud Agency.

After settling on the Great Sioux Reservation, Tasunka Kokipapi worked tirelessly to help preserve his people's land and culture. He countered the obstructionist policy of Red Cloud that led to constant conflict between Red Cloud and the U.S. agent during the 1880s. While Tasunka Kokipapi maintained friendly relations with the whites and Federal government, he remained a staunch supporter of Lakota rights, repeatedly asking for compensation for the loss of the Black Hills, buffalo, and other game. He attended several delegations to Washington, D.C., for improved treatment as well as an acting negotiator with federal authorities to assist the Lakota people in adjusting to reservation life. For three years, he served as President of the Pine Ridge Board of Councilmen.

Along with most of the Lakota, Tasunka Kokipapi resisted the push from the government for his tribe to become commercial farmers. He merely cultivated a small garden patch and began raising livestock, raising cattle, horses, and turkeys. He also frequently left the reservation to hunt and roam about the prairie, sometimes on forays of several months. During this period, he made peace with his former bitter enemies, the Crow Nation, and visited them regularly for the remainder of his life. Although he resigned himself to working with the whites to help his people, he remained a staunchly traditional Lakota. He only spoke his native language, had two wives, and fought bitterly to help his people retain the Lakota lands during the 1880s. As the government began attempts to break up the Great Sioux Reservation in the 1880s, Tasunka Kokipapi reconciled with Red Cloud and ceased his cooperation with the Pine Ridge agents. During the latter 1880s, the two Oglala leaders, together with Little Wound and the revered old Hunkpatila chief, Old Man They Fear Even His Horses, now aged 81, led the opposition to Congressional efforts to take a large swath of Lakota land and sell it to white settlers. Although they succeeded in defeating the proposal at Pine Ridge, white pressure led to its overall passage.

The loss of their land hit the Lakota hard, and Congress compounded their problems in 1889 when it voted to reduce their beef issue by 20%. The drought of 1890 caused many of the Lakota cattle to die, and as hunger prevailed among most of the people, their lowered resistance caused diseases to flourish. Although Tasunka Kokipapi was a realist and knew that the whites had destroyed the buffalo and now surrounded the Oglala, he lamented upon his people's misery as they became increasingly hungry and desperate. Like many of the Lakota, he longed for the old days:

There was a time when we did not have to assume the character of beggars ... Then we were free to go where we pleased while now we are penned up like so many cattle ... There was a time when the buffalo covered our plains and furnished us with all the meat we needed. Now they are gone, wantonly destroyed by the white man and we are obliged to beg for something to take their place.

== Ghost Dance delegation and conflict ==
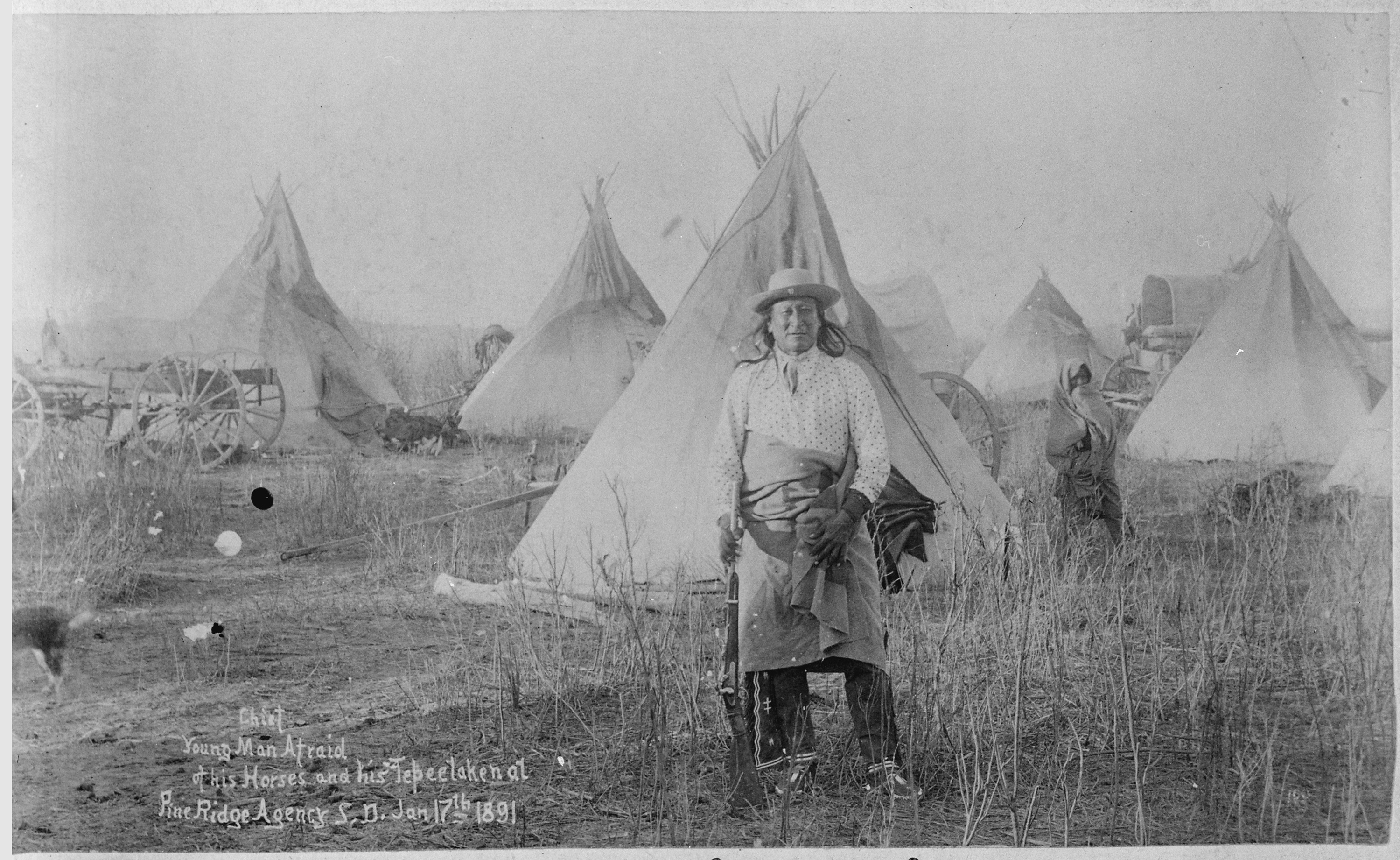
January 17, 1891: Tasunka Kokipapi at Camp of Oglala tribe of Lakota at Pine Ridge, South Dakota, three weeks after Wounded Knee Massacre

Extreme desperation and disillusionment always forms a fertile environment for the spread of evangelical religious movements, and the Ghost Dance promises of reuniting with dead loved ones, resurrection of the buffalo, and unity among Indians throughout the region now held special appeal to the Lakota. Pine Ridge Agency leaders Tasunka Kokipapi, Red Cloud, Little Wound, and American Horse sent a delegation to Nevada to learn more about the Ghost Dance movement, and the delegates brought the new religion to the Pine Ridge Agency in March 1890. Although many Oglala became fervent followers, Tasunka Kokipapi never embraced the religion. In fact, he actively opposed the Ghost Dance. Tensions rapidly built and fearful of an uprising, the government officials overreacted and sent troops to Pine Ridge. Perhaps sensing the unrest and wanting no part in it, during the latter months of 1890, Tasunka Kokipapi took his band and left the reservation on an extended hunt and planned visit to the Crows in Wyoming. As a result, he played no role during the killing of Sitting Bull, the brutal slaying of Spotted Elk's band at the Wounded Knee Massacre, or the subsequent departure of the Ghost Dancers to their stronghold in the Badlands.

General Nelson A. Miles sent for Tasunka Kokipapi to confer with those "hostile" Lakota camped in the Badlands to defuse the situation. Finished with his hunt, upon learning of the massacre of the Lakota and of General Miles' request, Tasunka Kokipapi agreed to postpone his visit and return to Pine Ridge. To expedite his return, Miles sent a cavalry escort to rush them back. Tasunka Kokipapi twice went to the hostile camp, and on 14 January 1891, he escorted Ghost Dance leaders Little Wound, Two Strike, Little Hawk, Crow Dog, and Kicking Bear to meet with General Miles, and tensions soon dissipated. Within 36 hours of his arrival, Tasunka Kokipapi had managed to defuse the conflict. As payback for his last diplomatic endeavor as a peacemaker for his people and mediator between the Lakota and General Miles, some of the former Ghost Dancers burned his house and stole some of his livestock.

On 7 January 1891, a young Sicangu Lakota, Plenty Horse, shot and killed Lt. Edward W. Casey while the officer scouted the "hostile" camp movements. A few days later, a group of South Dakota cowboys ambushed a small group of Tasunka Kokipapi's band led by Few Tails who had continued to hunt. The Oglala party consisted of Few Tails, five other men, two women, including Few Tails' wife, twelve ponies, and two wagons. They carried no guns. Early on the morning of January 11, the cowboys ambushed the Oglala. Few Tails fell dead immediately, and his wife was shot in the leg and chest. She crawled to the bushes to hide and later walked nearly one hundred miles back to the Pine Ridge Agency. After the effort he had made as peacemaker for the whites, the unprovoked murder of his kinsman initially infuriated Tasunka Kokipapi, who, upon learning of the slaughter, reportedly "... scowled, and for a few moments refused to be pacified ..." General Miles again requested Tasunka Kokipapi's help, this time to apprehend the murderers of Lt. Casey and the agency herder, Henry Miller, killed by Sicangu warrior Kills the Enemy, to have them as well as the cowboys who killed Few Tails tried in the courts. Tasunka Kokipapi refused, and replied to Miles:

No, I will not surrender them: but if you will bring the white men who killed Few Tails, I will bring the Indians who killed the white soldier and the herder; and right out here in front of your tepee I will have my young men shoot the Indians and you have your soldiers shoot the white men, and then we will be done with the whole business; They were all bad men.

Miles refused Tasunka Kokipapi's offer.

== Death ==
In July 1893, Tasunka Kokipapi left the reservation on a visit to his former enemies, the Crow. Around noon on July 13, near Newcastle, Wyoming, he suffered a heart attack or stroke and fell dead from his horse, at the age of 56. He was buried with military honors in the cemetery at the Pine Ridge Agency.
