= United States Indian Police =

United States Indian Protection Organization

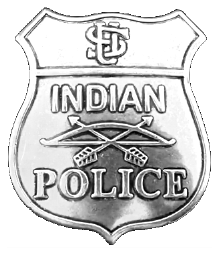
U.S. Indian Police badge ca. 1890

The United States Indian Police (USIP) was organized in 1880 by John Q. Tufts, the Indian Commissioner in Muskogee, Indian Territory, to police the Five Civilized Tribes. Their mission is to "provide justice services and technical assistance to federally recognized Indian tribes." Following its establishment, the USIP recruited many of its Police Officers from the ranks of the existing Indian Lighthorsemen. Unlike the Lighthorsemen, who were under the jurisdiction of individual tribes, the USIP operated under the authority of the Indian Agent assigned to the Union Agency. Many US Indian Police Officers were granted Special Deputy U.S. Marshal commissions, enabling them to cross jurisdictional boundaries and arrest non-Indians.

== United States Indian Police Academy ==
The United States Indian Police Academy was originally established as the United States Indian Police Training and Research Center in Roswell, New Mexico on December 17, 1968. The program was administered by the Thiokol Chemical Corporation during the academy's period in Roswell and specialized to include the training of juvenile detention, criminal investigation and supervisors. In 1973, the academy was relocated to Brigham City, Utah to be combined with the Division of Law and Order Research and Statistical Unit from Pierre, South Dakota. The result was the creation of the Center for U.S. Indian Police Training and Research. The academy relocated to Marana, Arizona in 1984. In 1993, it was relocated again to the Federal Law Enforcement Training Center grounds in Artesia, New Mexico, where it remains to this day.

Today, the United States Indian Police Academy caters their training to the needs of the Indian Country Justice Services. The academy is designed to teach future USIP Police Officers how to fulfill the unit's mission to "prevent crimes, reduce recidivism and support tribal justice systems". The positions generally filled by graduates include Police Officers, Correctional Officers, Criminal Investigators, Tribal Court staff and Telecommunication Equipment Operators. Steven Juneau is the current Academy Director and Osceola Red Shirt is the Deputy Academy Director.

== Jurisdiction ==
The USIP was given authority over cases of manslaughter, murder, assault, rape, arson, and burglary in Native American communities with the passage of the Major Crimes Act of 1885, now codified as 18 U.S.C. 1153. However, the role of the USIP was often unclear and there was a continual need for new acts to increase its jurisdiction because of a lack of prior planning. The power of the United States Indian Police to arrest whites, half-Indians and those outside the reservation of their jurisdiction were continually challenged. This power was questioned in the case of U.S. v. Clapox, but the decision was left unclear. Maintenance of prohibition in Indian territory was passed in what is now 18 USC 1152, 1156, and 1161. These being passed further gave the USIP jurisdiction over non-Indians as the majority of bootleggers were Caucasian, though most of those arrested by the officers were their Native American customers who did not have the same access to quality attorneys. The 1913 Appropriation Act gave United States Indian Police the same powers as U.S. Marshals. The Johnson v. Gerald's case, 234 U.S. 422, further solidified the confiscation powers of the USIP in a decision about whether it was the place of the USIP to take or destroy Indian-made beverages or products.

== Pre-USIP law enforcement ==
While some tribes later policed by the United States Indian Police did not give individuals law enforcement responsibilities and made order a community effort, others had institutions similar to police. The Muscogee Creek had an organization whose purpose was to enforce the laws created by the tribe. The group was composed of warriors who had reached a certain level of renown. The Cherokee had both their own form of police, the Lighthorse, and the court system. In fact, the attempt to replace the pre-existing law enforcement of the Native American tribes was marked by opposition from many tribes. The Commissioner received a letter from an agent of another Indian police force about the difficulties he'd met with Sioux opposition. "[T]here have existed among the Sioux and other tribes, native soldier organizations systematically governed by laws and regulations. Some of the opposition encountered in endeavoring to organize the police force in the spring of 1879 was from these native soldier organizations."

== Interaction with outlaws ==
One of the major setbacks for the United States Indian Police was the activity of prominent Western outlaw gangs, including the Cooks, the Starrs and the Daltons. One of the members of the Dalton Gang, Bob Dalton, used his position as Chief of the Osage Police to the benefit of his and his gang's bootlegging careers. The Dalton Gang was also well known for murder as well as bank and train robberies, using Indian Territory to evade Oklahoma Territory law enforcement. These groups would often fire upon USIP officers so as not to be captured and their bootlegging drew Native Americans under USIP jurisdiction into criminal activity as they consumed illegal goods the groups smuggled in. The outlaw problem became so dire that, in 1895, the Indian policy for Officers included instructions for how to handle outlaws: "Arrest all outlaws, thieves and murderers in your section, and if they resist you will shoot them on the spot."

== Sam Sixkiller ==
Sam Sixkiller was a former High Sheriff of the Cherokee Nation who was recruited to become the Captain of the US Indian Police in 1880. In 1886 two Indians killed Sam Sixkiller, the Captain of the US Indian Police and a Deputy US Marshal commissioned by the Judicial District of Western Arkansas. He was known for surviving multiple gun battles over six years of service, he was unarmed when he was shot on a Christmas Eve. After the killers escaped indictment by the Creek and Cherokee, Congress passed a law (24 Stat., 463.) giving the United States district courts jurisdiction over any Indian who committed a crime against a federally appointed Indian police officer or United States Deputy Marshal. His death also resulted in a law making it a federal offense to kill an Indian police officer, which is still in effect. (18 U.S.C. 1114.)

== Other Indian police ==
There were two other types of police officers on the reservations:

- Indian tribal police
  Several Indian tribes replaced hereditary chiefs with constitutional governments. These tribes hired police officers under a number of different titles—sheriffs, constables, regulators, lighthorsemen, etc.—to enforce tribal laws.
- Indian agency police
  Many tribes had no recognizable governments and therefore no tribal laws. On these reservations, the Indian agent assigned to the tribe hired Indian police from among tribal members to affect law and order according to Federal, agency, and treaty rules. These were considered federally appointed police officers. The Indian police that killed Sitting Bull were of this kind.

== See also ==
- List of federal law enforcement agencies
- Tribal sovereignty in the United States
- Bad men clause
- Indian country jurisdiction
- Major Crimes Act
