= Fort Laramie, Wyoming =

- Town
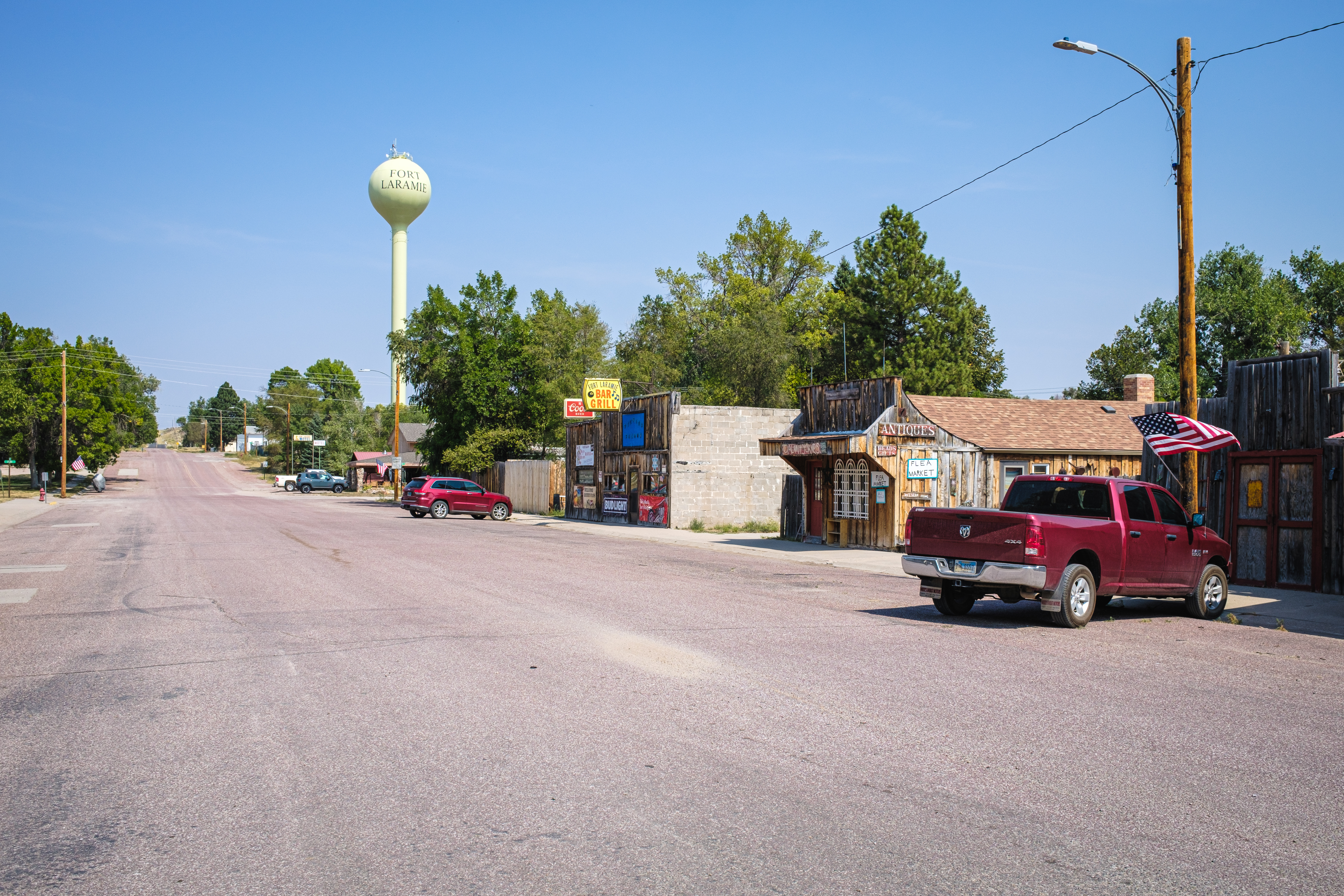
- Downtown Fort Laramie

- Location of Fort Laramie in Goshen County, Wyoming.
- Coordinates: 42°12′47″N 104°31′03″W
- Country: United States
- State: Wyoming
- County: Goshen

Area
  - Total: 0.25 sq mi (0.65 km^{2})
  - Land: 0.25 sq mi (0.65 km^{2})
  - Water: 0 sq mi (0.00 km^{2})
- Elevation: 4,239 ft (1,292 m)

Population (2020)
  - Total: 206
  - Density: 821/sq mi (316.9/km^{2})
- Time zone: UTC-7 (Mountain (MST))
  - Summer (DST): UTC-6 (MDT)
- ZIP code: 82212
- Area code: 307
- FIPS code: 56-28230
- GNIS feature ID: 2412641
- Website: sites.google.com/view/town-of-fort-laramie

Fort Laramie is a town in Goshen County, Wyoming, United States. The population was 206 at the 2020 census. The town is named after historic Fort Laramie, an important stop on the Oregon, California and Mormon trails, as well as a staging point for various military excursions and treaty signings. The old fort was located south of town across the North Platte River, at the mouth of the Laramie River.

== History ==
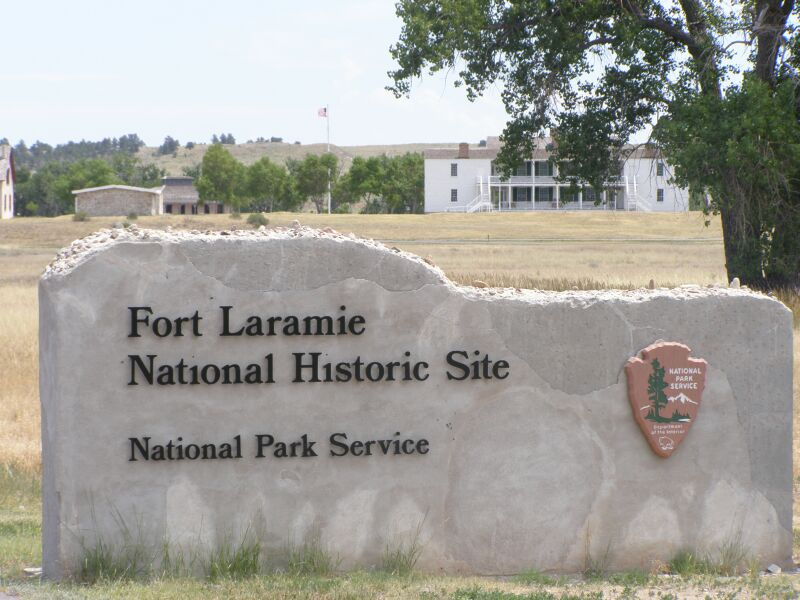
Entrance to Fort Laramie National Historic Site

In 1860, Fort Laramie served as a Pony Express station.

== Geography ==
According to the United States Census Bureau, the town has a total area of 0.25 square miles (0.65 km^{2}), all land.

=== Climate ===
According to the Köppen Climate Classification system, Fort Laramie has a cold semi-arid climate, abbreviated "BSk" on climate maps. The hottest temperature recorded in Fort Laramie was 106 °F (41.1 °C) on July 3, 1990, while the coldest temperature recorded was −40 °F (−40.0 °C) on December 22, 1989.

Climate data for Old Fort Laramie, Wyoming, 1991–2020 normals, extremes 1989–present
Month	Jan	Feb	Mar	Apr	May	Jun	Jul	Aug	Sep	Oct	Nov	Dec	Year
Record high °F (°C)	72 (22)	72 (22)	81 (27)	89 (32)	98 (37)	105 (41)	106 (41)	104 (40)	102 (39)	92 (33)	80 (27)	73 (23)	106 (41)
Mean maximum °F (°C)	61.0 (16.1)	63.4 (17.4)	74.0 (23.3)	81.0 (27.2)	89.1 (31.7)	96.5 (35.8)	100.4 (38.0)	98.8 (37.1)	94.4 (34.7)	84.4 (29.1)	71.4 (21.9)	61.4 (16.3)	101.3 (38.5)
Mean daily maximum °F (°C)	43.0 (6.1)	45.0 (7.2)	54.8 (12.7)	61.9 (16.6)	71.0 (21.7)	82.8 (28.2)	91.0 (32.8)	89.2 (31.8)	79.8 (26.6)	65.2 (18.4)	52.0 (11.1)	42.6 (5.9)	64.9 (18.3)
Daily mean °F (°C)	29.1 (−1.6)	31.0 (−0.6)	39.1 (3.9)	46.0 (7.8)	55.8 (13.2)	66.4 (19.1)	73.8 (23.2)	71.6 (22.0)	61.8 (16.6)	48.2 (9.0)	37.0 (2.8)	29.0 (−1.7)	49.1 (9.5)
Mean daily minimum °F (°C)	15.3 (−9.3)	17.1 (−8.3)	23.5 (−4.7)	30.1 (−1.1)	40.6 (4.8)	50.0 (10.0)	56.5 (13.6)	54.1 (12.3)	43.8 (6.6)	31.1 (−0.5)	22.1 (−5.5)	15.4 (−9.2)	33.3 (0.7)
Mean minimum °F (°C)	−13.4 (−25.2)	−9.5 (−23.1)	3.2 (−16.0)	14.2 (−9.9)	25.1 (−3.8)	36.4 (2.4)	44.1 (6.7)	40.9 (4.9)	27.1 (−2.7)	11.2 (−11.6)	−1.4 (−18.6)	−12.3 (−24.6)	−21.4 (−29.7)
Record low °F (°C)	−28 (−33)	−36 (−38)	−18 (−28)	0 (−18)	18 (−8)	28 (−2)	37 (3)	29 (−2)	20 (−7)	−16 (−27)	−16 (−27)	−40 (−40)	−40 (−40)
Average precipitation inches (mm)	0.24 (6.1)	0.53 (13)	0.80 (20)	1.71 (43)	2.93 (74)	2.19 (56)	1.78 (45)	1.36 (35)	1.39 (35)	1.13 (29)	0.46 (12)	0.42 (11)	14.94 (379.1)
Average snowfall inches (cm)	2.2 (5.6)	6.3 (16)	3.1 (7.9)	3.5 (8.9)	0.6 (1.5)	0.0 (0.0)	0.0 (0.0)	0.0 (0.0)	0.0 (0.0)	2.4 (6.1)	3.2 (8.1)	6.2 (16)	27.5 (70.1)
Average extreme snow depth inches (cm)	2.4 (6.1)	3.6 (9.1)	2.6 (6.6)	2.2 (5.6)	0.7 (1.8)	0.0 (0.0)	0.0 (0.0)	0.0 (0.0)	0.0 (0.0)	1.3 (3.3)	2.3 (5.8)	3.3 (8.4)	6.3 (16)
Average precipitation days (≥ 0.01 in)	3.5	4.6	4.9	7.3	9.8	7.7	6.8	5.7	5.5	5.5	4.0	4.2	69.5
Average snowy days (≥ 0.1 in)	1.9	2.8	1.7	1.6	0.3	0.0	0.0	0.0	0.0	1.1	1.8	2.9	14.1
Source 1: NOAA
Source 2: National Weather Service

== Demographics ==
Historical population
Census	Pop.	Note	%±
1930	245		—
1940	311		26.9%
1950	300		−3.5%
1960	233		−22.3%
1970	197		−15.5%
1980	356		80.7%
1990	243		−31.7%
2000	243		0.0%
2010	230		−5.3%
2020	206		−10.4%
U.S. Decennial Census

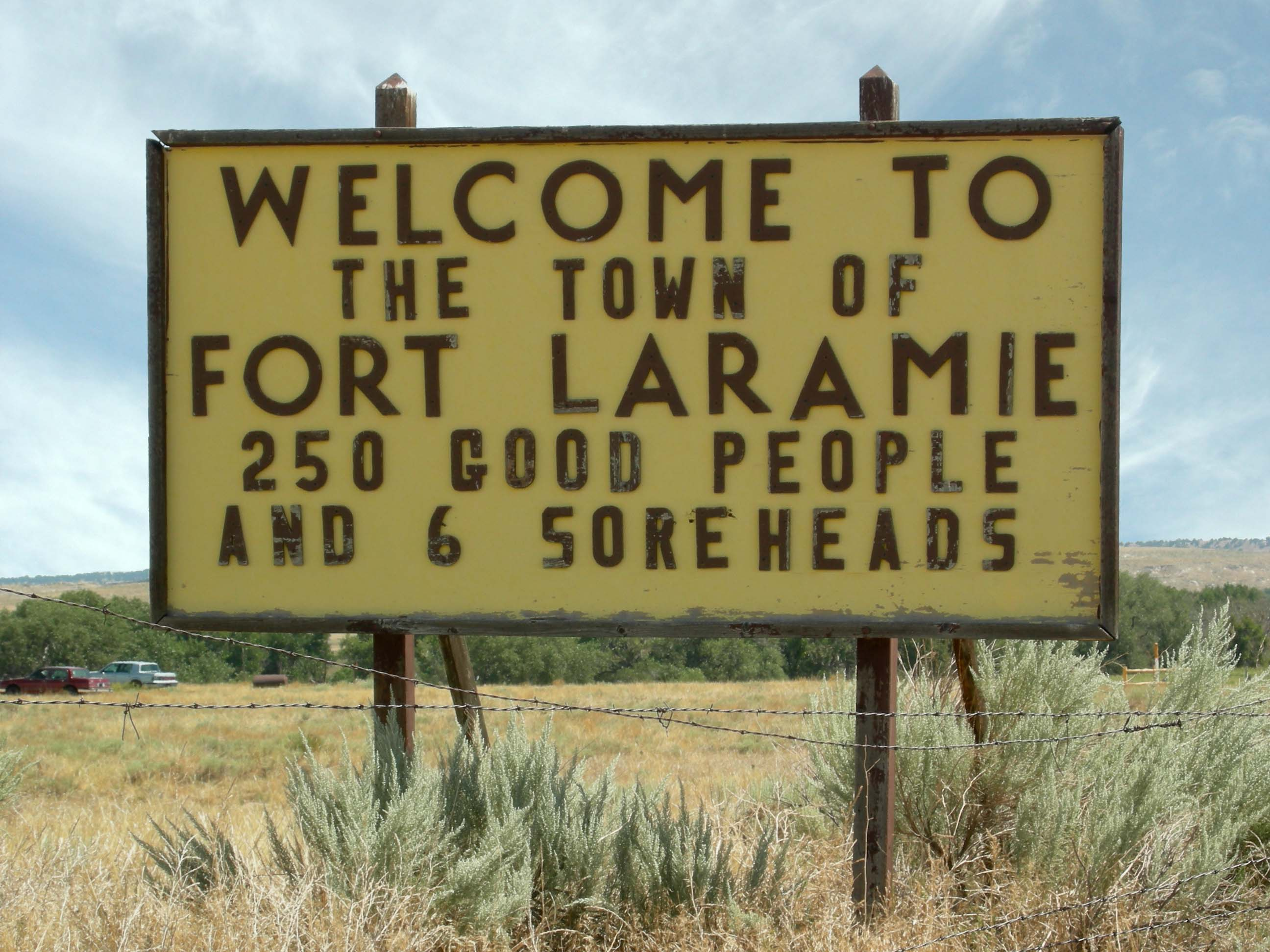
Sign in Fort Laramie

=== 2010 census ===
As of the census of 2010, there were 230 people, 111 households, and 60 families residing in the town. The population density was 851.9 inhabitants per square mile (328.9/km^{2}). There were 143 housing units at an average density of 529.6 per square mile (204.5/km^{2}). The racial makeup of the town was 91.7% White, 1.3% Native American, 3.9% from other races, and 3.0% from two or more races. Hispanic or Latino of any race were 5.7% of the population.

There were 111 households, of which 19.8% had children under the age of 18 living with them, 43.2% were married couples living together, 7.2% had a female householder with no husband present, 3.6% had a male householder with no wife present, and 45.9% were non-families. 43.2% of all households were made up of individuals, and 19.8% had someone living alone who was 65 years of age or older. The average household size was 2.07 and the average family size was 2.88.

The median age in the town was 49.5 years. 18.3% of residents were under the age of 18; 4.7% were between the ages of 18 and 24; 20% were from 25 to 44; 32.6% were from 45 to 64; and 24.3% were 65 years of age or older. The gender makeup of the town was 53.5% male and 46.5% female.

=== 2000 census ===
As of the census of 2000, there were 243 people, 119 households, and 59 families residing in the town. The population density was 916.7 people per square mile (347.5/km^{2}). There were 149 housing units at an average density of 562.1 per square mile (213.1/km^{2}). The racial makeup of the town was 94.65% White, 1.23% Native American, 2.06% from other races, and 2.06% from two or more races. Hispanic or Latino of any race were 4.53% of the population.

There were 119 households, out of which 20.2% had children under the age of 18 living with them, 39.5% were married couples living together, 6.7% had a female householder with no husband present, and 50.4% were non-families. 42.0% of all households were made up of individuals, and 21.0% had someone living alone who was 65 years of age or older. The average household size was 2.04 and the average family size was 2.86.

In the town, the population was spread out, with 21.8% under the age of 18, 4.5% from 18 to 24, 24.3% from 25 to 44, 25.9% from 45 to 64, and 23.5% who were 65 years of age or older. The median age was 45 years. For every 100 females, there were 91.3 males. For every 100 females age 18 and over, there were 84.5 males.

The median income for a household in the town was $22,500, and the median income for a family was $32,917. Males had a median income of $28,929 versus $13,125 for females. The per capita income for the town was $13,236. About 18.9% of families and 20.5% of the population were below the poverty line, including 23.3% of those under the age of eighteen and 12.5% of those 65 or over.

== Education ==
Public education for the town of Fort Laramie is provided by Goshen County School District #1.

== Highways ==
- U.S. Highway 26
- WYO 160

== Notable people ==
- Harriet Hageman (born 1962), U.S. Representative for Wyoming's at-large congressional district (2023–present)
- Innis P. Swift (1882–1953), United States Army general

== See also ==
- Fort Laramie National Historic Site
