= Sheriff (United States) =

Chief of county law enforcement

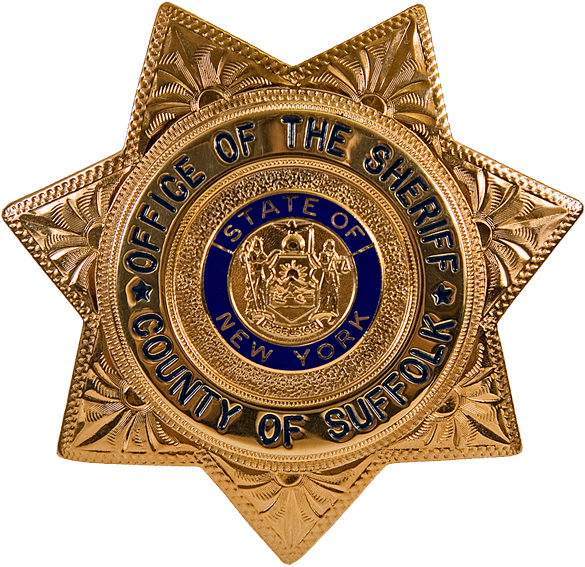
Sheriff badges are typically star-shaped, as opposed to the shield-shaped badges of most city police.

In the United States, a county sheriff, often called county police is a county's chief officer for law enforcement and peace keeping. More than 95% of sheriffs nationwide are elected by the citizens of their respective counties.

A sheriff's office is typically tasked with operating jails, security at courthouses and county buildings, protection of judges and juries, preventing breaches of the peace, and coordinating with municipal police departments. A sheriff's office may also be responsible for security at public events.

A sheriff's subordinate officers are referred to as deputies and they enforce the law in accordance with the sheriff's direction and orders.

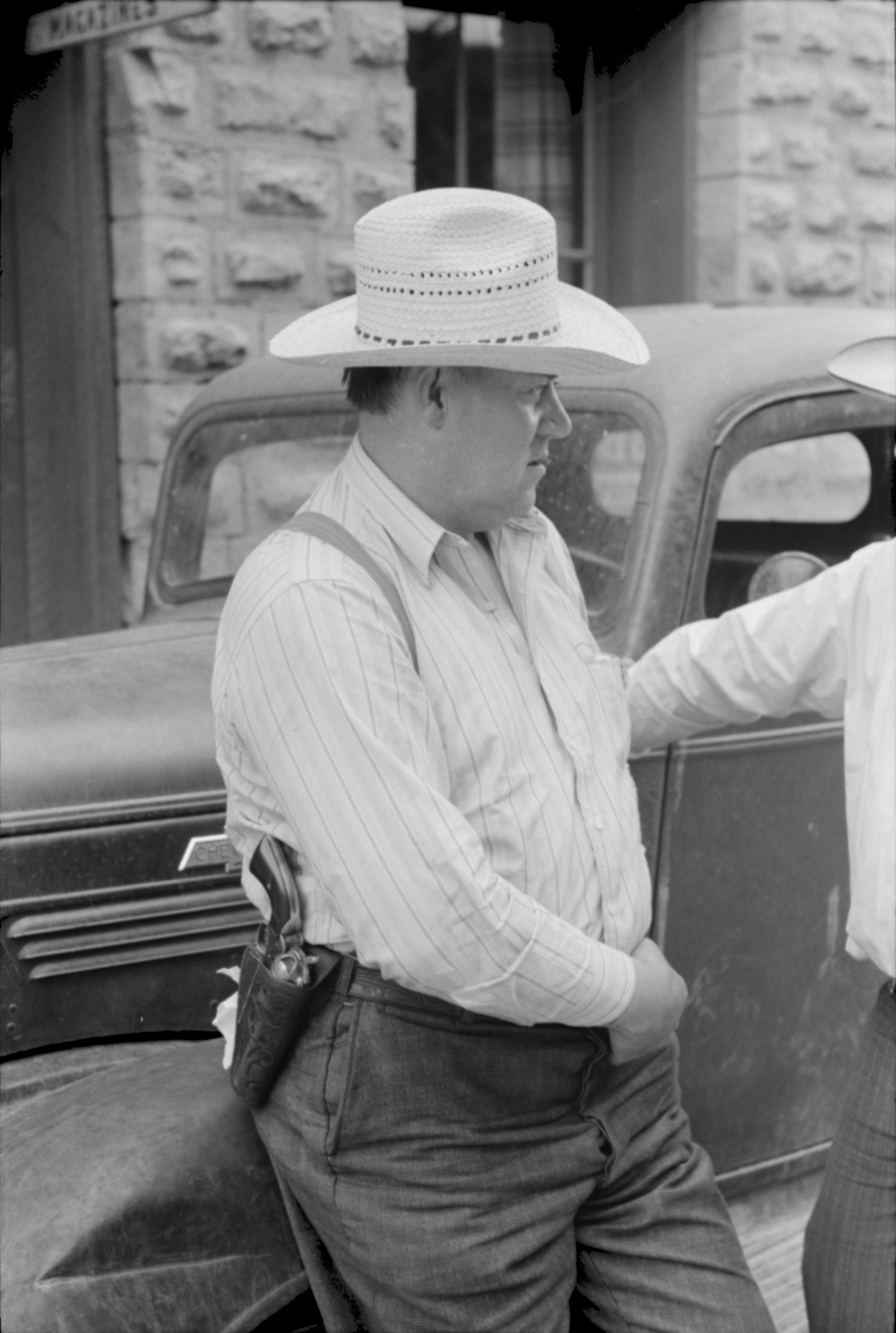
A sheriff's deputy in Mogollon, New Mexico in 1940

== Overview ==
=== Sheriff's office ===
The law enforcement agency headed by a sheriff is most commonly referred to as the "Sheriff's Office", while some are instead called the "Sheriff's Department." According to the National Sheriffs' Association, an American sheriff's advocacy group, there were 3,081 sheriff's offices as of 2015. These range in size from very small (one- or two-person) forces in sparsely populated rural areas to large, full-service law enforcement agencies, such as the Los Angeles County Sheriff's Department, which is the largest sheriff's office and the seventh largest law enforcement agency in the United States, with 16,400 members and 400 reserve deputies.

A regular officer of a sheriff's office is typically known as a deputy sheriff, sheriff's deputy or informally as a deputy. In a small sheriff's office, the deputies are supervised directly by the sheriff. Large sheriff's offices have several ranks in a similar manner to a police department. The Los Angeles County Sheriff's Department has thousands of regular deputies, who are eight ranks below the sheriff. The actual second-in-command of the sheriff typically holds the title of chief deputy or undersheriff. In some counties, the undersheriff is the warden of the county jail.

=== Election ===
Of the 50 U.S. states, 48 have sheriffs. The two exceptions are Alaska, which does not have counties, and Connecticut, which replaced its county sheriff system with the state and judicial marshals in 2000. (Note: While Connecticut abolished county-level governments in 1960, high sheriffs for each county continued to be elected to perform limited law enforcement and court business until a state constitutional amendment in 2000.) Washington, D.C., (Note: The District of Columbia was originally organized into two counties in 1801; Alexandria County was ceded back to Virginia in 1846 while Washington County was abolished in 1871.) and the five territories also do not have county governments.

Sheriffs are elected to four-year terms in 43 states, two-year terms in New Hampshire, three-year terms in New Jersey, and six-year terms in Massachusetts. Sheriffs are appointed instead of elected in Hawaii, Rhode Island and a small number of counties elsewhere.

In many rural areas of the United States, particularly in the South and West, the sheriff has traditionally been viewed as one of a given county's most influential political office-holders.

Research shows that sheriffs have a substantial incumbency advantage in elections. An incumbent sheriff has a "45 percentage point boost in the probability of winning the next election – far exceeding the advantages of other local offices." Relative to appointed police chiefs, sheriffs hold office for twice as long.

== Duties ==
The role of a sheriff's office varies considerably from state to state and even from county to county. Sheriffs and their deputies are sworn peace officers with the power to make arrests and serve before a magistrate or judge, serve warrants for arrest or order for arrest, and give a ticket/citation in order to keep the peace. Some states extend this authority to adjacent counties or to the entire state. In a small sheriff's office, the sheriff is likely to carry out law enforcement duties just like a regular deputy or police officer. In a medium-sized or large sheriff's office, this is rare and the sheriff will primarily perform leadership and management.

Many sheriff's offices also perform other functions such as traffic control, animal enforcement, accident investigations, homicide investigation, narcotics investigation, transportation of prisoners, school resource officers, search and rescue, and courthouse security. Larger departments may perform other criminal investigations or engage in other specialized law enforcement activities. Some larger sheriff's departments may have aviation (including fixed-wing aircraft or helicopters), motorcycle units, K9 units, tactical units, mounted details, or water patrols at their disposal.

In some areas of the country, such as in California's San Bernardino, Riverside, Orange, Sierra, Tulare, Ventura, and other counties, the sheriff's office also has the responsibility of a coroner's office, and is charged with recovering deceased persons within their county and conducting autopsies. The official in charge of such sheriff's departments is typically titled sheriff-coroner or sheriff/coroner, and officers who perform this function for such departments are typically titled deputy sheriff-coroner or deputy coroner.

Many sheriff's departments enlist the aid of local neighborhoods, using a community policing strategy, in working to prevent crime. The National Neighborhood Watch Program, sponsored by the National Sheriffs' Association, allows civilians and law enforcement officers to cooperate in keeping communities safe.

Sheriff's offices may coexist with other county level law enforcement agencies such as county police or county park police.

- Restricted service – provide basic court related services such as keeping the county jail, transporting prisoners, providing courthouse security and other duties with regard to service of process and summonses that are issued by county and state courts. The sheriff also often conducts public auction sales of real property in foreclosure in many jurisdictions, and is often also empowered to conduct seizures of chattel property to satisfy a judgment. In other jurisdictions, these civil process duties are performed by other officers, such as a marshal or constable.
- Limited service – along with the above, perform some type of traditional law-enforcement function such as investigations and patrol. This may be limited to security police duties on county properties (and others by contract) to the performance of these duties in unincorporated areas of the county, and some incorporated areas by contract.
- Full service – The most common type, provide all traditional law-enforcement functions, including countywide patrol and investigations irrespective of municipal boundaries.

== Federal equivalents ==
There are two federal equivalents of the sheriff;

- the United States Marshals Service, an agency of the Department of Justice. There are 94 United States Marshals, one for each federal judicial district. The U.S. Marshal and Deputy Marshals are responsible for the transport of prisoners and security for the United States district courts, and also issue and enforce certain civil processes.
- The Marshal of the United States Supreme Court who performs all court related duties for the Supreme Court of the United States.

== List of county police or sheriff's offices/departments by U.S. states ==
=== Alabama ===
In Alabama, a sheriff is an elected official and the chief law enforcement officer in any given county. There is one sheriff for each of Alabama's 67 counties, with a varying number of deputies and various staff members (usually dependent on the population). A sheriff's office generally provides law-enforcement services to unincorporated towns and cities within the boundaries of the counties.

=== Alaska ===
The office of sheriff does not exist in Alaska by the State's Constitution. Instead the functions that would in other states be performed by sheriffs and their deputies (such as civil process, court security, and prisoner transport) are performed by Alaska State Troopers and Alaska DPS Judicial Services Officers, who are the equivalent of bailiffs in other states. AJS officers wear uniforms similar to troopers and staff district court facilities statewide but not magistrate's courts. Their peace officer status is limited to courthouses and when transporting prisoners in custody. Additionally, with no county jails, Alaska Department of Corrections runs regional prisons which have separate male and female inmate "pretrial wings", which keep pretrial inmates who are legally innocent, separate from convicted prisoners who are serving a court imposed sentence following a criminal conviction. Pretrial wing units are the Alaskan equivalent of other states' county jails. This uniquely makes AK DOC officers both correctional officers and jailers. Pretrial units house persons who are formally charged with crimes and remanded to pretrial custody, vs. traditional prisons for persons convicted and sentenced to a term of incarceration.

=== Arizona ===
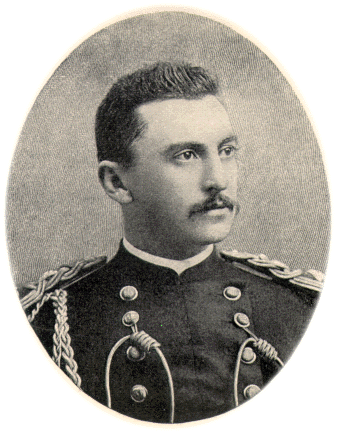
William Owen Buckey O'Neill, Yavapai Co. Arizona Sheriff 1888

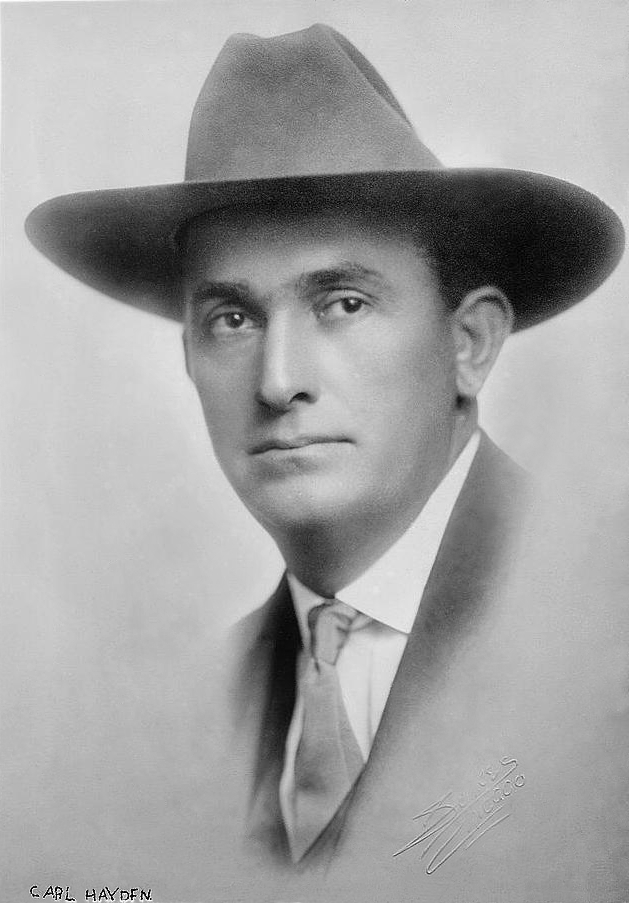
Arizona Sheriff (later U.S. Senator) Carl Hayden

In Arizona, a sheriff is the chief law enforcement officer of one of the 15 counties of the state, with a varying number of deputies and assorted staff (usually dependent on population). A constitutional officer specifically established by the Arizona Constitution, a sheriff, who heads a sheriff's office (Pima County uses the term "sheriff's department" instead), generally provides law enforcement services to unincorporated towns and cities within the boundaries of their county, maintains the county jail, and conducts all service of process for the Superior Court division for that county. In addition, many sheriff's offices have agreements with the Arizona Department of Corrections (ADC) and local police agencies to provide for the transport and detention of prisoners. After sentencing, many convicted persons are remanded over to the ADC to serve their sentence, but this has not always been the case.

Arizona is unique in that many sheriff's offices have formed semi-permanent posse units which can be operated as a reserve to the main deputized force under a variety of circumstances, as opposed to solely for fugitive retrieval as is historically associated with the term.

The Maricopa County Sheriff's Office (MCSO) is the largest sheriff's office in Arizona, with 575 sworn officers and 2,735 civilian and detention employees as of 2017. The MCSO is currently headed by Sheriff Jerry Sheridan.

=== Arkansas ===
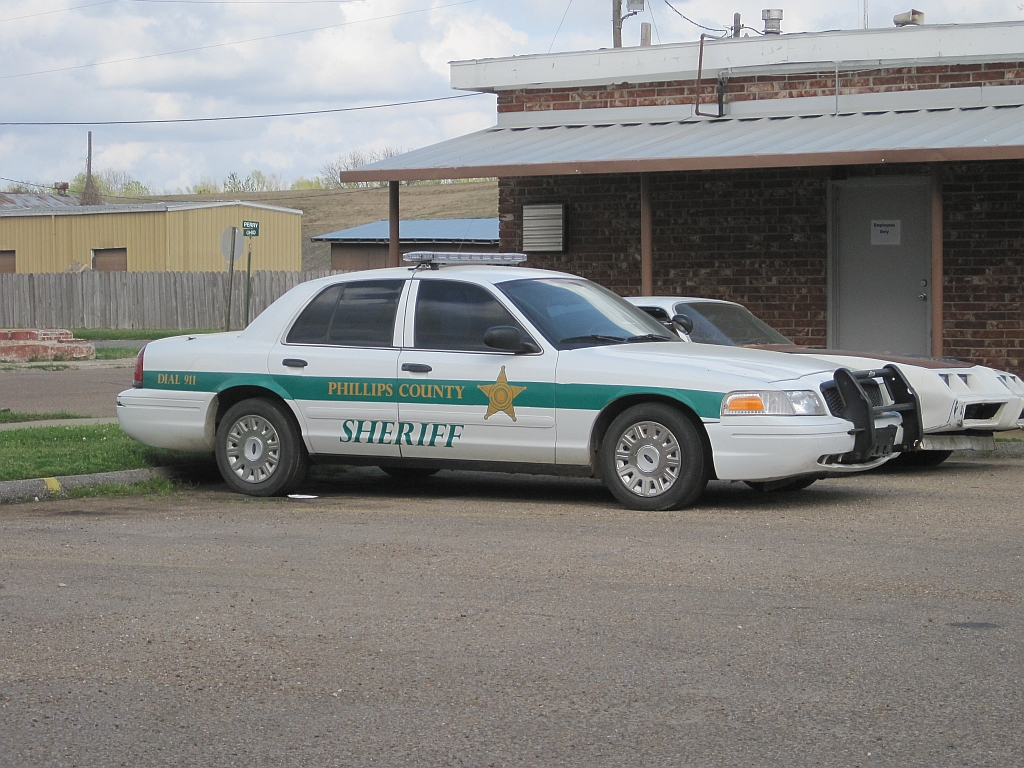
Phillips County, Arkansas, sheriff cruiser

In Arkansas, sheriffs and their deputies are fully empowered peace officers with county-wide jurisdiction and thus, may legally exercise their authority in unincorporated and incorporated areas of a county. Under state law, sheriffs and their deputies, as well as all other law enforcement and peace officers, are on-duty 24 hours a day, meaning they can make arrests with or without a warrant (provided the warrant-less arrest is a result of a violation of law committed in their presence or view).

The duties of an Arkansas sheriff generally include providing law enforcement services to residents, managing county jail(s), and providing bailiffs for the county, district, circuit, and other courts within the county. By Arkansas law, the sheriff is the chief law enforcement officer of the county. There are 75 county sheriffs in Arkansas, one for each county, regardless of its population size.

With very limited exceptions, sheriffs and their deputies may exercise their official authority only within the geographical boundaries of their specific county.

The office of sheriff was created by the state constitution and the office has not been substantially changed in 100 years.

Sheriffs in Arkansas are elected in even numbered years by citizens of their county to serve a term of four years in office in accordance with the state constitution. Sheriffs rely upon the county's legislative body, known as the "Quorum Court", to appropriate funding and approve the yearly operating budget. However, in all other circumstances, the sheriff is entirely independent in the management of his elected office and is not subservient to or accountable to any other elected county official or body.

Under Arkansas law, a sheriff cannot campaign for reelection while wearing a county-owned badge.

=== California ===
In California, a sheriff is an elected official and the chief law enforcement officer in any given county. The sheriff's department of each county polices unincorporated areas (areas of the county that do not lie within the jurisdiction of a police department of an incorporated municipality). As such, the sheriff and their deputies in rural areas and unincorporated municipalities are equivalent to police officers in the cities. The sheriff's department may also provide policing services to incorporated cities by contract (see contract city). Sheriff's departments in California are also responsible for enforcing criminal law on Native American tribal land, as prescribed by Public Law 280, which was enacted in 1953. The law transferred the responsibility of criminal law enforcement on tribal land from the federal government to state governments in specified states.

All peace officers in California are able to exercise their police powers anywhere in the state, on or off duty, regardless of county or municipal boundaries, thus California sheriffs and their deputies have full police powers in incorporated and unincorporated municipalities, outside their own counties, and on state freeways and interstates.

Before 2000, there was a constable or marshal in most (but not all) of California's 58 counties. The constable or marshal was responsible for providing bailiffs to the Municipal and Justice Courts and for serving criminal and civil process. During a reorganization of the state judicial system early in the first decade of the 21st century, the roles of constable, marshal, and sheriff were merged, so that California sheriffs assumed the duties of most marshals, and the position of constable was eliminated. The marshals offices continued to exist in only three counties—Shasta, Trinity, and San Benito—where they perform all court-security and warrant-service functions.

==== Los Angeles County ====
The Los Angeles County Sheriff's Department (LASD) serves Los Angeles County, California. With over 18,000 employees, it is the largest sheriff's department in the United States and provides general-service law enforcement to unincorporated areas of Los Angeles County, serving as the equivalent of the city police for unincorporated areas of the county as well as incorporated cities within the county who have contracted with the agency for law-enforcement services (known as "contract cities" in local jargon). It also holds primary jurisdiction over facilities operated by Los Angeles County, such as local parks, marinas and government buildings; provides marshal service for the Superior Court of California, County of Los Angeles; operates the county jail system; and provides services such as laboratories and academy training to smaller law enforcement agencies within the county.

==== San Francisco ====
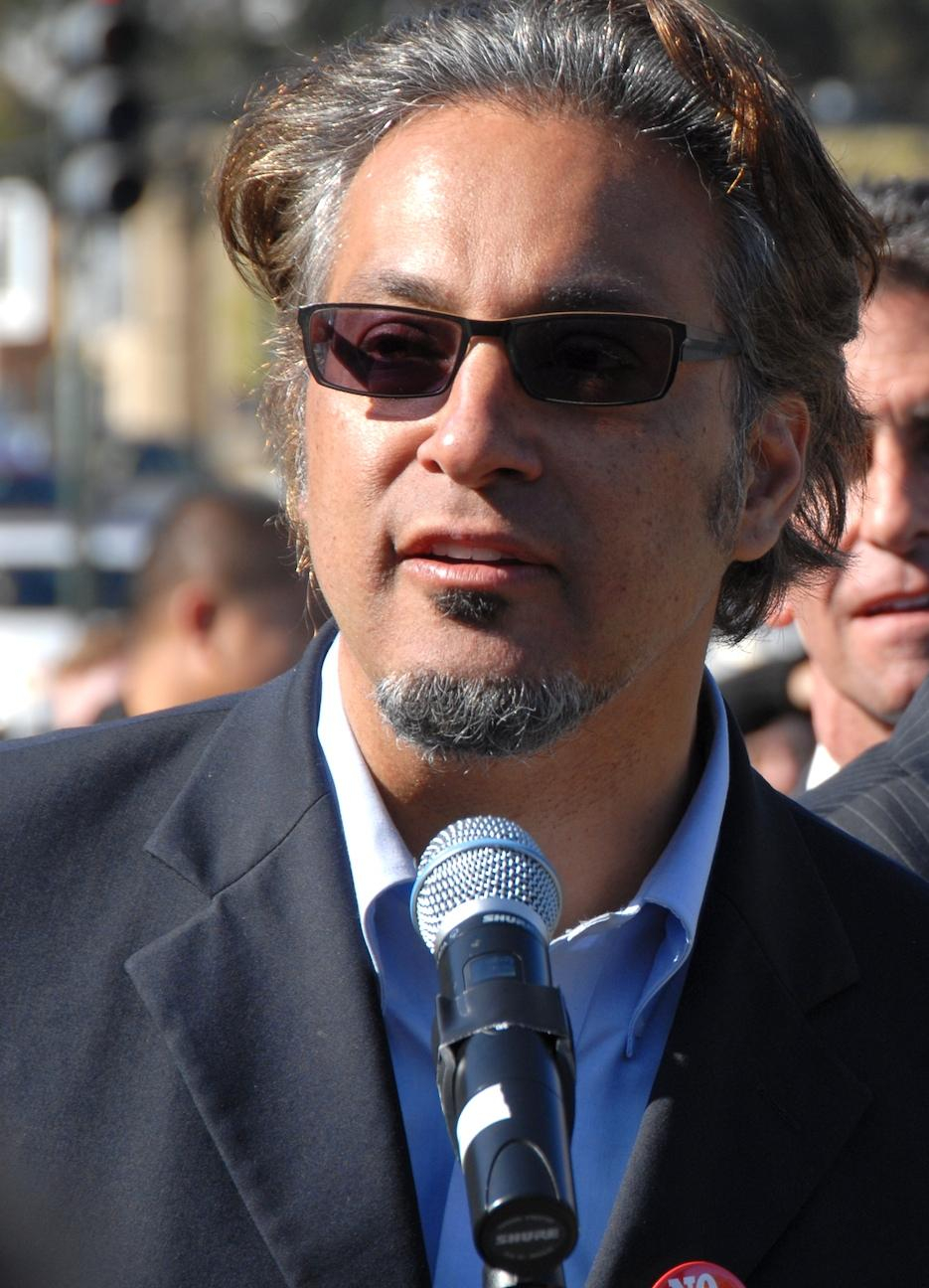
Former Sheriff Ross Mirkarimi

Because the City and County of San Francisco are consolidated and coterminous—the only consolidated city and county in California—the San Francisco Sheriff historically possessed law enforcement authority. However, as the San Francisco Police Department provides general police service for the city, the Sheriff's Department handles judicial duties, staffs the jail, and provides law enforcement services for city facilities such as San Francisco City Hall and San Francisco General Hospital. San Francisco Sheriff's deputies back up the San Francisco Police as needed, as well as make arrests for criminal and vehicle-code violations while performing their duties. Ross Mirkarimi is a former sheriff of San Francisco.

=== Colorado ===
==== Denver ====
The Denver Sheriff Department maintains the county correctional facilities as well as court functions. Law enforcement and investigations are the responsibility of the Denver Police Department. Denver's sheriff is appointed by the mayor, and serves as the sworn head of the sheriff department. Denver has had deputy sheriffs since the creation of the City & County of Denver in 1902, however the Denver Sheriff Department current organization was not established until 1969, consolidating all of the sheriff's functions under one management structure.

The Denver Sheriff is, along with Broomfield's, an anomaly within the state. In every other county, the sheriff is an elected official and is the chief law enforcement officer of their county.

==== Broomfield ====
Broomfield's sheriff is appointed, like Denver's. Unlike Denver, Broomfield's sheriff is simultaneously the chief of police, and police officers are simultaneously sheriff's deputies. The police department handles all duties normally carried out by a county sheriff's office, such as operating the county jail (detention center), civil process, and security/bailiff services for the municipal, county, and district courts and the Broomfield Combined Courts Building.

=== Connecticut ===
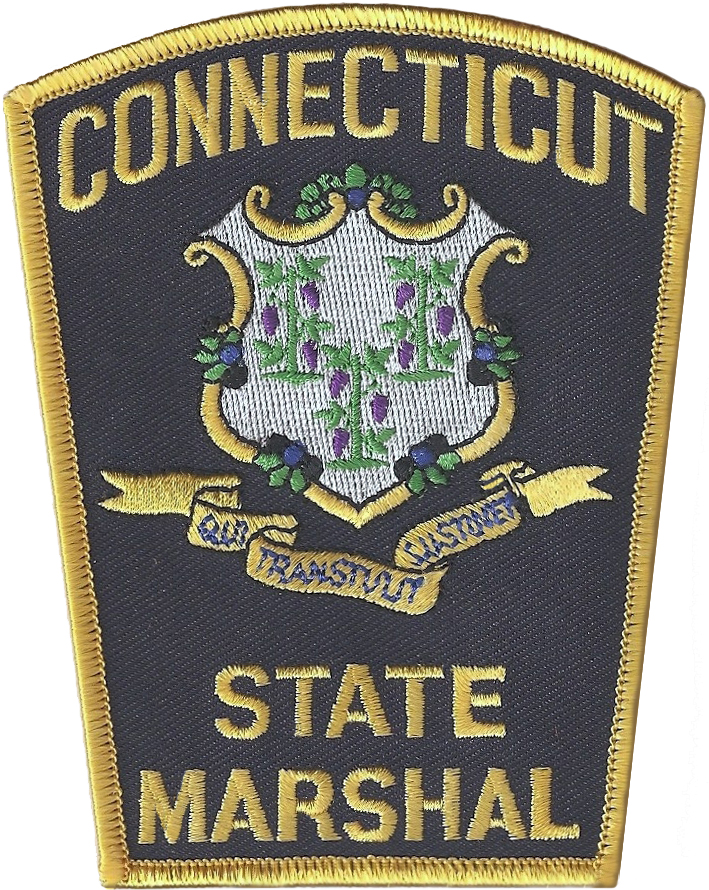
Unlike most states, Connecticut has State Marshals.

Connecticut abolished county sheriffs in 2000 by Public Act 00–01. All civil-process-serving deputies were sworn in as Connecticut State Marshals, and criminal special deputies were sworn in as Connecticut Judicial Marshal. Constables remain municipal officers governed by their respective town or city. A few towns have local sheriffs that primarily perform process serving duties and may act as a sergeant at arms for town meetings. Prior to the abolition of county sheriffs in 2000, duties of sheriffs in Connecticut were limited to process serving, court bailiffs, and executing search and arrest warrants. Other law enforcement duties, such as emergency response, highway patrol and traffic enforcement, and maintaining public order were left to municipal police departments or constables or the Connecticut State Police in places where no local police agency exists.

=== Delaware ===
The first Constitution of Delaware in 1776 made the sheriff a conservator of the peace within the county in which he resides, either New Castle, Kent, or Sussex. The sheriff was, and still is, chosen by the citizens of each county at the general elections to serve a four-year term. Per Title 10, Chapter 21 of the Delaware Code, the sheriff is an officer of the court. Responsibilities include processing orders of the court system; summoning inquests, jurors, and witnesses for the courts; and, conducting execution sales against personal and real estate property. County Sheriffs and their regular appointed deputies also take into custody unincarcerated persons immediately upon conviction of an imprisonable offense and convey them to the appropriate correctional facility to serve their terms. The County Sheriffs and their deputies do not engage in typical law enforcement; their primary role is to provide enforcement services for the courts. Typical law enforcement, such as the enforcement of motor vehicle laws, investigation of crimes and routine policing patrols are performed by state, county, and municipal (town or city) police forces.

"Delaware sheriffs since 1897 have not had arrest powers and instead act as ministerial officers serving subpoenas and other papers for the courts."

Delaware county sheriffs' limitation of powers has been a subject of controversy over the years.

=== District of Columbia ===
There is no appointed or elected sheriff in the District of Columbia because, as a federal district, it is in a unique and complicated position compared to other jurisdictions in the United States. As the District Government is both an agency of the federal government and a duly elected Local Government under the D.C. Home Rule Act of 1973, there are many functions which would normally be reserved for the Office of the Sheriff, which are instead delegated to various other agencies. The United States Marshal Service, as an agent of the federal government officially handles most court and civil processes in the District of Columbia, while the District of Columbia Protective Services Police Department (PSPD) handles many other functions normally reserved for the Office of the Sheriff on behalf of the elected local government.

=== Florida ===
Florida sheriffs are one of a handful of "constitutional" Florida offices; that is, the position was established as part of the Florida State constitution, which specifies their powers and that they be elected in the general ballot. They serve as the chief law enforcement officer in their respective counties. The sheriff's office is responsible for law enforcement, corrections, and court services within the county. Although each county sheriff's office is an independent agency, they all wear the "Florida's sheriff green" uniform with similar badges and patches, and drive vehicles with green and gold designs, as prescribed in Florida State Statutes, with the exception of Duval and Miami-Dade. Collier County also does not wear green; they wear a grey uniform with green accents.

==== St. Lucie County ====
The St. Lucie Sheriff's Office is currently under the direction of Sheriff John Saintima. In November 2024, the St. Lucie County Sheriff's Office Deputies Association—a 1,400-member branch of the International Union of Police Associations—announced a vote of a vote for Saintima. In December 2024, the Florida State Commissioners wrote governor DeSantis to formally request that Keith Pearson be removed.

==== Miami-Dade County ====
As of 2025, Miami-Dade County (formerly Dade County) has an elected sheriff, Rosie Cordero-Stutz, and an appointed Corrections Director. The Corrections Director is appointed by the county commission and is separate from the Miami-Dade Sheriff's Office at this time.

- The elected Sheriff is in charge of the Miami-Dade Sheriff's Office (formerly the Miami-Dade Police Department and is separate from the City of Miami Police Department).
- The director serves in command of corrections (of the Miami-Dade Department of Corrections) and is charged with the care and custody of prisoners and is separated from Miami-Dade Sheriff's Office.

==== Duval County ====
Upon the consolidation of Duval County and the City of Jacksonville governments in 1968, the Duval County Sheriff's Department and the Jacksonville Police Department were merged into a single unified law enforcement agency styled the Jacksonville Sheriff's Office (JSO). Commanded by the elected Sheriff of Duval County, and an appointed senior staff, its 1675 sworn members are referred to as "police officers" rather than deputies. All JSO police officers are also deputy sheriffs, in order to perform those duties Florida solely permits "sheriffs and their deputies" to perform, such as serving warrants. Similarly, the 800 members of the JSO's Department of Corrections are "Correctional Officers". T. K. Waters is the current sheriff.

JSO police and corrections uniforms are dark navy blue, with silver devices for police and corrections officers and gold for supervisory and command personnel. Marked JSO vehicles are white with a broad gold stripe on each side with the word "SHERIFF" displayed in navy blue on each rear quarter-panel and "POLICE" in navy blue on the rear of the vehicle. In 2007, in terms of sworn officers, JSO was the 25th largest local police agency in the US, and the second largest in the state of Florida.

==== Broward County ====
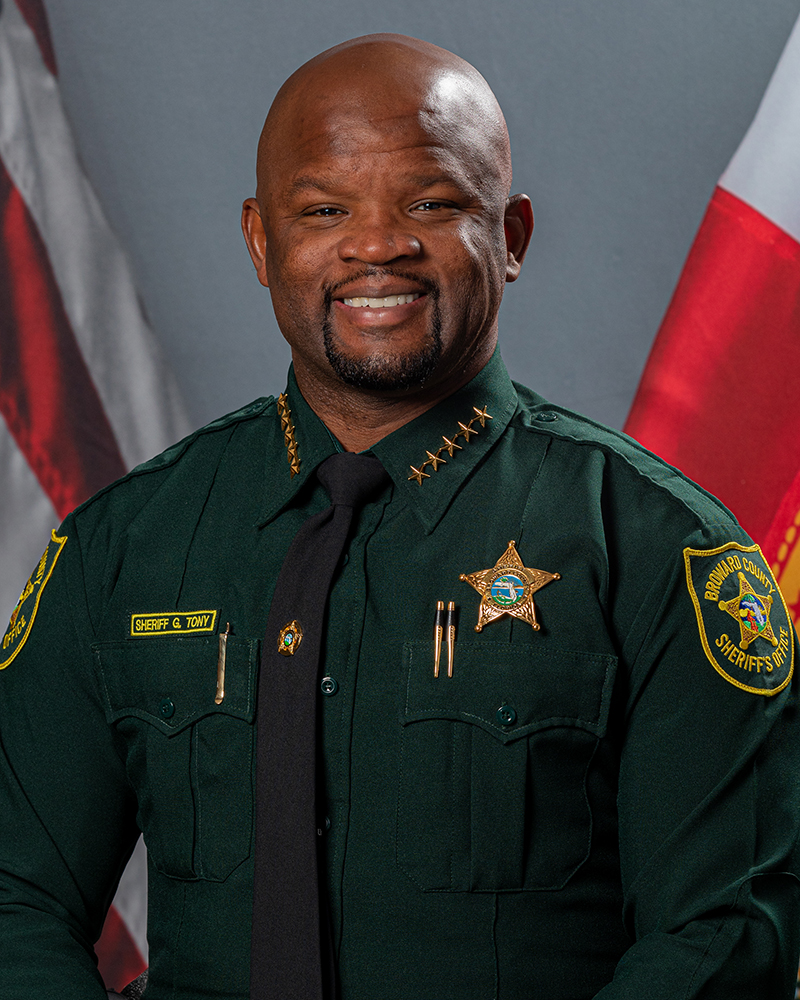
Gregory Tony is the current Sheriff of Broward County and began serving in 2019.

The Broward Sheriff's Office is currently under the direction of Sheriff Gregory Tony. In April 2020 and 2024, the Broward Sheriff's Office Deputies Association—a 1,400-member branch of the International Union of Police Associations—announced a vote for Tony.

The sheriff has an undersheriff and several district chiefs, also called district commanders. These individuals generally hold the title of "captain." It is a full-service law enforcement agency. The Broward Sheriff's Office (BSO) also directs and oversees the fire/rescue/EMS operations for the county, referred to Broward County Fire Rescue (BSO or County Fire Rescue). Overseeing the operation of the Fire/Rescue/EMS Division is a fire chief and several deputy chiefs. BSO Fire Rescue serves unincorporated parts of the county as well as municipalities under contract for fire/rescue/EMS. BSO also operates several helicopters that serve a dual purpose. Each helicopter is suited for law enforcement duties as well as medical evacuation (MEDEVAC); the helicopters are staffed both by sworn deputies as well as a flight nurse or flight medic. BSO also has a professional Marine Patrol, motor (cycle) patrol and mounted (horse) patrol. The Broward Sheriff's office also contracts its law enforcement duties to municipalities that either have no local police department or have disbanded the local police department to be incorporated to BSO.

==== Orange County ====
The Orange County Sheriff's Office is the chief law enforcement agency for Orange County, Florida. The office is large, with a budget of more than $300 million and over 2,700 sworn and civilian employees. The current sheriff, John Mina, was elected in a 2018 special election, and is the chief law enforcement officer of Orange County responsible for the safety of over one million residents and the more than 72 million tourists that visit Orange County each year.

=== Georgia ===
Sheriffs and their deputies and any other state certified peace officer may make an arrest on or off duty only after stating that they are peace officers in the state of Georgia. One of five county officials listed in the state constitution, sheriffs in Georgia are full-service county officers. Article IX, Section I of the constitution specifies that sheriffs "shall be elected by the qualified voters of their respective counties for a term of four years and shall have such qualifications, powers and duties as provided by general law." However, several metropolitan counties have opted to form a county police to perform law enforcement functions leaving the sheriff to court functions. Others also have a county marshal who provide civil law enforcement. Even with other agencies in the same county, such as county police, the sheriff is the chief law enforcement officer of each county. All law enforcement officers in Georgia have statewide jurisdiction if the crime happens in their immediate presence, but sheriffs have statewide jurisdiction also if the crime originated in their county. This means if someone breaks the law in one county and flees to another the sheriff can go anywhere inside the state to investigate the crime, make the arrest, and transport the accused back to the original county.

Most of the qualifications, powers and duties of a sheriff in Georgia are detailed in Title 15, Chapter 16 of state law. Among other things, the law states that "the sheriff is the basic law enforcement officer of the several counties of this state." Section 10 makes it clear that the sheriff has as much authority within municipalities as he does in unincorporated areas of his county, although many sheriffs refrain from performing standard law-enforcement functions within municipalities that have their own police department unless specifically requested to do so, or are required to do so in order to fulfill other provisions in state law.

In addition to law enforcement, sheriffs or their deputies execute and return all processes and orders of the courts; receive, transport, and maintain custody of incarcerated individuals for court; attend the place or places of holding elections; keep all courthouses, jails, public grounds, and other county property; maintain a register of all precious-metal dealers; enforce the collection of taxes that may be due to the state; as well as numerous other duties.

The office of sheriff in Georgia existed in colonial times, and was included in the first official constitution of Georgia in 1777. There is no limit to how many terms a sheriff may serve. Title 15, Chapter 16, Section 40 of Georgia law specifies that, upon reaching 75 years of age, a sheriff who has held that office for 45 or more years automatically holds the honorary office of sheriff emeritus of the State of Georgia.

In metropolitan counties the sheriff's responsibilities have changed from that of being the sole law enforcement official for their counties, to performing only traditional court-related functions but with wide-ranging duties in coordination with a county police department in the suburbs of the state capital and major cities. When these county police departments were formed they assumed patrol, investigative, crime fighting, and transportation safety responsibilities.

There are two Georgia counties where the police department in the county seat and the local sheriff's office have merged most of their general operations: the Macon-Bibb County Sheriffs Office and the Augusta-Richmond County Sheriff's Office.

=== Hawaii ===
Hawaii has two sheriffs, with very different functions and jurisdictions:

- The Office of Sheriff falls under the Sheriff's Division of the Hawaii Department of Law Enforcement. It is the functional equivalent of a state police department and has the distinction of making Hawaii the only U.S. state without an officially named state police department and one of two with a statewide Sheriff's Department (the other being Rhode Island). Although the Sheriff Division's jurisdiction covers the entire state, its primary functions are judicial and executive protection, security at the Hawaii State Capitol, law enforcement at Hawaii's airports, narcotics enforcement, prisoner transportation, the processing and service of court orders and warrants, and the patrol of certain roads and waterways in conjunction with other state agencies.
- The sheriff of Kalawao County, Hawaii, located on the Kalaupapa Peninsula on the north coast of the island of Moloka'i and the smallest US county, is selected from among the 86 local residents (86 total population per the 2019 estimate of the US Census Bureau), by the Hawaii Department of Health, which administers the county. The sheriff is the sole county government employee.

=== Idaho ===
The state of Idaho consists of 44 counties. Each county in Idaho has an elected position for the Office of Sheriff which is the supreme law enforcement of a county. The Office of Sheriff is elected in 4-year terms.

=== Illinois ===
In Illinois, the sheriff is the highest law enforcement authority in each county; however, incorporated municipalities, regardless of their sizes, are responsible for primary law enforcement within their jurisdiction. Therefore, the sheriffs' offices generally concentrate their police functions on unincorporated areas. In addition, many small municipalities pay the sheriff's office a portion of their law enforcement funds for the sheriff to act as their primary law enforcement: usually either overnight, which allows the local police department to operate with local officers during the day; or full-time, relieving the village of needing its own police department.

In addition to providing policing, the sheriff's office controls the county jail, guards the courthouse, acts as the process server for court documents such as summonses, and oversees evictions, even inside municipalities with their own police forces.

==== Cook County ====
The Cook County Sheriff's Office is the second largest in the United States, with over 6,900 members. Due to its size, the Cook County Sheriff's Office divides its operations by task into 8 departments, the most recognizable of which is the Cook County Sheriff's Court Services Department. The much smaller Cook County Sheriff 's Police Department provides traditional police services in Unincorporated Cook County while the Department of Corrections operates the Cook County Department of Corrections.

All Cook County Sheriff's deputies are sworn and state-certified peace officers with police powers regardless of their particular job function or title. Like other sheriffs' departments in Illinois, the sheriff can provide all traditional law-enforcement functions, including county-wide patrol and investigations irrespective of municipal boundaries, even in the city of Chicago, but has traditionally limited its police patrol functions to unincorporated areas of the county because unincorporated areas are the primary jurisdiction of a Sheriff's Department in Illinois.

The Sheriff's Police patrol services are often not required in incorporated cities because the cities such as Chicago have established their own police departments. The 500–600-member sheriff's police department would not have the personnel necessary to supply full police services to all incorporated areas in Cook County especially in a municipality such as Chicago.

Sheriff's deputies, outside the Sheriff's Police, provide the other services of the sheriff, such as guarding the various courthouses in Cook County, running and guarding the 9,800-detainee Cook County Jail, and overseeing other offender rehabilitation programs.

=== Indiana ===
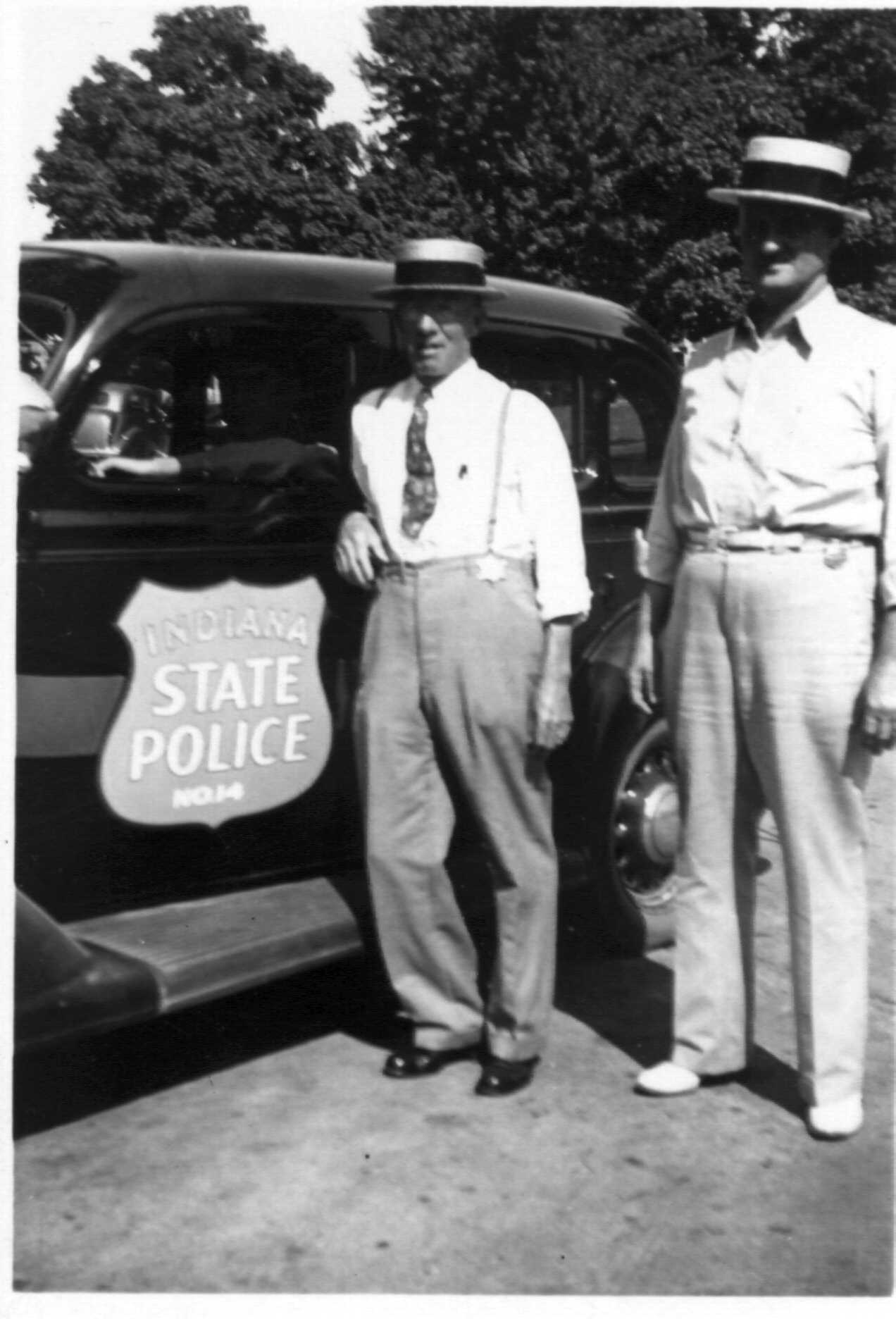
Greene County, Indiana Sheriff and Deputy Sheriff with the Indiana State Police circa 1940

In Indiana, county sheriffs are elected to office and limited by the state constitution to serving no more than two four-year terms consecutively. Indiana sheriffs are empowered to make the arrest of persons who commit an offense within the sheriff's view, and take them before a court of the county having jurisdiction, and detain them in custody until the cause of the arrest has been investigated. They possess a general power to suppress breaches of the peace, calling the power of the county to the sheriff's aid if necessary; pursue and jail felons; serve and execute judicial process; attend and preserve order in all courts of the county; take care of the county jail and the prisoners there; take photographs, fingerprints, and other identification data as the sheriff shall prescribe of persons taken into custody for felonies or misdemeanors. They are required to provide an accounting to the state department of correction concerning the costs of incarcerating prisoners in the county.

Somewhat unusual among the states, Indiana sheriffs are paid a salary out of which they must feed the prisoners in the county jails in their charge. They must account for the money they spend on prisoner's food; many counties' agreement with the sheriff's department allows the elected sheriff to keep the remaining funds allocated, which is contrary to state law. As a result, in many Indiana counties, the position of sheriff is one of the more lucrative of the elected officials, and the elections for sheriff are frequently hotly contested and draw larger numbers of candidates than most other county elective positions.

Indiana Sheriffs may also appoint Special Deputies to act as private security police for businesses. These Special Deputies are only empowered during the course of their employment hours and do not have any police authority when not actively working. Special Deputies appointed who work for the Sheriff's Department or other municipal or governmental agencies are limited only by any written limitations and specific requirements imposed by the sheriff and signed by the Special Deputy

Additionally, the Indiana Supreme Court appoints a sheriff to maintain the safety of the judiciary and court facilities. The Supreme Court Sheriff also serves the papers and orders of the court.

The Elkhart County Sheriff's Office was the first sheriff's office in the nation to receive accreditation through CALEA. (Commission on Accreditation for Law Enforcement Agencies)

Under an agreement between Indianapolis Mayor Bart Peterson and Marion County Sheriff Frank J. Anderson, the sheriff was responsible for overseeing the Indianapolis Metropolitan Police Department following the department's creation in January, 2007, until the agreement was rescinded by Peterson's successor as mayor, Greg Ballard effective on February 29, 2008.

=== Iowa ===
There are 99 Sheriffs in the State of Iowa; one for each county. Sheriffs are elected to four-year terms in office with no term limits.

Sheriff's Offices within Iowa have many functions: Patrol – which is the most visible and provides public safety activities and traffic enforcement duties; Jail – according to Iowa law, the sheriff is responsible for the operation of the county jail. This responsibility includes the transportation of prisoners, the guarding of jail facilities, and in some counties, the securing of the county courthouse; Civil – according to Iowa law, the sheriff is responsible for the civil process, which includes serving legal documents from the court and conducting evictions, sales and other civil related duties; and Detective – which investigates crimes and conducts follow up activities on cases.

Although a primary responsibility of the Sheriff's Office is to provide law enforcement protection to the unincorporated and rural areas of the county, most Sheriff's Offices contract to provide law enforcement services to smaller incorporated communities that do not have their own police department.

A sheriff must be a certified peace officer through the Iowa Law Enforcement Academy as required under the Code of Iowa chapter 80B or must complete the basic training course within one year of taking office. Iowa deputy sheriffs are covered by civil service law which ensures that after their probationary periods they are only removed from office for just cause. Deputy Sheriffs must complete the state law enforcement academy within their first year of employment.

In accordance with state law, the Iowa State Sheriffs' and Deputies' Association establishes the uniform and vehicle standards for all 99 counties. As such, all uniforms and patrol vehicle graphics are the same for each of the 99 Sheriff's Offices throughout Iowa with the exception of the respective County's name appearing on their badges, uniform patches, and vehicle markings. Badge numbers for sheriffs and deputies consist of a prefix number, which represents the county number, followed by a one- to three-digit number, which represents the sheriff's or deputy's number within that specific office. The sheriff's badge number in each county is always #1. So the sheriff from Bremer County would have an ID number of 9-1 (9 is the county number for Bremer County and 1 is the number for the sheriff).

=== Kansas ===
Sheriffs are elected officials in their counties. They serve four-year terms between elections. There are 105 counties in Kansas but only 104 sheriffs. In the 1970s, Riley County merged the police departments within the county and created the Riley County Police Department. The RCPD is head by a director who is hired by a police board. In Riley county, any duties that a county sheriff would perform are carried out by the RCPD. A small number of sheriffs in Kansas contract their police services to cities within their county boundaries that do not wish to manage their own police departments.

=== Kentucky ===
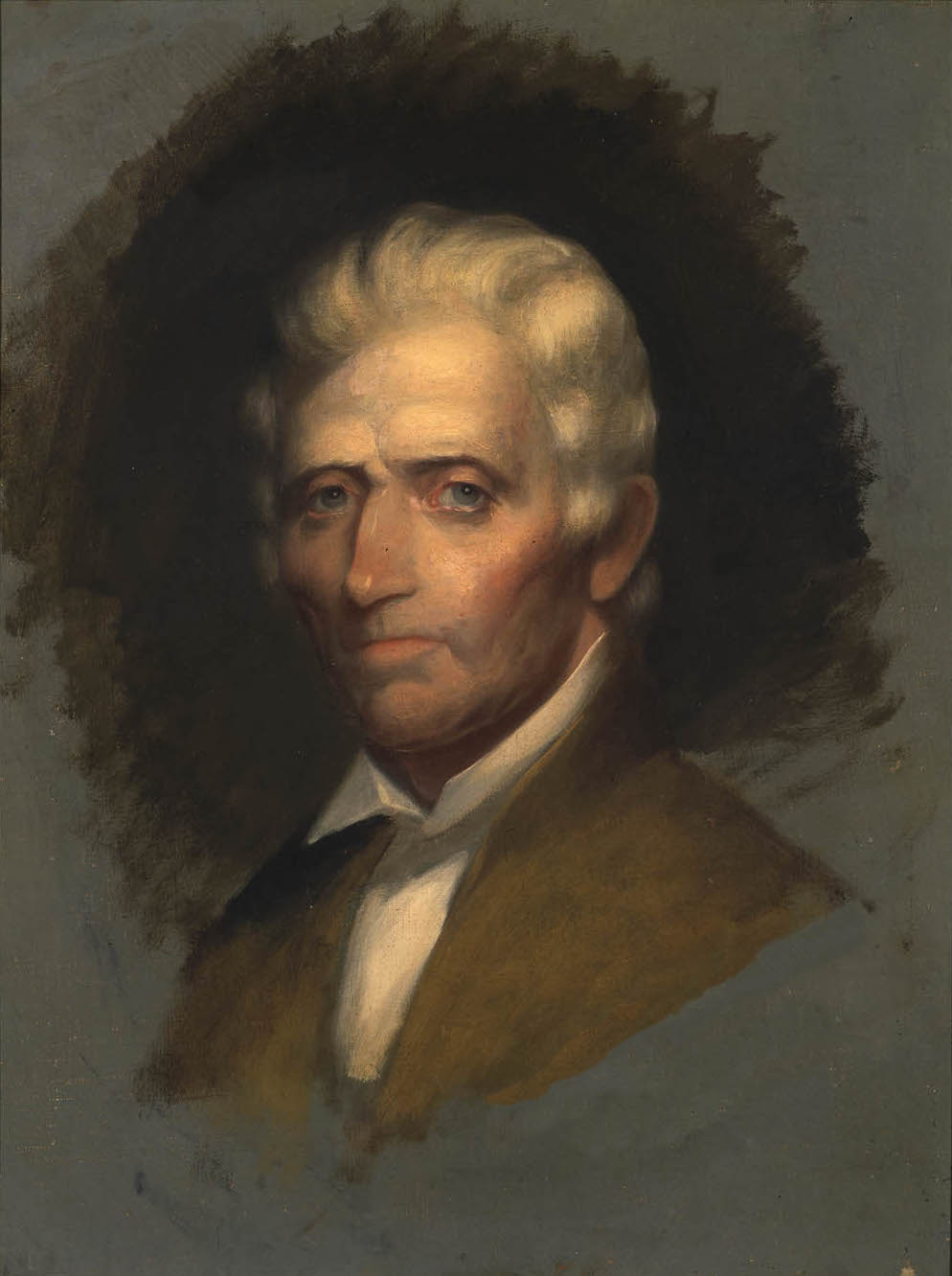
Daniel Boone 1782 Sheriff of Fayette County, KY

Sheriffs in Kentucky are elected for four-year terms and are not term limited. Sheriffs and deputies in Kentucky have the authority to patrol as well as power of arrest in all areas of their particular county, including incorporated cities. Most sheriffs, however, choose to patrol incorporated cities either only on the request of city officials or in the case of a major emergency. Sheriff's deputies will jointly patrol unincorporated areas of their county with the Kentucky State Police. In addition, sheriffs in Kentucky are responsible for court security, serving court papers, and transporting prisoners. Kentucky sheriffs offices are also responsible for collecting conceled carry permit applications and fees, submitting these applications and fees to the Kentucky State Police for approval and distributing concealed carry licenses once they are approved and issued by the Kentucky State Police. Sheriffs are also responsible for collecting taxes on real estate and tangible property. Also, Kentucky law states that only the county coroner, also an elected peace officer, can serve the sitting sheriff with a state criminal court process or place him/her under arrest (any peace officer, however, can arrest the coroner).

One of the main differences between Kentucky sheriffs and sheriffs in other states is that in most counties in Kentucky sheriffs do not run the county jails. County jails are run by a separate elected official called a jailer who has the authority to employ deputy jailers. The sheriff's office, however, may be asked by the jailer to assist with jail security in the event of an emergency. The only exception is in counties containing first class cities or counties with consolidated city/county governments which may merge their offices of sheriff and jailer and retain the office of sheriff to fill both roles. In these cases the sheriff can then relinquish responsibility for the jail back to the county or consolidated government to operate. This is the case in both Jefferson County and Fayette County, which are both the only counties with first class cities (Louisville & Lexington respectively) and are the only counties with merged city/county governments.

Deputy sheriffs, like municipal police officers, must be trained and certified as peace officers through the Kentucky Justice and Public Safety Cabinet Law Enforcement Training Center at Eastern Kentucky University in Richmond, unless they have previously completed another recognized police academy. To maintain certification, all certified peace officers must complete forty hours of in-service training annually. Sheriffs themselves, however, are not mandated to be trained and certified as the job requirements for sheriff are described in the Kentucky Constitution, rather than the Kentucky Revised Statutes. Many sheriffs, however, do choose to receive this training if they had not received it as a law enforcement officer prior to their election.

=== Louisiana ===
The Louisiana constitution establishes the office of sheriff in each parish, each elected to a term of four years (Const. Art. V, §27). The sheriff is the chief law enforcement officer in the parish and has both criminal and civil jurisdiction. The sheriff is in charge of all criminal investigations and is responsible for executing court orders and process. The sheriff is the collector of ad valorem taxes and other taxes and license fees as provided by law and is the keeper of the public jail in the parish. Article V, Section 32 provides for the offices of civil sheriff and criminal sheriff in Orleans Parish. State & Local Government in Louisiana, Chapter 3 Local Government, Part. II. Constitutional Offices. The office is so powerful that Harry Lee—elected seven times as sheriff of Jefferson Parish, and head of a powerful southern Louisiana political machine—said, "Why would I want to be governor when I can be king?"

==== Orleans Parish ====
Orleans Parish now has one sheriff with the new Orleans Parish Sheriff's Office combining the following two offices into one office in accordance with Louisiana Revised Statute 33:1500,. This statute required the Orleans Parish criminal and civil sheriffs' offices to be merged into one office by 2010 as a result of legislation passed to merge the Criminal and Civil Courts into one consolidated district court, as in all other Louisiana parishes.

- The Criminal Sheriff, operates Orleans Parish Prison; and performs security, serves process, and performs enforcement functions for the Criminal District Court. Deputies are state-commissioned peace officers and are empowered to enforce all the laws of the state and ordinances of the parish. In addition, the Criminal Sheriff operates a Search & Rescue unit for maritime operations, as part of the Special Operations Division.
- The Civil Sheriff, under Louisiana Revised Statute 13:1311, "...and the constables of the First and Second City Courts of New Orleans and their deputies, are hereby granted the powers of peace officers when carrying out the duties of the court, and are authorized to require incarceration of the subject involved in any of the city, parish or state prisons, precinct stations, or houses of detention in the parish of Orleans. They shall be exempt from liability for their actions in the exercise of this power in the same manner and fashion as liability is excluded generally for peace officers of this state and political subdivisions."

=== Maine ===
Maine's sixteen counties elect one sheriff every four years in a partisan election. Each sheriff is the chief executive law enforcement officer for their county.

The duties of the office of the sheriff are corrections, service of process and Patrol. The sheriff operates the county jails and transports prisoners. The Sheriffs Office provides police patrol, responds to calls for assistance and provides investigative services to towns not large enough to maintain their own police departments. Some towns may contract with a Sheriff's Department for additional or more intensive coverage than would normally be allocated. The Sheriff's Department and Maine State Police share patrol and investigative duties in towns without police departments. The sheriff and their deputies have full police powers within their respective counties. In Maine there are only 2 ranks, deputy and the sheriff.

=== Maryland ===
In Maryland, per the State Constitution, each county shall have an elected sheriff that serves a term of four years with all deputy sheriffs required to be sworn law enforcement officials with full arrest authority by the state's governing agency, the Maryland Police and Correctional Training Commission. In the 18 more sparsely populated counties, the County Sheriff is the primary law enforcement agency charged with investigating crimes, enforcing traffic laws, enforcing orders of the court, and transporting, housing, and controlling the county jail inmate population.

In Anne Arundel County, Baltimore County, Baltimore City, Howard County, and Montgomery County the Sheriff's Office still retains its law enforcement authority in all areas; however, their duties are strictly limited to enforcing orders of the court except in rare instances where called upon by the County Police or other law enforcement to assist. In Prince George's County, the Sheriff's Office and the County Police share the responsibility of county law enforcement. The Prince George's County Police still enforce the vast majority of crimes and traffic laws. Along with the traditional duties of enforcing all orders of the court, the Prince George's County Sheriff's Office responds to all domestic calls for service within the county's District III, is a part of the Homeland Security Task Force, US Marshal Taskforce, and the FBI Task Force. Within Maryland, the size of each county's Sheriff's Office varies greatly from forces of approximately 30 sworn to well over 500 in the more populated counties.

=== Massachusetts ===
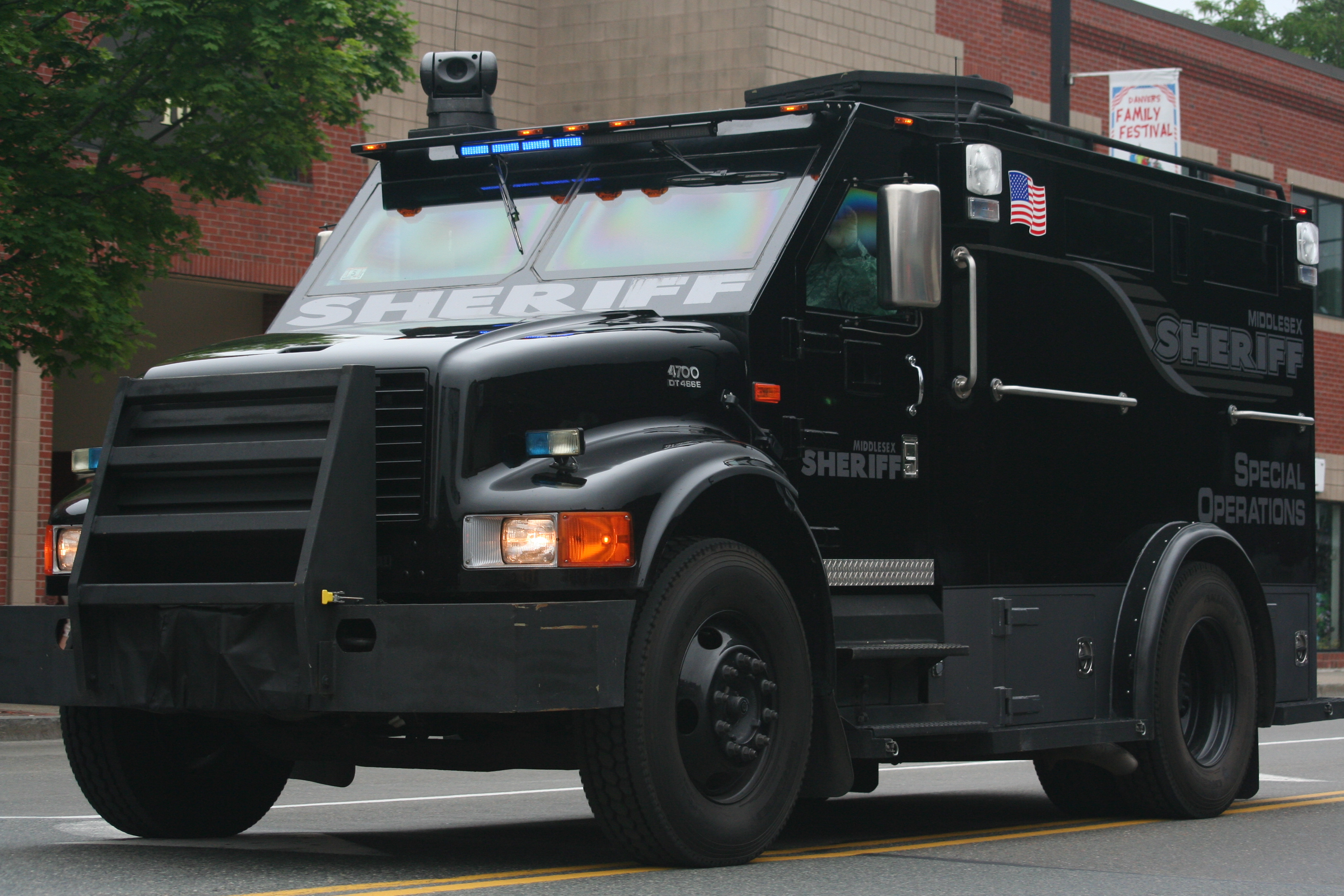
A special operations truck of the sheriff's office of Middlesex County, Massachusetts

There are 14 counties in Massachusetts, each with a sheriff who is elected to a six-year term. The state abolished eight of its 14 county governments between 1997 and 2000; those eight now exist only as geographic regions, with their elected sheriffs considered employees of the commonwealth.

The duties of the office of the sheriff in Massachusetts are primarily to maintain custody of a county jail and house of correction, to serve civil process, and to transport inmates to and from courts and other facilities. Although they have police powers, their duties are to generally support local law enforcement, and they do not usually patrol. The sheriffs in Massachusetts are considered to be the chief law enforcement officers in their counties. In some counties, such as Plymouth, Norfolk, Hampden, and Barnstable, the sheriffs maintain law enforcement services such as K-9, criminal investigation, and tactical response, gang enforcement, and warrant teams. Deputies are often seen supporting local police in traffic control and at large events like county fairs and sports events.

A 2020 investigation by WBUR into prison deaths found incidents of poor medical care (representing about one-third of deaths where details were available), neglect, and assault by corrections officers, had few consequences for elected sheriffs, nurses, or corrections officers. Sheriffs have denied family members, reporters, and even the Suffolk County District attorney information about deaths, including the circumstances surrounding the deaths, names of inmates, disciplinary records, and in some counties even the number of deaths was kept secret. The actual number of deaths was about 25% higher than the number reported to the federal Department of Justice. Many out-of-court settlements of wrongful death lawsuits were kept secret, and some were not properly reported to the state treasurer.

See also:

- Middlesex County Sheriff's Office
- Suffolk County Sheriff's Department
- Hampden County Sheriff's Office
- List of Sheriffs of Essex County, Massachusetts
- List of Sheriffs of Norfolk County, Massachusetts
- List of Sheriffs of Worcester County, Massachusetts
- List of Sheriffs of Hampden County, Massachusetts

=== Michigan ===
In Michigan, sheriffs are constitutionally mandated, elected county officials. All sheriff's offices have general law enforcement powers throughout their entire county, as well as traditional judicial-process, court-protection (bailiff) and jail-operation powers. Sheriff's offices may primarily patrol areas of their county without municipal police services; however, they are free to patrol anywhere in their county, including cities, villages and charter townships that have their own police services. Occasionally, this results in conflict over jurisdiction between municipal police agencies and sheriff's offices.

In some counties (primarily urban counties such as Oakland, Macomb, Wayne, Kent, Genesee, Saginaw, Bay, Midland and Washtenaw), sheriff's offices provide dedicated police services under contract to some municipalities, in lieu of those municipalities providing their own police services. (Michigan law provides for or requires municipalities, depending upon their structure, to provide dedicated police services.)

The sheriffs of all 83 Michigan counties are members of the Michigan Sheriffs' Association. This professional organization, formed in 1877, promulgates standardized insignias that are used, to varying degrees, by all Michigan sheriff's offices on their uniforms and vehicles.

Notably, the Michigan State Police have general law-enforcement powers throughout the entire state. Thus, all Michigan residents have at least two levels of general police services (state police and sheriff's offices), while residents of a municipality that has its own police service have a third level of general police service.

The Office of Sheriff is created by the Michigan Constitution. As a constitutional officer, the sheriff must operate a county jail, serve and execute all civil writs and process as well as criminal process that are issued pursuant to rule, and produce and maintain records as prescribed by law. In addition, the sheriff operates a Marine Safety Program (with the Department of Natural Resources), provides contracted law enforcement services, and miscellaneous other duties.

Currently the Oakland County Sheriff's Office is the largest full service sheriff's office in the state, overseeing over 1,400 employees and managing an annual budget of over $156 million.

=== Minnesota ===
387.03 POWERS, DUTIES. The sheriff shall keep and preserve the peace of the county, for which purpose the sheriff may require the aid of such persons or power of the county as the sheriff deems necessary. The sheriff shall also pursue and apprehend all felons, execute all processes, writs, precepts, and orders issued or made by lawful authority and to the sheriff delivered, attend upon the terms of the district court, and perform all of the duties pertaining to the office, including investigating recreational vehicle accidents involving personal injury or death that occur outside the boundaries of a municipality, searching and dragging for drowned bodies, and searching and looking for lost persons. When authorized by the board of county commissioners of the county the sheriff may purchase boats and other equipment including the hiring of airplanes for search purposes.

In order to be elected to the office of County Sheriff, the candidate must be actively employed in a law enforcement vocation. The Hennepin County Sheriff's Office is the largest sheriff's office in Minnesota, serving roughly one million residents.

=== Mississippi ===
Sheriffs in the State of Mississippi are elected to four-year terms, with no limits on the number of terms that may be served. The sheriff's office works to prevent crime and build community safety through education, investigation and enforcement. The sheriff's duties generally fall into two broad categories:

1. Law enforcement duties: These duties are specifically to keep the peace within the county, by causing all offenders to enter into bonds, with sureties, for keeping the peace and for appearing at the next circuit court, and by committing such offenders in case of refusal. The sheriff is also charged with the duty to quell riots, routs, affrays and unlawful assemblages, and to prevent lynchings and mob violence.
2. Administrative duties:
  - Serve as the county's jailor—The sheriff is required to keep separate rooms for the sexes, not permitting communication between male and female prisoners, unless they are married; provide fire and lights when necessary and proper; sufficient and clean bedding; and daily wholesome and adequate food and drink.
  - Have charge of the courthouse and jail of his county, of the premises belonging thereto, and of the prisoners in said jail. This includes the protection of the court and prisoners from mob violence, injuries or attacks by mobs, and from trespasses and intruders.
  - Submit a budget of his office's estimated expenses for the next fiscal year including payment of premiums on the bonds and insurance necessary to protect the interest of the county. (i.e. bonds for liability insurance, insurance against false arrest charges, insurance against false imprisonment charges, theft, fire, and other hazards insurance, and hospitalization insurance).
  - Keep books of every kind maps, charts, and other things that may be donated to the county.
  - Keep the Mississippi Department Reports, census reports, statutes of the state, the Mississippi Reports, digests, and legislative journals assigned to his county in the courtroom of the courthouse.
  - Keep a jail docket noting the details of each warrant or mittimus of any person placed in the county jail.
- Hinds County Sheriff's Office is the biggest sheriff office in Mississippi and The county's largest city in population is Jackson, the state's capital.

=== Missouri ===
There are 114 counties and one independent city (City of St. Louis) in Missouri. Sheriffs in Missouri are elected to a four-year term and is considered the chief law enforcement officer of the county. The sheriff and his deputies may conduct a variety of duties within their respective jurisdictions. Section 57.100 of the Missouri Revised Statutes states that "Every sheriff shall quell and suppress assaults and batteries, riots, routs, affrays and insurrections; shall apprehend and commit to jail all felons and traitors, and execute all process directed to him by legal authority, including writs of replevin, attachments and final process issued by circuit and associate circuit judges."

Generally, the sheriff is responsible for police patrol in unincorporated areas of the county, but retains full jurisdiction within the entire county. Generally, city or village police handle general law enforcement duties in incorporated areas. In addition, the sheriff is responsible for court security, serving court documents, operating the jail (some jurisdictions have separate county correctional departments), executing warrants, issuing concealed weapon carry permits, and other duties. In the Independent City of St. Louis, the sheriff's duties include court security for the Circuit Court, transporting prisoners between the Courts and detention facilities, serving court papers and eviction notices, and issuing concealed carry permits. Patrol duties are handled by the St. Louis Metropolitan Police Department.

Some sheriff's departments provide School Resource Deputies to public school districts under contract with the local school board. These deputies not only perform law enforcement duties, but act as mentors and instructors in safety and security related matters.

In addition, sheriffs may utilize SWAT or STAR teams, consisting of specially trained deputies who may handle hostage situations, security details, or special events. K-9 units, boat patrols, air patrols, traffic units, reserve units, and Emergency Management Division units are just some of the other specialized divisions that may be formed by the sheriff.

Since January 1, 2010, Missouri Revised Statutes 57.010 states that county sheriffs must have a Missouri Peace Officer's License before they may perform any law enforcement functions. Deputy Sheriffs are considered law enforcement officers, and must be certified by The Department of Public Safety's Peace Officer Standards and Training (POST) Program.

=== Montana ===
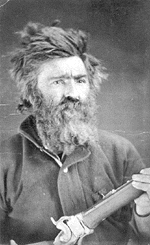
Colston Montana Deputy Sheriff John Jeremiah Garrison Johnston

All 56 Montana counties have sheriff's offices responsible for general law-enforcement functions in areas other than those covered by local city police departments. In larger cities sheriff's offices perform mainly judicial duties such as serving warrants and providing courtroom security. The sheriff, as the county's chief law enforcement officer, has jurisdiction anywhere in the county, including municipalities, where the Sheriff's Office provides assistance and support to local law enforcement agencies. Sheriff's deputies in Montana are certified by The Department of Public Safety's Peace Officer Standards and Training (POST) Program. Sheriff's deputies have the full powers of arrest and can enforce all of state laws more than any other law enforcement officer in the state. Examples include fish and game violations, department of transportation regulations, department of livestock.

The City and County of Butte-Silver Bow is a consolidated city-county that has a unified law enforcement agency, the Butte-Silver Bow Law Enforcement Department, the elected Sheriff of Butte-Silver Bow serves as the agency executive.

Just like in other states, sheriffs in Montana do have the legal authority to call upon the power of the citizenry who live in their jurisdiction to assist them in the performance of their duties. This is provided under Montana Code Annotated 7–32–2121 (6).

=== Nebraska ===
All Nebraska counties have sheriff's offices responsible for general law-enforcement functions in areas other than those covered by local city police departments. Sheriff's deputies in Nebraska are certified by the state law-enforcement commission and have full arrest powers.

=== Nevada ===
There are 17 sheriff's offices in Nevada, and two of them are unique: the Carson City Sheriff's Office was formed in 1967 from the merger of the Carson City Police Department and the Ormsby County Sheriff's Office, and the Las Vegas Metropolitan Police Department was formed in 1973 from the merger of the Clark County Sheriff's Office and the Las Vegas Police Department.

=== New Hampshire ===
The New Hampshire position of High Sheriff dates back to pre-Revolutionary War days. Since 1840, there have been 10 counties in the state, each with a High Sheriff. These sheriffs and their deputies are the highest ranking and most powerful uniformed law-enforcement officers in the state. The state constitution gives the sheriff of each county full law-enforcement authority throughout the county. In 1911, this authority was expanded by the state legislature to include the entire state. Sheriffs are elected to two-year terms without term limits. The sheriff is responsible for civil process, transport of prisoners, and criminal and civil warrants. Patrol services are not performed in every county, but sheriffs and the state police have contractual dedicated patrol or traffic enforcement only agreements with some towns. Most county sheriff's offices provide dispatch service for many of the county's communities. Sheriffs are also responsible for the security in all the county courthouses throughout the state. Finally, sheriffs are responsible for the prisoners in the local district courts throughout the state.

=== New Jersey ===
Pursuant to Article VII Section II of the New Jersey State Constitution, each county in New Jersey is required to have three elected administrative officials known as "constitutional officers." These officers are the County Clerk and County Surrogate (both elected for five-year terms of office) and the County Sheriff (elected for a three-year term).

Sheriffs in New Jersey are sworn law-enforcement officers with full arrest powers. They also serve writs and other legal process and perform court-security functions. In some counties, responsibility for the county jail rests with the sheriff's office; in other counties, this responsibility rests with a separate corrections department. In most counties, the police functions provided by the sheriff's office are limited to patrolling county property such as parks, courts, county facilities, and roads; plus, providing specialized units and support to local police, e.g., bomb squads, emergency response (SWAT) and investigative units.

Essex County Sheriff's Bureau of Narcotics is featured in the film American Gangster which stars Denzel Washington and Russell Crowe. The Essex County Sheriff and the Hudson County Sheriff, also holds the unique title of the Office of Emergency Management and serves a highly populated urban area including Newark, in Essex County, which is New Jersey's largest city and Jersey City, in Hudson County, which is New Jersey's second largest city. Union County also has a separate county-wide police force, which fulfills many of the police functions provided by sheriff's offices in other counties.

All areas of New Jersey are incorporated municipalities and the vast majority have their own local police agencies that provide general law enforcement. The New Jersey State Police provides primary law enforcement in only a few rural areas in Southern and North Western NJ that lack local police.

=== New Mexico ===
County Sheriffs in New Mexico are regular law enforcement officials and have the authority to perform law enforcement duties at any location within their county of jurisdiction, but they primarily focus on unincorporated rural areas, while leaving law enforcement functions within the limits of incorporated municipalities to town or city police departments. Sheriffs occasionally assist local police departments with law enforcement in incorporated cities and towns, particularly when such assistance is requested by local police.

=== New York ===
Like most other states, sheriffs and deputy sheriffs in the State of New York are regular law-enforcement officers with full police powers and duties such as patrol work, prisoner transport, civil process.

Many sheriff's offices in New York State also have canine, marine, aviation and SWAT units, as well as various other specialized units. In several sheriff's offices throughout the state, an undersheriff is often the warden of the county jail or second-in-command of the entire agency.

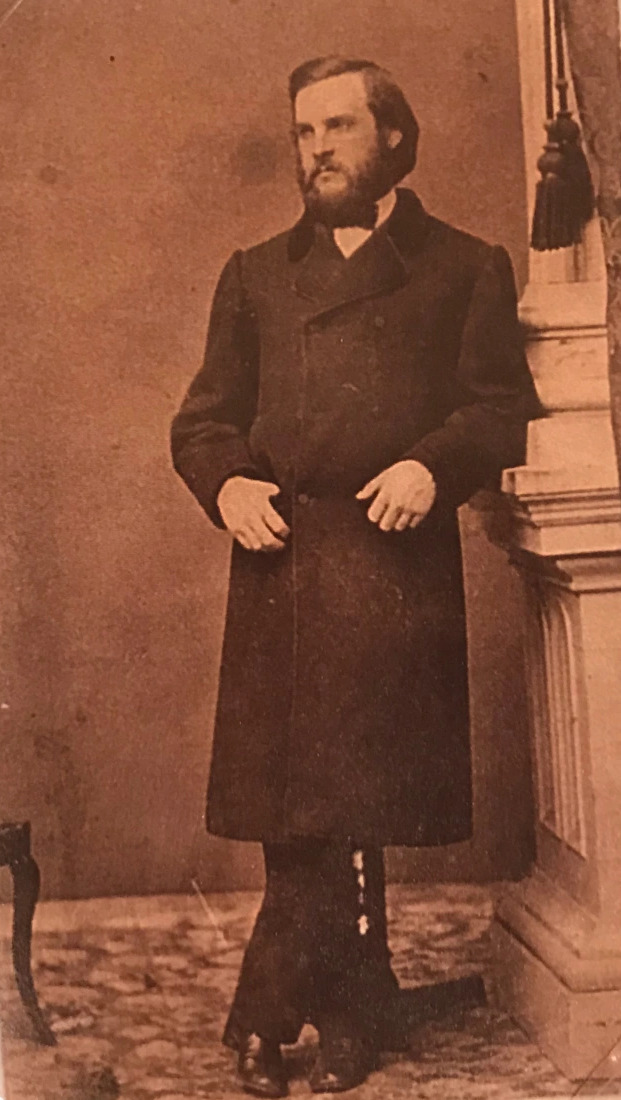
Grover Cleveland Erie County NY Sheriff 1871-1873

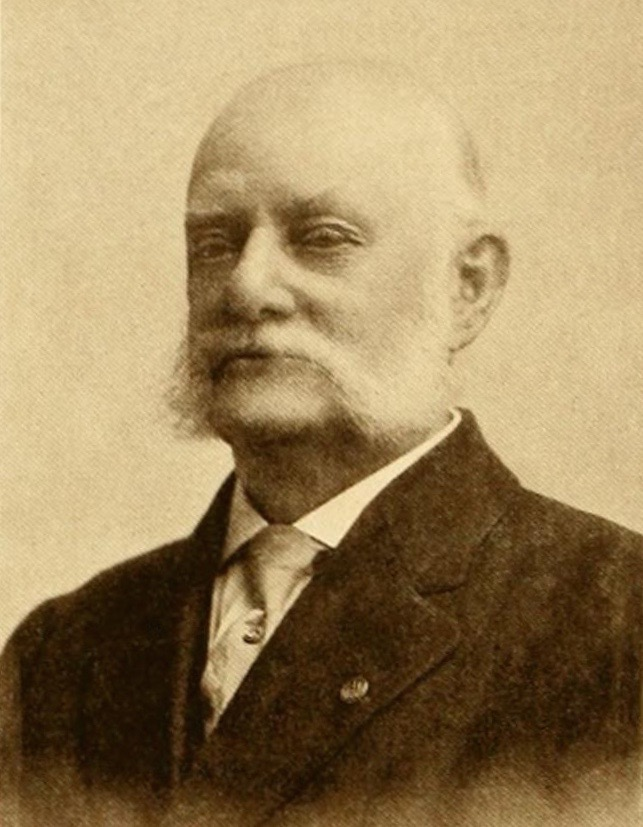
Lewis R. Stegman King's County NY Sheriff 1881

Until recently, most sheriff's officers wore a standardized uniform (black pants and shirt with dark gray straw Stetson hat in the summer and a black felt Stetson hat in the winter with a black Class A jacket for the dress uniform and a black leather jacket for the winter) and all patrol vehicles were marked in the same manner (white with red stripes, etc.). Several counties have moved away from these practices. Patrol cars in these counties have different vehicle markings, and deputy sheriffs wear different uniforms. Some examples are Ulster County, which has dark gray uniforms similar to the New York State Police; and Warren County, whose deputy sheriffs wear tan shirts with dark brown pants. Dutchess County Deputy Sheriffs wear tactical Class B uniforms consisting of black shirts and black pants and a Class A uniform with light blue shirts with darker blue pants. In Suffolk County, the sheriff vehicles are black and white (similar to the police/sheriff vehicle scheme used in California). In New York City, deputy sheriffs wear a uniform very similar to sworn NYPD personnel. Ontario County Sheriff's deputies wear the traditional uniform; black pants, black shirt with brass buttons, and a black stetson.

Currently there are 57 county sheriff's offices, and one city sheriff's office (see below) which covers the five boroughs (counties) of New York City. The largest sheriff's office in New York State is the Erie County Sheriff's Office, followed by the Suffolk County Sheriff's Department with around 275 deputies and 900 correction officers.

Sheriffs in New York State (outside of New York City, Nassau and Westchester Counties) are elected for three or four-year terms, depending on the vote of the county government, specifically the county legislature. The sheriff of New York City is appointed by the mayor (see below) and the sheriffs of Nassau County and Westchester County are appointed by the county executives of those respective counties.

==== New York County ====
The New York County, although it comprises five counties, currently has a single Sheriff's Office, part of the New York City Department of Finance. The Sheriff's Office is headed by a sheriff, appointed by the mayor.

As the primary civil law enforcement agency of the City of New York, the Sheriff's Office typically acts as the enforcer of civil judgments won by the city against individuals and businesses. The agency also enforces judgments on behalf of private petitioners' as well. Though the sheriff and their deputies retain their status as peace officers/law enforcement officers, traditional patrol and other law enforcement functions are handled by other departments: the NYPD oversees law enforcement; the Department of Corrections manages the city's jails; the Office of the Medical Examiner handles the coroner functions; and Court Officers handle security for the courts themselves and in lock-ups within court buildings. The New York City Sheriff's Office does provide criminal investigation services in cases involving city tax and deed fraud, as well as illegal tobacco distribution and smuggling.

The sheriff or their deputies serve processes and writs; seize property and handle evictions pursuant to court orders; execute mental hygiene and family court arrest warrants, along with any other type of arrest ordered by the courts and directed to the sheriff; enforce traffic and parking laws, and perform other law enforcement/peacekeeping functions necessary to maintain public order.

The Sheriff's Office has five county/borough field offices and several citywide units. The agency has five undersheriffs, each in charge of a county/borough. Approximately 150 deputy sheriffs of various ranks are employed by the agency, along with an assortment of civilian support staff.

The sheriff, undersheriffs, and deputy sheriffs of the City of New York have peace officer powers and are authorized to carry firearms both on and off duty (as per the New York State Criminal Procedure Law).

The Sheriff's Office is not to be confused with New York City Marshals, who are private businessmen licensed by the city and authorized by the courts as independent public officers to be hired by individuals and businesses to enforce civil judgments. New York City Marshals are not city employees; they keep a portion of what they seize as profit instead of collecting a salary from the city. New York City Marshals are not peace officers.

=== North Carolina ===
The office of sheriff is the oldest public office in North Carolina (established in 1662). It was constitutionally mandated in North Carolina in 1776. It is an elected law enforcement office.

The sheriff has duties in all three branches of law enforcement: Policing, Courts/Criminal Justice and Corrections/Jail. The Office of the Sheriff is the primary law enforcement agency for the unincorporated areas of North Carolina's counties. The sheriff, as the county's chief law enforcement officer, has jurisdiction anywhere in the county, including municipalities, where the Sheriff's Office provides assistance and support to municipal law enforcement agencies, who have primary jurisdiction in their respective municipalities.

Law enforcement duties of this Office include patrolling the counties, preventing crime, investigating violations of the law, and apprehending law violators. In addition, support services, such as communications, evidence, and property control services are provided. The sheriff is also responsible for keeping and maintaining the common jail of the county, which currently consists of separate detention facilities at the County Public Safety Centers and the Detention Annex if required by the counties. The Office is responsible for transporting prisoners for court appearances.

In the area of judicial services, the Office of the Sheriff serves as the enforcement arm of the North Carolina General Court of Justice. The Office serves civil and criminal processes issued by the courts, which often includes arresting persons and bringing them before the courts, as well as the seizure and sale of personal and real property to satisfy court judgments. The sheriff is responsible for courtroom security in the District and Superior courtrooms in the county.

Other miscellaneous duties of the Office mandated by the State include, concealed handgun permits, parade and picketing permits, and maintaining registries of sexual offenders and domestic violators.

In North Carolina, the sheriff is elected to a 4-year term, and may not be a felon. A county sheriff is responsible not to county authorities but to the citizens of the county. County governments are responsible for providing funding to the Sheriff's Office.

The sheriff is the highest-ranking law enforcement officer of each of the state's 100 counties, but possess no authority over state or municipal officers. The sheriff has complete at-will power to hire and terminate deputies and other sheriff's office personnel at his-her will and pleasure. Deputies and jailers serve a term concurrent with the sheriff, not to exceed 4 years and must be re-sworn every 4 years. Jailers are custodial officers and must complete a 160-hour jailer training course, though some are also dually trained and sworn as deputies. Deputies must complete the state mandated 600+ hour Basic Law Enforcement Training (BLET) course, or do a "re-entry" or reentry syllabus for former or lateral (out of state officers). Other than the reentry option, the training for deputies is the same as for police officers, and other certified officers. The sheriff however, can hire deputies and has one year to get them trained and certified. This allows a sheriff who comes in office to, if he-she chooses, to replace an entire or partial department with untrained appointees and there is then one year to get the new deputies trained and certified. Deputies are a political extension of the sheriff and have no independent statutory power and when an arrest or action is made in an official capacity, it is done in the name of the sheriff as a de facto power of attorney.

Exceptions to the County Sheriff in North Carolina are that of two of North Carolina's Counties, Gaston and Mecklenburg. These Counties have police forces for the whole county, as well as a Sheriff Department that is responsible for the jails, courts and civil process, in addition to gun permits, sex offender database and other specific sheriff duties.

- In Gaston County, the Gaston County Police Department is responsible for county-wide police services for the incorporated and unincorporated areas of the county, while overlapping with City and Township police. The Gaston County Sheriffs Office is responsible for the jails and the court system in Gastonia, the county seat.
- In Charlotte, the Charlotte-Mecklenburg Police Department is responsible for the incorporated areas of Charlotte, and the unincorporated areas of the county, while the Mecklenburg County Sheriff's Office is responsible for the jails, courts, and warrant service; though they also may perform other law enforcement duties in the county at their discretion.

=== North Dakota ===
Sheriffs in North Dakota are the chief law enforcement officers in the 53 counties. They are elected to four-year terms. Officers for the department have full arrest powers and general enforcement, including enforcing all state and local laws, maintaining jail facilities, transporting prisoners and mentally ill patients, serving legal papers, holding public sales of property under court orders and attending district court.

Officers service rural areas. In recent years, the decreasing tax base has led many small towns to contract with the counties for law enforcement service.

=== Ohio ===
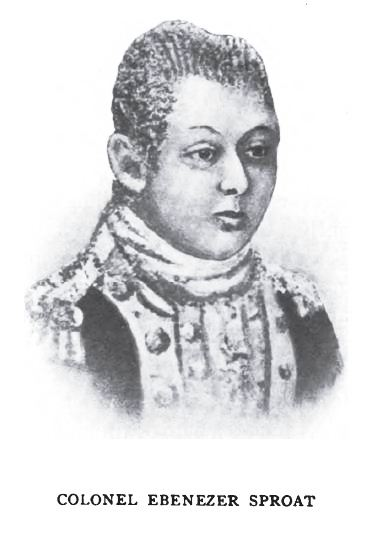
Ebenezer Sproat, first sheriff in the Northwest Territory.

Until Ohio achieved statehood in 1803, the position of sheriff was filled through appointments made at the pleasure of the Territorial Governor, Arthur St. Clair. The first sheriff on the record in Ohio and the Northwest Territory was Colonel Ebenezer Sproat, who served fourteen years in the position. When he was appointed in 1788, Colonel Sproat's jurisdiction covered all of Washington County; this enormous area of land then included all of eastern Ohio from the Ohio River to Lake Erie. The "First to Serve Since 1788" motto on Ohio sheriff vehicles refers to Sheriff Sproat's service.

After statehood, only three public offices in Ohio were filled via the electoral-process system. The position of sheriff was one of them. Through this new system, William Skinner became the first elected sheriff in Ohio. Since the early 19th century, Ohio sheriffs have been elected at the county level for four-year terms.

In each of the 88 counties of Ohio, the sheriff is the chief law-enforcement officer. The primary duties of the sheriff are to provide common pleas court services and corrections on a countywide basis, and full police protection to the unincorporated areas of the county; however, the sheriff also maintains full police jurisdiction in all municipalities, townships, and villages. Each sheriff is also statutorily required to provide line law enforcement, court security and service of papers, jail operations, extradition process, and transportation of prisoners.

In an effort to become consistent on a statewide level, Ohio sheriffs and deputies wear a standardized uniform, and all patrol vehicles are marked in the same manner.

=== Oklahoma ===
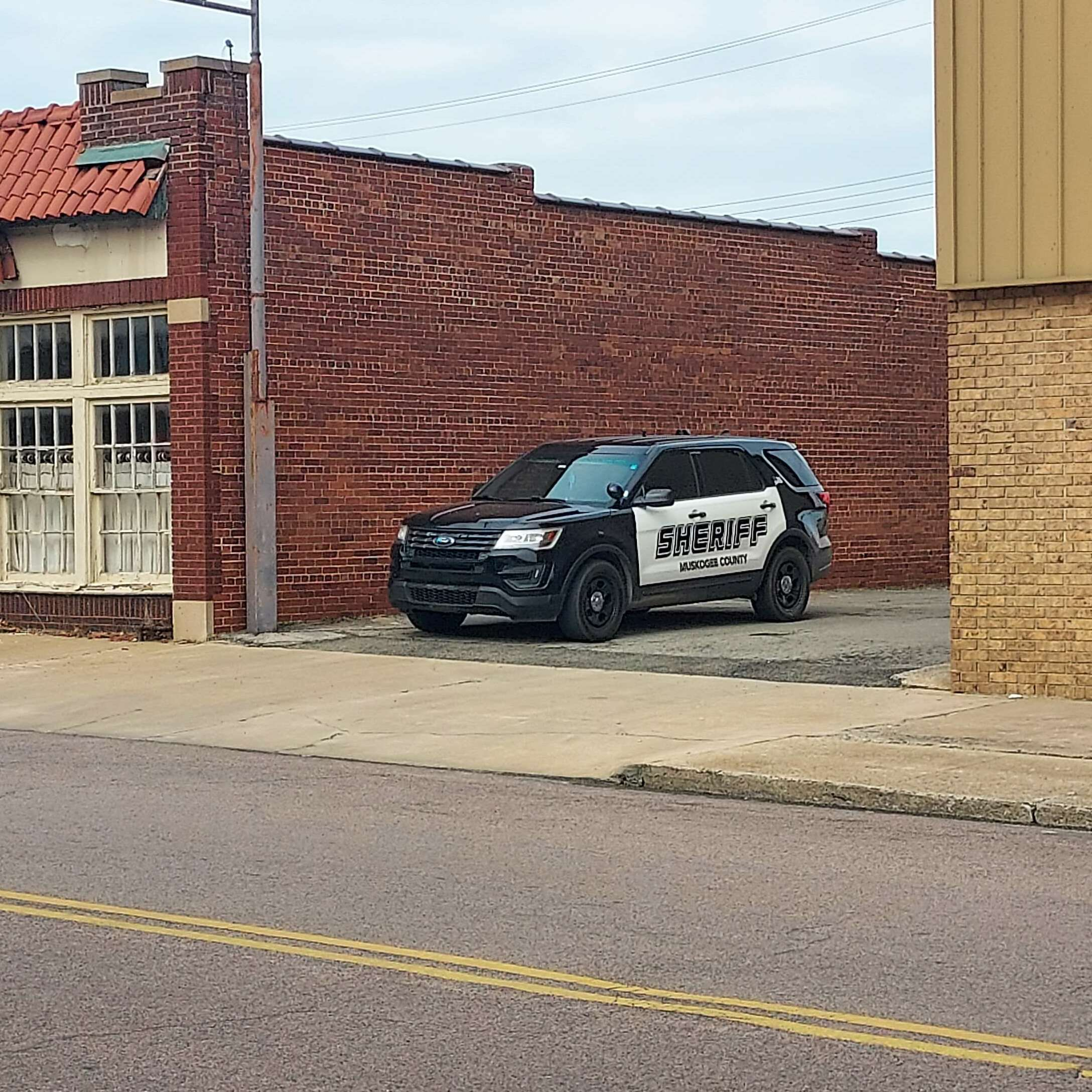
A Muskogee County Sheriff vehicle parked in Muskogee, Oklahoma.

Oklahoma's Sheriffs, whose primary role is as an officer of the court, provide full services, that is, providing traditional law-enforcement functions such as countywide patrol and investigations. As the chief peace officer of each of Oklahoma's 77 counties, the Sheriffs serve and execute all process, writs, precepts and orders issued or made by lawful authorities, namely the courts. The sheriff's office also provides security for judges and courthouses. The Sheriffs are in charge of and have custody over the jail of their county, and all the prisoners in the jail are under the sheriff's supervision, with the sheriff serving as the county's jailer.

Under their law-enforcement responsibilities, the Sheriffs are responsible for ensuring that the peace is preserved, riots are suppressed, and that unlawful assemblies and insurrections are controlled throughout their county. To ensure justice is administered, the sheriff is empowered to apprehend any person charged with a felony or breach of the peace and may attend any court within the county. The sheriffs are also empowered to conscript any person or persons of their county that they may deem necessary to fulfill their duties.

=== Oregon ===
General duties of sheriff

The sheriff is the chief executive law enforcement officer and conservator of the peace of the county. In the execution of the office of sheriff, it is the sheriff's duty to:

1. Arrest and commit to prison all persons who break the peace, or attempt to break it, and all persons guilty of public offenses.
2. Defend the county against those who, by riot or otherwise, endanger the public peace or safety.
3. Execute the process and orders of the courts of justice or of judicial officers, when delivered to the sheriff for that purpose, according to law.
4. Execute all warrants delivered to the sheriff for that purpose by other public officers, according to law.
5. Attend, upon call, the Supreme Court, Court of Appeals, Oregon Tax Court, circuit court, justice court or county court held within the county, and to obey its lawful orders or directions. [Amended by 1985 c.339 §1]

There are 36 counties in Oregon with 36 elected sheriffs, each holding a four-year term of office. Sheriffs in Oregon provide full-service law enforcement, enforcing all state and local laws, maintaining active traffic safety and enforcement units, managing the county jail, providing marine boating safety patrols, being responsible for county Search and Rescue, and providing law enforcement services for the courts. Many Oregon sheriffs have dedicated specialized teams that include traffic safety, SWAT, interagency drug teams, K9, and rescue.

=== Pennsylvania ===
Pennsylvania sheriffs legally have all traditional law enforcement powers. But, since the establishment of the Pennsylvania State Police in 1905, in practice most of the 67 counties' sheriff's offices perform traditional court-related functions, transporting prisoners to and from court, etc.

The status of Pennsylvania's county sheriffs was in a legal gray area for many years. While sheriffs routinely provided court security, prisoner transport, civil process services and bench warrant arrests, it was unclear whether they had law-enforcement powers. From the 1970s through the early 1990s, a number of defendants charged by deputy sheriffs with crimes attempted to suppress the results of their arrests, on the basis that the deputies were not bona fide law-enforcement officers.

In Commonwealth of Pennsylvania vs. Leet, a 1991 decision by the Pennsylvania Superior Court, a 2–1 majority of the Court held that deputy sheriffs had no law-enforcement powers. That decision was reversed by the Pennsylvania Supreme Court in a 1994 decision by Justice John P. Flaherty. He held that sheriffs have the power to enforce motor-vehicle laws (at issue in this case) for violations committed in their presence. In his majority opinion, Justice Flaherty explored the historical roots of the office of sheriff in the United Kingdom and the United States and concluded that the powers developed as a matter of common law:

Though it may be unnecessary to cite additional authority, Blackstone confirms the common-law power of the sheriff to make arrests without warrant for felonies and for breaches of the peace committed in his presence. Blackstone, Commentaries on the Common Law, Vol. IV, at 289. Indeed, such powers are so widely known and so universally recognized that it is hardly necessary to cite authority for the proposition. To make the point, how few children would question that the infamous Sheriff of Nottingham had at least the authority to arrest Robin Hood.

Sheriffs and their deputies in Pennsylvania can therefore make arrests for felonies and breaches of the peace committed in their presence. They are required by statute to be trained and certified by the Pennsylvania Commission on Crime and Delinquency.

In the early 21st century, every Pennsylvania county has a Sheriff's Office. Most are still elected, but Northampton and Luzerne counties have adopted home rule charters that stipulate the sheriff will be an appointed position and no longer elected. This has led to some overlap in places such as Allegheny County, where the County Police are responsible for supporting local law-enforcement and patrolling county-owned property, including the Pittsburgh International Airport.

Similarly, the Delaware County Courthouse and Park Police Department provides security police functions. With the newly reestablished law enforcement powers of the County Sheriff, however, this has led to some power struggles.

==== Philadelphia County ====
As part of the government of the City of Philadelphia, which encompasses the county, the sheriff is elected for a four-year term. The sheriff provides basic court-related services such as transporting prisoners, providing courthouse security, and other duties with regard to service of process and summonses that are issued by county and state courts. The sheriff also carries out evictions and conducts auction sales of real property in foreclosure and seizures of personal property (chattel) to satisfy a judgment. The Philadelphia Sheriff's Department has indicated its intention to carry out community law-enforcement while continuing its statutory duties.

=== Rhode Island ===
The Rhode Island Division of Sheriffs is a statewide law enforcement agency under the Rhode Island Department of Public Safety. Division personnel fall under the command of the Chief Sheriff, currently David M. DeCesare. The Division is responsible for "courtroom security and cellblocks in all state courthouses, training of personnel, extradition and civil service, and transportation of individuals charged with crimes."

=== South Carolina ===
There are 46 sheriffs in South Carolina.

South Carolina has suffered a rash of corruption among its sheriffs, with 13 having been convicted of crimes between 2010 and 2021. This has prompted calls for reforms. A bill was put forward in 2019 to bar anyone who had been convicted of a felony, even if they were pardoned, from running for sheriff.

In 2020, Kristin Graziano was elected sheriff of Charleston County, becoming the first woman and first openly gay person to serve as sheriff in South Carolina.

=== South Dakota ===
In the state of South Dakota, the sheriff's duties, by law, are as follows: "Sheriff to preserve the peace—Apprehension of felons—Execution of process. The sheriff shall keep and preserve the peace within his county, for which purpose he is empowered to call to his aid such persons or power of his county as he may deem necessary. He must pursue and apprehend all felons, and must execute all writs, warrants, and other process from any court or magistrate which shall be directed to him by legal authority." Sheriff's in South Dakota have a duty to follow all orders of the South Dakota Attorney General. Sheriff's in South Dakota have a duty to provide information to their county State's Attorney, and to cooperate with investigation and criminal prosecution.

Every county in the state of South Dakota is required to hold an election for Sheriff every four years. There is no limit to how many consecutive four year terms an individual can serve as sheriff. Sheriff's offices in South Dakota typically rely on the assistance of the South Dakota Highway Patrol for SWAT and high risk warrant services. The sheriff in all counties has full law enforcement powers throughout the county including in incorporated municipalities, sheriff's serve both criminal and civil court documents, provide courthouse security, conduct investigations, and typically operate a county jail. Some counties contract jail space for other counties to use. (Fees are often determined by the number of inmates housed per day.) Sheriffs are required by state law to be paid a minimum annual salary. The law and guidelines are shown below. Sheriffs' salary schedule. The board of county commissioners shall establish, by resolution, the salary payable to the sheriff. The salary payable may not be less than the following schedule based upon the most recent decennial federal census of population of counties.

| County population | Salary schedule |
|---|---|
| Below 10,000 | $35,700 |
| 10,000–14,999 | $38,700 |
| 15,000–24,999 | $39,900 |
| 25,000–69,999 | $44,700 |
| 70,000 and over | $48,600 |

The board of county commissioners may not decrease the salary of the sheriff during consecutive terms of office of the sheriff. Any sheriff having responsibility for managing a full-time jail shall receive an additional ten percent added to the base salary listed in this section.

=== Tennessee ===
The Tennessee Constitution requires each county to elect a sheriff to a four-year term. In all Tennessee counties except one, the sheriff is an official with full police powers, county-wide, although Tennessee sheriffs and their deputies generally perform the patrol portion of their duties in unincorporated areas of their counties if the municipalities have their own police departments. The exception to the rule is Davidson County. In Davidson County, the sheriff has the primary responsibility of serving civil process and jail functions without the common law powers to keep the peace. Protection of the peace is instead the responsibility of the Metropolitan Nashville Police Department under the county's Metropolitan Charter. The Metropolitan Charter did not remove the Davidson County Sheriff's status as a Law Enforcement officer however. It is simply not their primary function as it was prior to the consolidation of the City of Nashville and Davidson County.

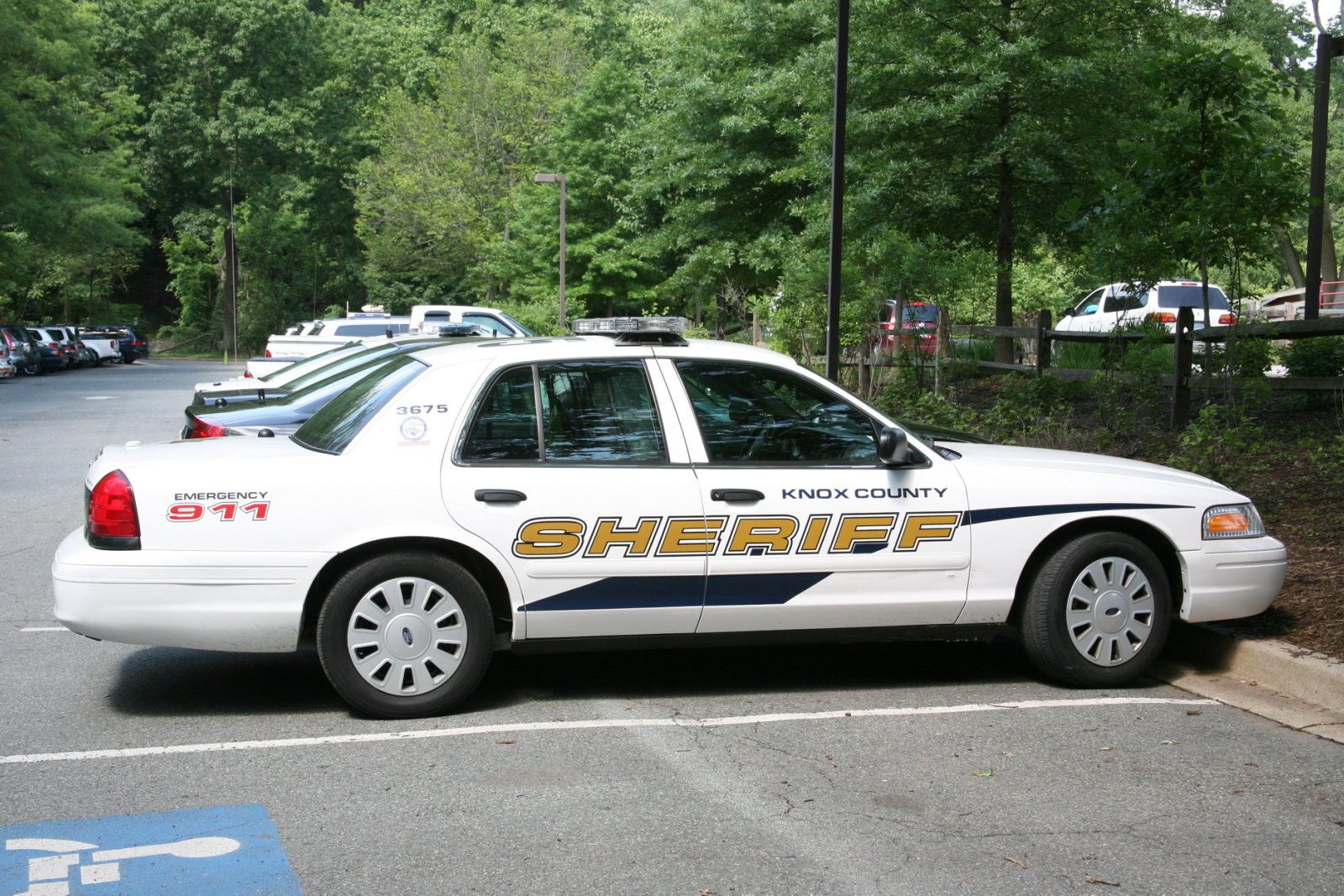
Knox County, Tennessee sheriff's vehicle

=== Texas ===
The Texas Constitution (Article 5, Section 23) provides for the election of a sheriff in each one of the 254 counties. Currently, the term of office for Texas sheriffs is four years. However, when vacancies arise, the commissioners court of the respective county may appoint a replacement to serve out the remaining term.

In Texas, sheriffs and their deputies are fully empowered peace officers with county-wide jurisdiction and thus, may legally exercise their authority in unincorporated and incorporated areas of a county. However, they primarily provide law enforcement services for only the unincorporated areas of a county and do not normally patrol in incorporated cities which have their own police agencies. Sheriffs and their deputies have statewide warrantless arrest powers for any criminal offense (except for certain traffic violations) committed within their presence or view. They may also serve arrest warrants anywhere in the state.

The duties of a Texas Sheriff generally include providing law enforcement services to residents, keeping the county jail, providing bailiffs for the county and district courts within the county, and in some cases serving process issued therefrom (the office of the constable is responsible for most civil process).

==== Harris County ====
The Harris County Sheriff's Office is the largest sheriff's office in Texas and fourth largest in the US, with a sworn employee count of 2,537 in 2005. In 2000, 60% of deputies were assigned to jail operations, 26% to patrol, 12% to investigations, and 1% to process serving.

The smallest sheriff's office in Texas is in Borden County, with a sheriff and a deputy.

=== Utah ===
Sheriffs in Utah are elected by all voting residents within their county. The sheriff must be a Utah State Certified Peace Officer when elected or must be certified shortly after the election. All peace officers in Utah are certified by the Utah Peace Officer's Academy, known as POST (Peace Officer Standardization and Training).

Sheriff's deputies primarily offer routine law enforcement services to the unincorporated portions of the county, but they have authority to arrest anywhere in the state or outside the state for crimes committed within the state. Persons arrested by Utah Peace Officers outside of the State of Utah must be turned over to local authorities for extradition unless they are arrested following a hot pursuit which exits the state.

Additionally, sheriffs deputies are responsible for security in courts with bailiffs employed for that purpose. A portion of the sheriff's office carries out civil process at the direction of the courts, such as eviction or process service of some legal documents. Utah sheriffs deputies also operate the jail within their county. Sheriffs departments in Utah may also organize major crimes task force for crimes such as drug trafficking or gangs that may require coordination between city, county, state and federal law enforcement.

The oldest sheriff's office in Utah is the Salt Lake County Sheriff's Office, which dates back to shortly after the arrival of the Mormon pioneers in 1847. The department's patrol division was disbanded on midnight of Friday, January 1, 2010, and replaced by the Unified Police Department of Greater Salt Lake (UPD). UPD served the county in a patrol capacity for 14 years until legislation was passed in early 2023 mandating the County Sheriff separate from Unified Police. At midnight on Monday, July 1, 2024, the two agencies were separated re-establishing the patrol and investigations divisions being formed as the Law Enforcement Bureau of the Salt Lake County Sheriff's Office. The sheriff of Salt Lake County now serves as the executive Salt Lake County Sheriff's Office solely and Unified Police Department has appointed a chief of police. The Salt Lake County Sheriff's Office is celebrating 175 years of dedicated service to the county in 2024.

=== Vermont ===
Sheriff responsibilities in Vermont include furnishing security for fourteen county superior courts and two district courts, serving civil and criminal papers, transportation of prisoners, patrolling towns, motor vehicle and snowmobile enforcement, and furnishing security for special events.

=== Virginia ===
The position of sheriff is established by the Virginia Constitution, with the sheriff and their deputies having both civil and concurrent criminal jurisdiction countywide. Sheriffs' terms are for four years and are not term limited. Unlike other states, the sheriff is not necessarily the chief law enforcement officer; in a city that has a police department, a Chief of Police has that distinction according to statute. However, a sheriff is chief law enforcement officer in any county. In such areas, the Chief of Police is the highest-ranking officer, such as in incorporated towns or cities.

Virginia is unique in that the 38 Independent cities are independent jurisdictions and are completely separate from any county. Thus, most cities (with few exceptions such as Poquoson and Franklin) have elected sheriffs, most of which focus on court and jail operations. By law, sheriffs can enforce all the laws of the Commonwealth in the jurisdiction they serve. Some city sheriffs (such as Portsmouth and Newport News) also work alongside the city police in responding to calls and enforcing traffic violations.

In cities such as Poquoson and Franklin, these cities grew out of a county and still use that county's sheriff for civil process and court services. Those sheriff's offices still have concurrent jurisdiction in those cities but do not generally exercise them, allowing the city police to handle criminal/traffic matters.

All sheriffs are responsible for civil process, jails, serving levies and holding sheriff's sales to satisfy judgements.

Since 1983, when the General Assembly passed legislation allowing counties to establish police departments by referendum, only seven counties have done so. In most of those counties, such as Henrico and Chesterfield, the sheriff's offices exercise criminal enforcement authority sharing it with the county police, but generally let the county police investigate most crime.

The city of Williamsburg incorporated as a city from James City County in 1699. Prior to 1983, the sheriff's office handled all police functions for James City County while a sheriff performed court/jail functions for Williamsburg. When James City County established its county police department, that department operated under the county sheriff for two years before becoming a separate agency. Williamsburg's sheriff's office comprised only 8 personnel, it eventually merged with the county's sheriff's office to form the Williamsburg-James City County Sheriff's office.

In the early 1990s the General Assembly mandated the uniforms for all sheriffs as being dark brown shirts with tan pants that have a brown stripe. Sheriff's Office vehicles were to be dark brown with a five-point star on the front doors and "Sheriff's Office" on the trunk. The five-point star must have the jurisdiction's name in a half circle on the star and "Sheriff's Office" in a half circle under that.

In the early first decade of the 21st century, legislation was passed to allow sheriffs to purchase white vehicles (if agreed to by the city or county), and allowing sheriffs' deputies to wear any color uniform the sheriff chose. Sheriffs' vehicles still must have the star on the front doors and markings on the trunk as before.

The Sheriff's Office, in conjunction with local police departments, assist with controlling traffic, issuing traffic summonses, and working with state and local law-enforcement agencies. Additionally, sheriff's deputies aid the county police, the United States Marshals Service, and the Federal Bureau of Investigation in a joint fugitive task force that provides apprehension and arrest of felons who face current warrants. Sheriffs and police also share the responsibility of executing detention orders for those who are ordered to receive mental health care, but if the subject is being transported, frequently the jurisdiction's deputies will conduct the transport.

There is no distinction made by title, all those who work for a sheriff are deputies. All deputies and police officers must meet state certification standards as set by DCJS (Department of Criminal Justice Services).

By law, sheriffs are not elected at the same time. County sheriffs are sworn into office on even-numbered years; city sheriffs are sworn into office on odd-numbered years. All deputies must be re-sworn after each election. Sheriffs have complete authority to hire and fire as they see fit; deputy sheriffs serve at the sole pleasure of the sheriff. Sheriff's offices are completely funded by the state, unless a county or city wishes to supplement with funding.

=== Washington ===
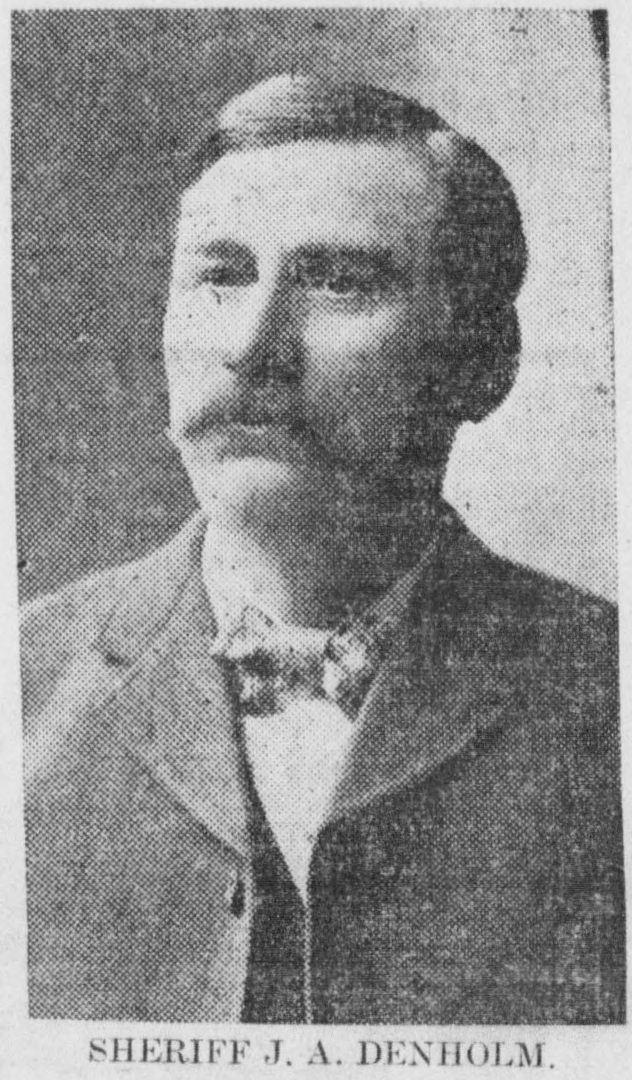
Pierce County, Washington sheriff J.A. Denholm, 1904

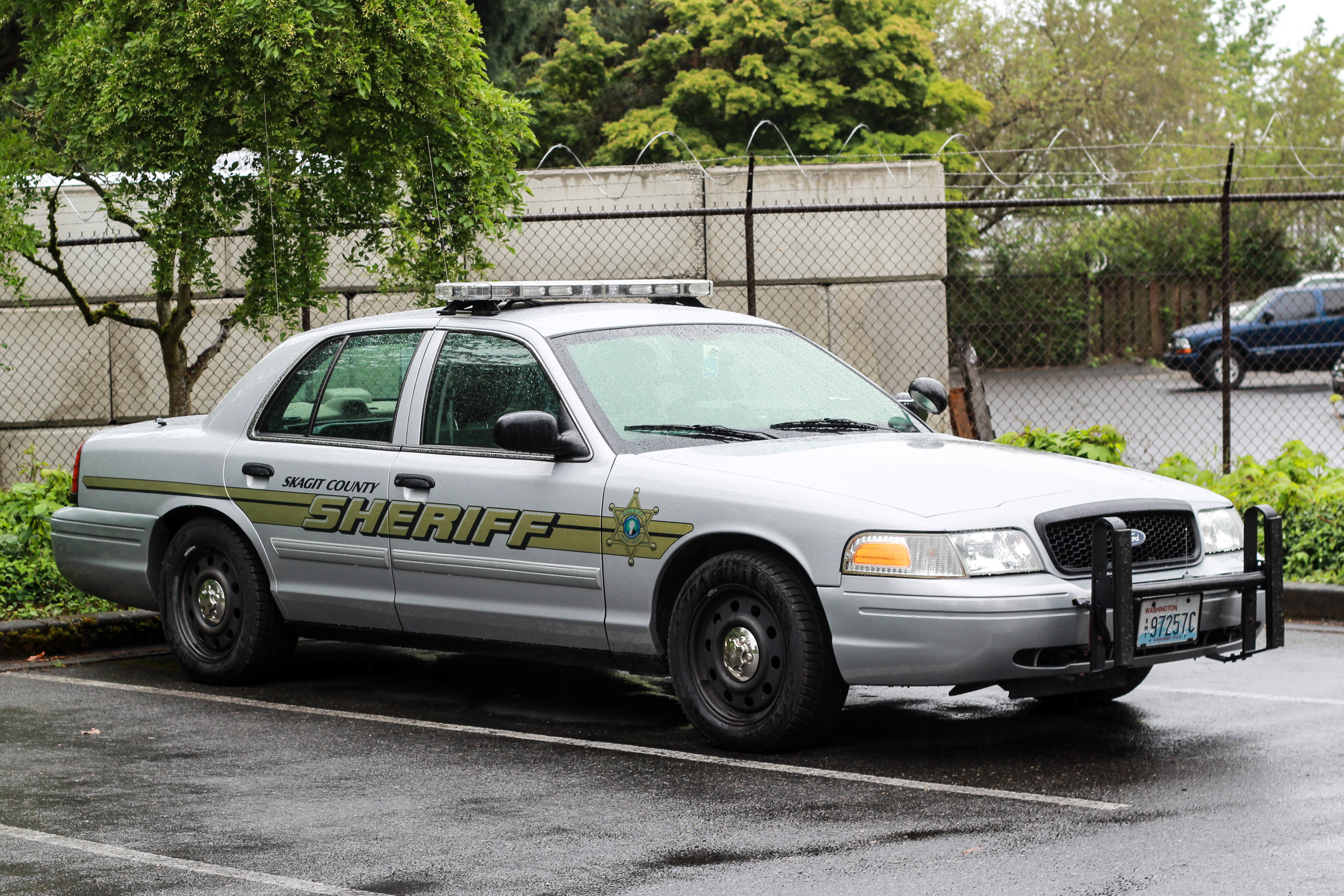
Skagit County, Washington sheriff's vehicle

In Washington, each sheriff of the thirty-nine counties with the exception of King County is an elected official serving a four-year term.

The voters of Pierce County voted to pass Charter Amendment 1 on November 7, 2006, to change the sheriff's position from appointed to elected. The first sheriff's election in 30 years was held in 2008.

The sheriff is the chief law-enforcement officer of a county and is empowered to enforce the criminal laws of the State of Washington and the county their office represents, as well as to serve (once the sheriff has received adequate payment for services rendered) or execute civil processes (such as court orders, evictions, property foreclosures, tax warrants) after payment has been made to the civil division of the county sheriff's office;to maintain county jails; to provide courthouse security; and to provide general law enforcement in unincorporated areas. In many cities, police services are contracted to the sheriff's department in lieu of a city police department.

The King County Sheriff is the largest sheriff office in the state. The sheriff in this county, however, has no jurisdiction over the King County Jail as it was separated from their control. King County returned to an appointed sheriff in 2020 by voter initiative.

=== West Virginia ===
In West Virginia, the sheriff of a given county performs two distinct duties. They are the chief law-enforcement officers in the county, although much of this duty is handled by their chief deputies. They are also responsible for the collection of any taxes due to the county. While many sheriffs have a background in professional law enforcement, others are politicians or other local notables. West Virginia sheriffs are limited to two consecutive four-year terms.

=== Wisconsin ===
In Wisconsin, sheriff's departments are responsible for law enforcement in towns and villages not large enough to support their own police departments, or which specifically opt into having those services provided. A sheriff's department may also aid local departments when requested. In Milwaukee County specifically, its sheriff's department is the agency of record for all lettered county trunk highways, the county's freeway system, Milwaukee Mitchell International Airport, unincorporated areas, and the county park system.

=== Wyoming ===
In February 2021, Albany County elected Wyoming's first black sheriff to office.

=== Cherokee Nation ===
The Old Cherokee Nation was divided into seven regional districts. Each district had its own tribal sheriff, with the High Sheriff of the Cherokee Nation overseeing the tribal jail and serving as the chief law enforcement officer of the nation. The first High Sheriff of the Cherokee Nation was Sam Sixkiller.

== Notable American sheriffs ==
- Bat Masterson – Ford County, Kansas
- Benjamin McCulloch – Sacramento, California (1860)
- Buford Pusser – McNairy County, Tennessee portrayed in Walking Tall, and in a suite of songs on Drive-By Truckers' 2004 album, The Dirty South.
- Daniel Boone – Fayette County, Kentucky
- Dave Reichert – King County, Washington, tracked the Green River killer; elected to Congress in 2004.
- David A. Clarke Jr – Milwaukee County, Wisconsin
- Dwight Radcliff – Pickaway County, Ohio, longest serving sheriff in the United States.
- Eugene Coon – Allegheny County (Pittsburgh), Pennsylvania (1969–1996), famous for halting foreclosure sales on laid off steel workers in the recession of the early 1980s.
- Gerald Hege – Davidson County, North Carolina, famous for his "no-deals" behavior and highly unorthodox way of fighting crime. Convicted felon.
- Grover Cleveland – Erie County, New York, the 22nd and 24th President of the United States.
- Grady Judd - Polk County, Florida, well known for his unique way of storytelling about different operations during press conferences.
- Harry Lee – Jefferson Parish, Louisiana, First Asian-American (of Chinese descent) sheriff in American history, who was known for his colorful antics and controversial tactics. He was a dominating force in Louisiana politics. His annual fais do was the largest campaign fundraising event in the country by any local official. Served as Jefferson Parish Sheriff from 1980 until his death in 2007.
- Joe Arpaio – Maricopa County, Arizona (1994–2016), famous for his stance on political issues, including immigration.
- John Harris Behan – Cochise County, Arizona, was sheriff during the gunfight at the O.K. Corral.
- John Bunnell – Former sheriff of Multnomah County, Oregon; most famous for presenting/hosting World's Wildest Police Videos, appearances on COPS, and other acting roles.
- John Coffee Hays – San Francisco, California (1860)
- John D. Stewart – Catoosa County, Georgia, famous for using Pontiac Trans Am's for patrol units.
- Lamar Potts – Coweta County, Georgia
- Lawrence Rainey – Neshoba County, Mississippi 1963–1968, formerly accused but later cleared of charges relating to the violation of civil rights of three Civil Rights workers down Mississippi, back in 1964.
- Lee Baca – Los Angeles County, California, 1998–2014, Sheriff Baca was known to give special treatment for the famous and connected. He created the "Special Reserves Program" so that he could give concealed weapons permits to favored individuals while withholding consideration for others. Forced to retire by pending federal investigations, in 2016 he pleaded guilty, but later withdrew his plea, to a federal felony of lying to the FBI. Baca was convicted and sentenced in 2017, but is currently out, awaiting the results of his appeal.
- Mark Lamb - Pinal County, Arizona (2017–2024), known for Pinal County Sheriff's Office YouTube videos.
- Mike Carona – Orange County, California (1999–2009), dubbed "America's Sheriff" by Larry King.
- Pat Garrett – Lincoln County, New Mexico, famous for killing Billy the Kid.
- Richard Mack – Graham County, Arizona, Mack received national attention for opposition to the Brady Handgun Violence Prevention Act.
- Sam Sixkiller – Cherokee Nation
- Seth Bullock – Deadwood, South Dakota.
- Sherman Block – Los Angeles County Sheriff's Department (1982–2000), highest paid government administrator in the United States.
- Shaquille O'Neal In December 2016, O'Neal was sworn in as a sheriff's deputy in Jonesboro, Georgia as part of Clayton County, Georgia Sheriff's Department.
- Steven Seagal – Famous actor and reserve deputy sheriff in both Louisiana and Arizona, as seen in Steven Seagal: Lawman.
- Terry Johnson – Alamance County, North Carolina, notable for a federal investigation of his office's alleged targeting of Hispanics within the county, of which he was cleared of all wrongdoing.
- Theodore Roosevelt – 26th President of the United States, spent some of his early career as deputy sheriff in Medora, North Dakota.
- Troy Nehls – Fort Bend County, Texas, current Congressional Representative for TX-22.
- William J. Brady – Sheriff of Lincoln County during the Lincoln County Wars in New Mexico, United States. He was killed in an ambush by Billy the Kid.

== Fictional American sheriffs ==
- Nancy Adams, played by Camille Mitchell, sheriff of Lowell County, Kansas on Smallville
- Leigh Brackett from the Halloween films
- Earl Whitehorse in Far Cry 5.
- Jack Carter in Eureka
- Rosco P. Coltrane on the television series The Dukes of Hazzard along with the movies that have followed since
- Liz Forbes, played by Marguerite MacIntyre, is the sheriff of Mystic Falls, Virginia on The Vampire Diaries
- Buford T. Justice of the Smokey and the Bandit films
- Don Lamb, played by Michael Muhney, is the sheriff of Balboa County, California in the TV series Veronica Mars.
- Roy Hardin in the TV series The Punisher.
- Heck Tate, sheriff of Maycomb County in Harper Lee's novel, To Kill a Mockingbird.
- Hildy Granger, played by Suzanne Somers, appointed to take her late husband's place as sheriff of fictional Lakes County, Nevada (near Lake Tahoe) in the TV series She's the Sheriff.
- Walt Longmire, played by Robert Taylor, is the sheriff of Absaroka County, Wyoming in the TV series Longmire.
- Duke Huckelberry in Lego City: Undercover.
- J. W. Pepper of the James Bond films Live and Let Die and The Man with the Golden Gun
- Sheriff Stilinski, played by Linden Ashby, is the sheriff of fictional Beacon Hills, California in Teen Wolf.
- Sydney Snow, played by Jonathan Scarfe, the corrupt sheriff in the TV series Hell on Wheels.
- Emma Swan, played by Jennifer Morrison, is the sheriff of Storybrooke, Maine in Once Upon a Time; she shares her duties with her father, David Nolan/Prince Charming.
- Andy Taylor of The Andy Griffith Show
- Harry S. Truman in Twin Peaks
- Sheriff Woody, voiced by Tom Hanks, is a sheriff in the Toy Story franchise.
- Lucas Hood, who is killed in the pilot, and then impersonated by a criminal, played by Antony Starr, in Banshee.
- Jimmy Brock, played by Tom Skerritt, in Picket Fences.
- Deputy Standall, Alex Standall's father from Thirteen Reasons Why.
- Sheriff Thomas "Tom" Michael Wachowski, from Sonic The Hedgehog (2020), Sonic The Hedgehog 2 (2022), and Sonic The Hedgehog 3 (2025), is the Sheriff of the fictional town of Green Hills, Montana, and Deputy Sheriff Wade Whipple's boss and close friend. He is portrayed by James Marsden
- Deputy Sheriff Wade Whipple is Tom's Deputy and subordinate in the Green Hills Sheriff's Department and close friend. He is portrayed by Adam Pally in Sonic the Hedgehog (2020), Sonic the Hedgehog 2 (2022), Knuckles (2024), and Sonic The Hedgehog 3 (2025).
- The protagonist of Eddington (2025), Joe Cross, is the sheriff of the fictional Sevilla County, New Mexico.
- Jim Valenti, played by William Sadler, in Roswell (TV series).
- Chris Vaughn (portrayed by Dwayne Johnson) in the 2004 film Walking Tall; a former United States Army Special Forces sergeant who becomes the new Sheriff of Kitsap County, Washington, when he discovers the entire county sheriff's office; namely the sheriff before him, Stan Watkins (portrayed by Michael Bowen) and all of his old deputies, are all on casino owner and drug trade mastermind Jay Hamilton's (portrayed by Neal McDonough) payroll. Ironically, Jay Hamilton is also a former friend of Chris.

Other important representations of fictional sheriffs have been Collie Entragian (Desperation and The Regulators), Alan Pangborn in The Dark Half and Needful Things, Edgler Vess in Dean Koontz's novel, Intensity, and Martin Brody of Amity island in the Jaws (novel) and film series.

== Largest sheriffs' offices in the U.S. ==
| Department | State | Full-Time Sworn Personnel (2016) |
|---|---|---|
| Los Angeles Co. | California | 9,915 |
| Cook Co. | Illinois | 6,900 |
| Miami-Dade Co. | Florida | 3,200 |
| Harris Co. | Texas | 2,207 |
| Riverside Co. | California | 2,048 |
| Orange Co. | California | 1,744 |
| Jacksonville | Florida | 1,577 |
| Palm Beach Co. | Florida | 1,539 |
| Orange Co. | Florida | 1,432 |
| Broward Co. | Florida | 1,425 |
| San Diego Co. | California | 1,322 |
| Sacramento Co. | California | 1,246 |
| Hillsborough Co. | Florida | 1,226 |
| Alameda Co. | California | 989 |
| Calcasieu Parish | Louisiana | 927 |
| Dallas Co. | Texas | 832 |
| Pinellas Co. | Florida | 782 |
| Oakland Co. | Michigan | 781 |
| Jefferson Parish | Louisiana | 759 |
| Ventura Co. | California | 747 |
| Shelby Co. | Tennessee | 619 |
| Contra Costa Co. | California | 601 |
| Lee Co. | Florida | 578 |
| Bexar Co. | Texas | 560 |
| Franklin Co. | Ohio | 553 |
| Pasco Co. | Florida | 545 |
| Loudoun Co. | Virginia | 536 |
| Pima Co. | Arizona | 533 |
| Richland Co. | South Carolina | 533 |
| Kern Co. | California | 523 |
| Onondaga Co. | New York | 519 |
| Jefferson Co. | Alabama | 519 |
| El Paso Co. | Colorado | 518 |
| Tulare Co. | California | 516 |
| Jefferson Co. | Colorado | 514 |
| Rapides Parish | Louisiana | 512 |
| Passaic Co. | New Jersey | 505 |
| Cook Co. | Illinois | 500 |
| Manatee Co. | Florida | 494 |
| St. Tammany Parish | Louisiana | 480 |
| Brevard Co. | Florida | 478 |
| Santa Clara Co. | California | 456 |
| Volusia Co. | Florida | 453 |
| Tarrant Co. | Texas | 450 |
| Johnson Co. | Kansas | 449 |
| Bibb Co. | Georgia | 447 |
| Dane Co. | Wisconsin | 446 |
| Greenville Co. | South Carolina | 437 |
| East Baton Rouge Parish | Louisiana | 435 |
| Unified Police Dept. of Greater Salt Lake | Utah | 435 |
| Seminole Co. | Florida | 421 |
| Caddo Parish | Louisiana | 410 |

== See also ==
- County police
- Police memorabilia collecting
- Schultheiß, the equivalent medieval German office
- Sharif, an Arab office sometimes anglicised as "Sheriff"
