= County detective =

In the United States, county detectives or district attorney investigators are peace officers employed by the district attorney's office of their respective county. County detectives generally exist in the Northeastern United States, such as New Jersey and Pennsylvania, where the county sheriff primarily performs court-related duties. Other jurisdictions may refer to them as district attorney investigators.

== Duties and authority ==
=== California ===
In California, district attorney investigators are sworn peace officers pursuant to § 830.1(a) of the California Penal Code.

The San Diego District Attorney currently maintains a law enforcement arm called Bureau of Investigation. It consists of eight divisions, which include 130 district attorney investigators and other non sworn staff. Amongst its law enforcement duties and responsibilities are assignments which may include pre-trial, gang, economic, insurance, fraud investigations; family protection, child abduction, sex crimes, stalking, and special operation investigations. Apart from this, San Diego DA investigators may be assigned to regional local, state and federal task forces such as: computer and high tech crimes, narcotics, auto theft, identity theft, violent crimes, SAFE and fraud.

=== Pennsylvania ===
In Pennsylvania, county detectives are considered "general police officers" by the courts and as defined by statute. Title 16 P.S. § 1440 As such, county detectives are empowered to enforce all the criminal and traffic laws of Pennsylvania.

In conjunction with enforcing the laws of the state, county detectives also perform other duties as dictated by the district attorney. These duties often include assisting the district attorney and assistant district attorneys with the preparation of cases for trial, assisting municipal police departments with the investigation of serious crimes, and acting as the primary investigator for specific types of crime as outlined by the district attorney.

County detectives often work joint investigations with federal, state and other local law enforcement agencies.

Additionally, many county detectives perform drug investigations as members of their county drug task force, which draws its authority from the district attorney of that county.

=== New Jersey ===
In New Jersey, county detectives, also referred to as prosecutor's detectives, are sworn police officers employed by their respective county's Prosecutor's Office.

Prosecutor's detectives are the main county-wide investigative agency in each county, as Sheriff's Offices are generally limited to court-related duties. They work very closely with local and State Police, as there is no unincorporated land in New Jersey.

== See also ==
- County police
