= Gaston County Police Department =

Coordinates: 35.2630°N 81.1883°W

Agency overview
- Formed: 1957

Jurisdictional structure
- Operations jurisdiction: Gaston County, North Carolina, United States
- General nature: Local civilian police

Operational structure
- Headquarters: Gastonia, North Carolina
- Officers: 153
- Civilian employees: 117
- Agency executive: Stephen Zill, Chief

Facilities
- Stations: 1
- Boats: 1

Website
- Official site

The Gaston County Police Department is a law enforcement agency of Gaston County, North Carolina, United States. It is one of only two County Police police agencies within the State of North Carolina along with the Charlotte-Mecklenburg Police Department.

The Gaston County Police Department has the primary responsibility for the enforcement of North Carolina state laws and Gaston County ordinances in unincorporated areas of the county. Law enforcement within the incorporated municipalities of Gaston County is generally the primary responsibility of the police departments of the particular municipalities. However, the Gaston County Police Department is also the primary law enforcement agency for the incorporated cities of High Shoals and Spencer Mountain. They are also authorized to respond to calls in all areas of the county.

The Gaston County Police Department is a separate agency from the Gaston County Sheriff's Office, which has the responsibilities of managing the county jail, protecting the county courthouse, serving civil and criminal documents, and pursuing and arresting fugitives from legal actions taken through the courts.

In 2007, the department had 137 sworn officers and 90 civilian employees with a $11.9 million annual budget.
