= Gaston County Sheriff's Office =

Law enforcement agency in Gaston County, North Carolina

Coordinates: 35.2675°N 81.1834°W

- Abbreviation: GCSO

Jurisdictional structure
- Operations jurisdiction: Gaston, North Carolina, US
- Map of Gaston County Sheriff's Office's jurisdiction
- Area: 364 square miles (940 km^{2})
- Population: 190,365 (2000)
- General nature: Local civilian police

Operational structure
- Headquarters: Gastonia, North Carolina
- Agency executive: Chad Hawkins, Sheriff

Website
- GCSO Website

The Gaston County Sheriff's Office is a law enforcement agency in Gaston County, North Carolina, United States. The sheriff is the chief law enforcement officer for Gaston County. The Gaston County Sheriff's Office has full arrest powers in Gaston County, both criminal and civil, and is responsible for operating the county jail system, protecting the county courthouse, serving civil and criminal documents, evictions, seizure of property or money as ordered by the courts, assisting other law enforcement agencies, service of criminal and civil arrest processes, and pursuing and arresting fugitives from legal actions taken through the courts.

The Sheriff's Office is not primarily responsible for general law enforcement in Gaston County. Law enforcement within the incorporated municipalities of Gaston County is generally the responsibility of the police department of the particular municipality. Responsibility for law enforcement in unincorporated areas of the county rests with the Gaston County Police Department, which was established in 1957.

== Involvement in illegal immigration enforcement ==
Since 2007, the Gaston County Sheriff's Office has been involved with a controversial federal immigration enforcement program. In the "287(g) program", federally trained deputies are authorized to check the immigration status of people who are arrested and taken to the Gaston County Jail. Gaston County is considered one of the leading counties in North Carolina in the detention of illegal immigrants. Critics cite the fact that the primary charges filed against aliens in the Gaston County Jail are traffic violations. From April 2007 through June 2008, 599 Gaston County inmates were interviewed about their immigration status, and 488 were processed for removal from the United States. Those 599 inmates were arrested, collectively, on 735 charges (698 misdemeanors and 37 felonies), including 422 traffic charges (99 for DWI).
