= County police =

Type of law enforcement agency

County police, often called county sheriffs in the United States, are police forces existing primarily in the United States that possess primary jurisdiction over an entire county. England and Wales, two constituent countries of the United Kingdom, are policed by territorial police forces largely formed on a county basis. Historically, Northern Ireland and Scotland, the other two constituent countries of the UK, have had county police, although both countries now have unified national police services.

== Sweden ==
Until the end of 2014, all of the 21 counties of Sweden had its own County Police Department. In 2015, Sweden merged all local police departments into a single police agency, dividing the country into seven police regions instead.

== United Kingdom ==
- In England, the police are divided into 39 regional forces, providing full services throughout their districts.
- In Wales, the police are divided into 4 regional forces, which all provide full services throughout their districts.
- In Northern Ireland and Scotland, the police are national forces, which provide full services to the full country.

=== Territorial police forces ===
Territorial police forces that have a presence at a regional and county level in England and Wales are:

- Avon and Somerset Constabulary
- Bedfordshire Police
- Cambridgeshire Constabulary
- Cheshire Constabulary
- City of London Police
- Cleveland Police
- Cumbria Constabulary
- Derbyshire Constabulary
- Devon and Cornwall Police
- Dorset Police
- Durham Constabulary
- Dyfed–Powys Police
- Essex Police
- Gloucestershire Constabulary
- Greater Manchester Police
- Gwent Police
- Hampshire Constabulary
- Hertfordshire Constabulary
- Humberside Police
- Kent Police
- Lancashire Constabulary
- Leicestershire Police
- Lincolnshire Police
- Merseyside Police
- Metropolitan Police
- Norfolk Constabulary
- North Wales Police
- Northamptonshire Police
- Northumbria Police
- North Yorkshire Police
- Nottinghamshire Police
- Police Service of Northern Ireland
- Police Scotland
- South Wales Police
- South Yorkshire Police
- Staffordshire Police
- Suffolk Constabulary
- Surrey Police
- Sussex Police
- Thames Valley Police
- Warwickshire Police
- West Mercia Police
- West Midlands Police
- West Yorkshire Police
- Wiltshire Police

== United States ==
In the United States, the powers, duties, and even existence of county police forces vary widely depending on the state, and even on the particular county (parish in Louisiana) within a state. County police forces as autonomous entities are relatively rare and tend to exist only in metropolitan counties. Many states also have a county sheriff's office, which is usually formed on a county basis and traditionally carries out duties related to the functioning of the courts and legal system, such as service of process, executing legal writs, and protection for the local courthouse and its judges. Many state constitutions mandate that the position of sheriff be created, which leads many states to also give sheriffs the duties of a county police to avoid having overlapping departments with similar duties, leaving the sheriff as the exclusive law enforcement agency for a county. Some counties that previously had both a county police department and a sheriff's office have merged the two, leaving the sheriff in command of the unified force, as the sheriff derives his power directly from the constitution; the most prominent example of such a merger is the Las Vegas Metropolitan Police Department which is actually led by the county sheriff despite its name.

County police tend to fall into three broad categories:

- Full-service police departments, which provide the full spectrum of police services to the entire county, irrespective of local communities, and may provide contractual security police services to special districts within the county.
  - Hawaii has only county police; there are no local police.
- Limited service police departments, which provide services to unincorporated areas of the county (and may provide services to some incorporated areas by contract), and usually provide contractual security police services to special districts within the county.
- Restricted service police departments, which provide security police duties to county owned and operated facilities and parks. Some may also perform some road patrol duties on county built and maintained roads, and provide support to municipal police departments in the county.

Note: County detectives, who are maintained in the northeastern states by county attorneys' offices, fall within this category. In the state of Louisiana, a county is known as a parish. In the state of Alaska, a county is known as a borough. The only borough in Alaska to have their own police department is North Slope Borough
