= Sioux =

Indigenous people of North America

Očhéthi Šakówiŋ
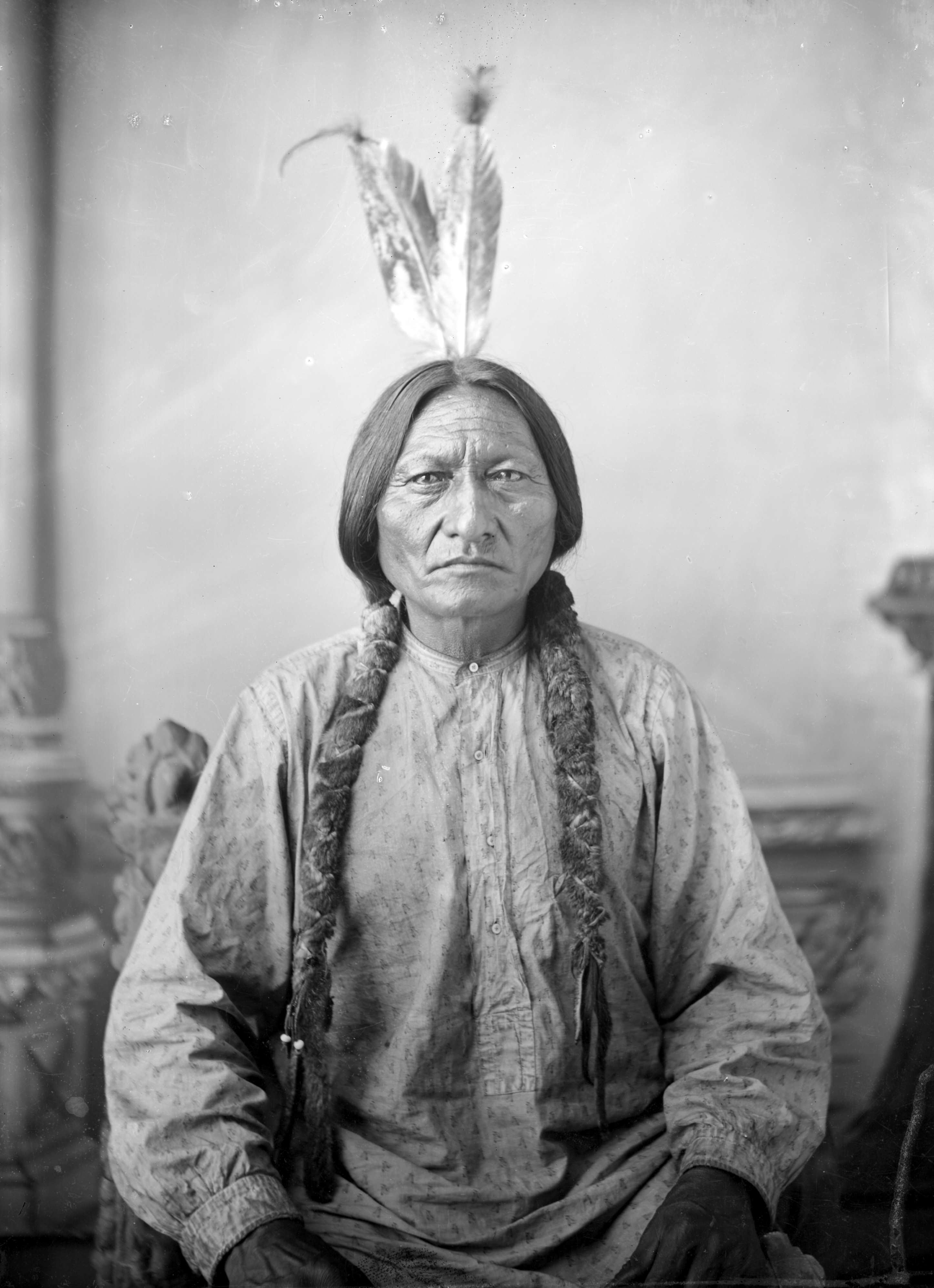
- Sitting Bull, a Hunkpapa Lakota chief and holy man, c. 1831 – December 15, 1890.

Total population
- 170,110 (2010)

Regions with significant populations
- United States: (South Dakota, Minnesota, Nebraska, Montana, North Dakota, Iowa, Wisconsin, Illinois, Wyoming); Canada: (Manitoba, Saskatchewan)

Languages
- Sioux language (Lakota, Western Dakota, Eastern Dakota), English

Religion
- Wocekiye, Christianity (incl. syncretistic forms), traditional religion

Related ethnic groups
- Assiniboine, Dakota, Lakota, Nakoda, and other Siouan-speaking peoples

The Sioux or Oceti Sakowin (/suː/, SOO; Dakota and Lakota: Očhéthi Šakówiŋ [oˈtʃʰeːtʰi ʃaˈkoːwĩ]) are groups of Native American tribes and First Nations people from the Great Plains of North America. The Sioux have two major linguistic divisions: the Dakota and Lakota peoples (translation: 'friend, ally' referring to the alliances between the bands). Collectively, they are the Očhéthi Šakówiŋ, or 'Seven Council Fires'. The term Sioux, an exonym from a French transcription (Nadouessioux) of the Ojibwe term Nadowessi, can refer to any ethnic group within the Great Sioux Nation or to any of the nation's many language dialects.

Before the 17th century, the Santee Dakota (Isáŋyathi: 'Knife', also known as the Eastern Dakota) lived around Lake Superior with territories in present-day northern Minnesota and Wisconsin. They gathered wild rice, hunted woodland animals, and used canoes to fish. The Dakota–Ojibwe War, which lasted throughout the 18th century, pushed the Dakota west into southern Minnesota, where the Western Dakota (Yankton, Yanktonai) and Lakota (Teton) lived. In the 19th century, the Dakota signed land cession treaties with the United States for much of their Minnesota lands. The United States' failure to make treaty payments or provide rations on time led to starvation and the Dakota War of 1862, which resulted in the Dakota's exile from Minnesota. They were forced onto reservations in Nebraska, North Dakota, and South Dakota, and some fled to Canada. After 1870, the Dakota people began to return to Minnesota, creating the present-day reservations in the state. The Yankton and Yanktonai Dakota (Iháŋktȟuŋwaŋ and Iháŋktȟuŋwaŋna; 'Village-at-the-end' and 'Little village-at-the-end'), collectively also called by the endonym Wičhíyena, lived near the Minnesota River before ceding their land and moving to South Dakota in 1858. Despite ceding their lands, their treaty with the US government allowed them to maintain their traditional role in the Očhéthi Šakówiŋ as the caretakers of the Pipestone Quarry, a cultural center for Sioux people. Considered the Western Dakota, they have in the past been erroneously classified as Nakota. Nakota are the Assiniboine and Stoney of Western Canada and Montana.

The Lakota, also called Teton (Thítȟuŋwaŋ; possibly 'dwellers on the prairie'), are the westernmost Sioux, known for their Plains Indians hunting and warrior culture. With the arrival of the horse in the 18th century, the Lakota became a powerful tribe on the Northern Plains by the 1850s. They fought the US Army in the Sioux Wars and defeated the 7th Cavalry Regiment at the Battle of Little Big Horn (1876). The armed conflicts with the US ended with the Wounded Knee Massacre (1890).

Throughout the 20th and 21st centuries, the Dakota and Lakota continued to fight for their treaty rights, including the Wounded Knee incident, Dakota Access Pipeline protests, and the 1980 Supreme Court case United States v. Sioux Nation of Indians, in which the court ruled that the US government had illegally taken tribal lands covered by the Fort Laramie Treaty of 1868 and that the tribe was owed compensation plus interest. As of 2018, this amounted to more than $1 billion; the Sioux have refused the payment, demanding instead the return of the Black Hills. Today, the Sioux maintain many separate tribal governments across several reservations and communities in North Dakota, South Dakota, Nebraska, Minnesota, and Montana in the United States and reserves in Manitoba and Saskatchewan in Canada.

== Etymology ==
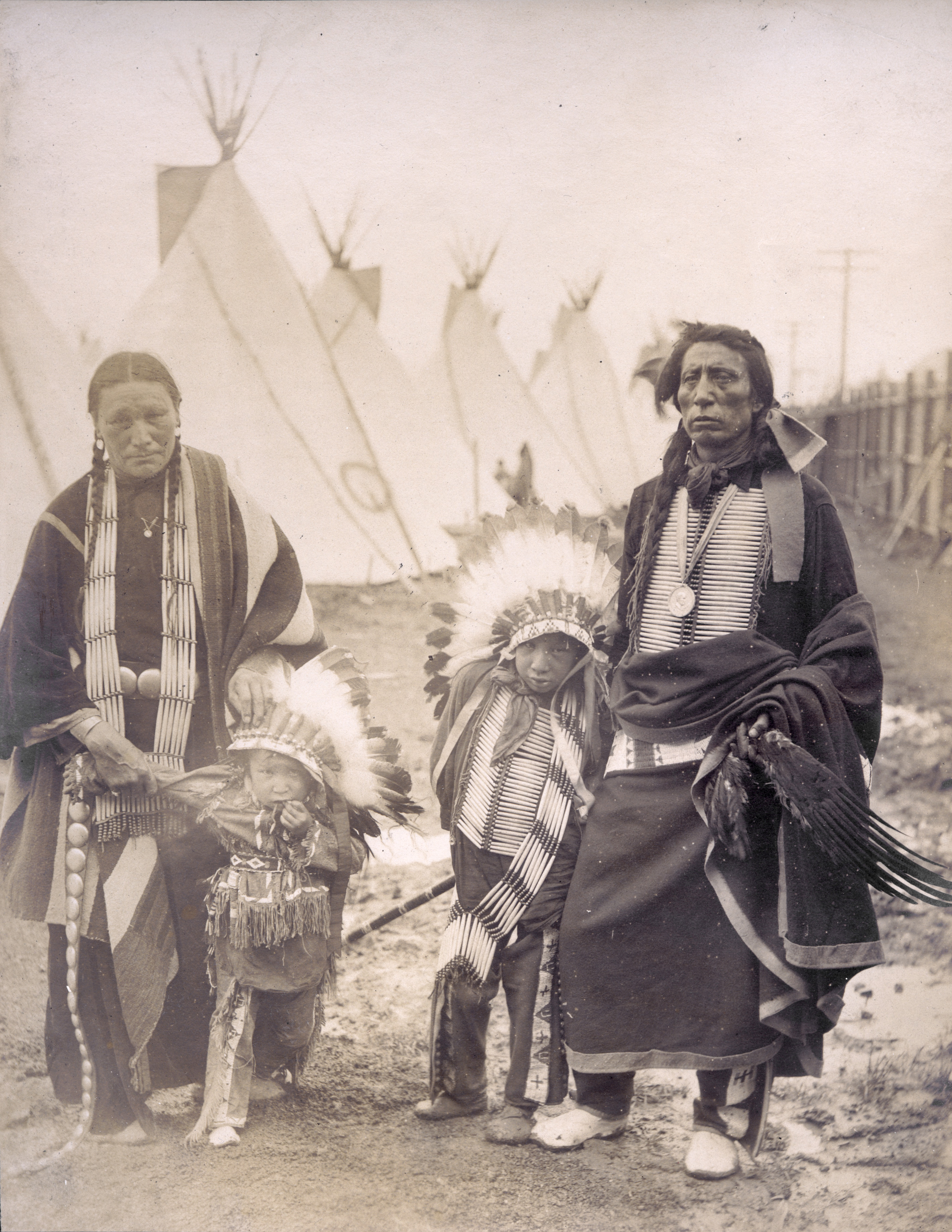
Chief Black Tail Deer and his family at the 1904 World's Fair

The Sioux people refer to their whole nation of people (sometimes called the Great Sioux Nation) as the Očhéthi Šakówiŋ (meaning 'Seven Council Fires'). Each fire symbolizes an oyate (people or nation). Today the seven nations that comprise the Očhéthi Šakówiŋ are:

- Thítȟuŋwaŋ (also known collectively as the Lakota or Teton)
- Bdewákaŋthuŋwaŋ, Waȟpéthuŋwaŋ, Waȟpékhute, and Sisíthuŋwaŋ (also known collectively as the Santee or Eastern Dakota)
- Iháŋkthuŋwaŋ and Iháŋkthuŋwaŋna (also known collectively as the Yankton/Yanktonai or Western Dakota).

They are also referred to as the Lakota or Dakota based on dialect differences. In any of the dialects, Lakota or Dakota translates as 'friend, ally', referring to the alliances between the bands.

The name Sioux was adopted in English by the 1760s from French. It is abbreviated from the French Nadouessioux, first attested by Jean Nicolet in 1640. The name is sometimes said to be derived from Nadowessi (plural Nadowessiwag), an Ojibwe-language exonym for the Sioux meaning 'little snakes' or 'enemy' (compare nadowe 'big snakes', used for the Haudenosaunee). The French pluralized the Ojibwe singular Nadowessi by adding the French plural suffix -oux to form Nadowessioux, which was later shortened to Sioux. The Proto-Algonquian form *na·towe·wa, meaning 'Northern Iroquoian', has reflexes in several daughter languages that refer to a small rattlesnake (massasauga, Sistrurus). An alternative explanation is derivation from an (Algonquian) exonym, na·towe·ssiw (plural na·towe·ssiwak), from a verb *-a·towe· meaning 'to speak a foreign language'. The current Ojibwe term for the Sioux and related groups is Bwaanag (singular Bwaan), meaning 'roasters'. Presumably, this refers to the style of cooking the Sioux used in the past.

In recent times, some of the tribes have formally or informally reclaimed traditional names: the Rosebud Sioux Tribe is also known as the Sičháŋǧu Oyáte, and the Oglala often use the name Oglála Lakȟóta Oyáte, rather than the formal Oglala Sioux Tribe or OST. The alternative English spelling of Ogallala is considered incorrect.

== Culture ==
=== Traditional social structure ===
The traditional social structure of the Očhéthi Šakówiŋ strongly relied on kinship ties that extend beyond human interaction and includes the natural and supernatural worlds. Mitákuye Oyás’iŋ ('all groups are connected') represents a spiritual belief of how human beings should ideally act and relate to other humans, the natural world, the spiritual world, and to the cosmos. The thiyóšpaye represents the political and economic structure of traditional society.

==== Thiyóšpaye (community) kinship ====
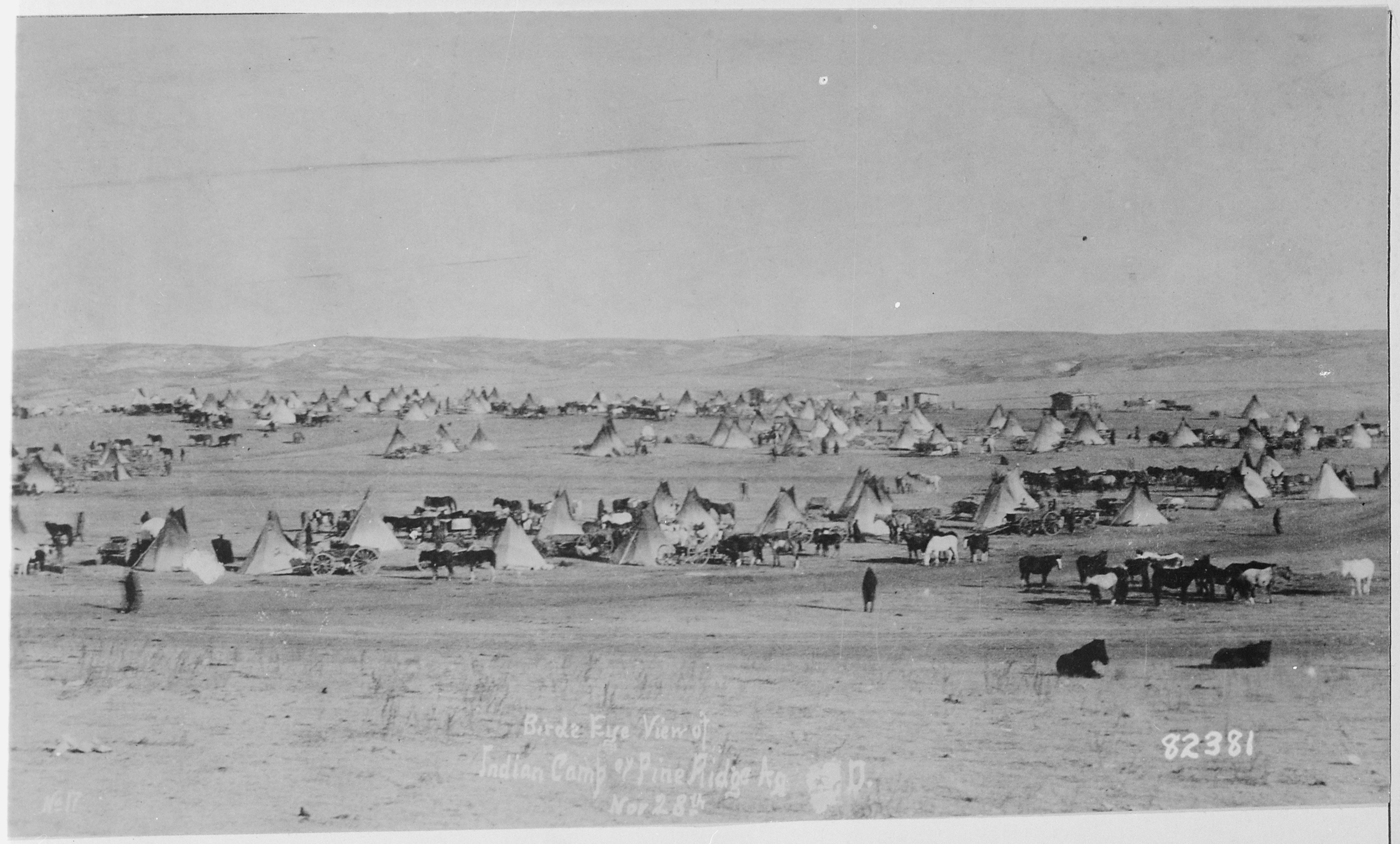
Thiyóšpaye at Pine Ridge, South Dakota, c. 1890

Prior to the arrival of Europeans, the different Očhéthi Šakówiŋ villages (oyáte, 'tribe, nation') consisted of many thiyóšpaye ('camp circles'), which were large extended families united by kinship (thiwáhe, 'immediate family'). Thiyóšpaye varied in size, were led by a leader appointed by an elder council and were nicknamed after a prominent member or memorable event associated with the band. Dakota ethnographer Ella Cara Deloria noted the kinship ties were all-important, they dictated and demanded all phrases of traditional life:

"I can safely say that the ultimate aim of Dakota life, stripped of accessories, was quite simple: one must obey kinship rules; one must be a good relative. No Dakota who participated in that life will dispute that… every other consideration was secondary—property, personal ambition, glory, good times, life itself. Without that aim and constant struggle to attain it, the people would no longer be Dakotas in truth. They would no longer even be human. To be a good Dakota, then, was to be humanized, civilized. And to be civilized was to keep the rules imposed by kinship for achieving civility, good manners, and a sense of responsibility toward every individual dealt with".

During the fur trade era, the thiyóšpaye refused to trade only for economic reasons. Instead the production and trade of goods was regulated by rules of kinship bonds. Personal relationships were pivotal for success: in order for European-Americans to trade with the Očhéthi Šakówiŋ, social bonds had to be created. The most successful fur traders married into the kinship society, which also raised the status of the family of the woman through access to European goods. Outsiders are also adopted into the kinship through the religious Huŋkalowaŋpi ceremony. Early European explorers and missionaries who lived among the Dakota were sometimes adopted into the thiyóšpaye (known as "huŋka relatives"), such as Louis Hennepin who noted, "this help'd me to gain credit among these people". During the later reservation era, districts were often settled by clusters of families from the same thiyóšpaye.

==== Religion ====
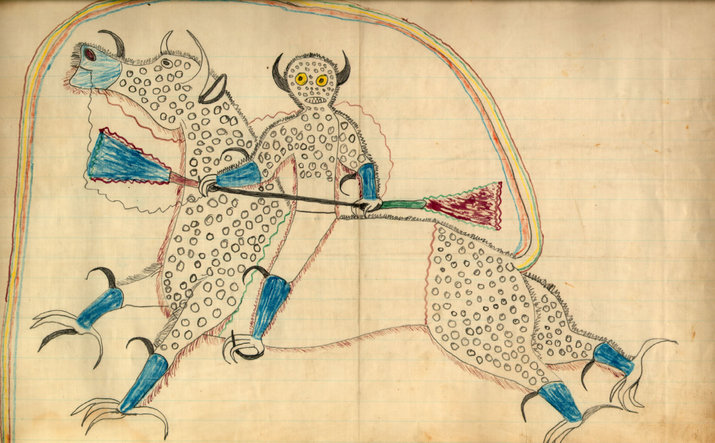
Ledger artwork by Lakota artist Black Hawk representing a heyókȟa, (dreamer of a Wakíŋyaŋ, thunder being), c.1880

The traditional social system extended beyond human interaction into the supernatural realms. It is believed that Wakȟáŋ Tháŋka ('Great Spirit/Great Mystery') created the universe and embodies everything in the universe as one. The preeminent symbol of Sioux religion is the Čhaŋgléska Wakȟaŋ or medicine wheel ('sacred hoop'), which visually represents the concept that everything in the universe is intertwined. The creation stories of the Očhéthi Šakówiŋ describe how the various spirits were formed from Wakȟáŋ Tháŋka. Black Elk describes the relationships with Wakȟáŋ Tháŋka as:

"We should understand well that all things are the works of the Great Spirit. We should know that He is within all things: the trees, the grasses, the rivers, the mountains, and all the four-legged animals, and the winged peoples; and even more important, we should understand that He is also above all these things and peoples. When we do understand all this deeply in our hearts, then we will fear, and love, and know the Great Spirit, and then we will be and act and live as He intends".

Prayer is believed to invoke relationships with one's ancestors or spiritual world. The Lakota word for 'prayer', wočhékiye, means 'to call on for aid, to pray, to claim relationship with'. Their primary cultural prophet is Ptesáŋwiŋ, White Buffalo Calf Woman, who came as an intermediary between Wakȟáŋ Tháŋka Tȟáŋka and humankind to teach them how to be good relatives by introducing the Seven Sacred Rites and the čhaŋnúŋpa (sacred pipe). The seven ceremonies are Inípi (purification lodge), Haŋbléčheyapi (crying for vision), Wiwáŋyaŋg Wačhípi (Sun Dance), Huŋkalowaŋpi (making of relatives), Išnáthi Awíčhalowaŋpi (female puberty ceremony), Tȟápa Waŋkáyeyapi (throwing of the ball) and Wanáǧi Yuhápi (soul keeping). Each part of the sacred pipe (stem, bowl, tobacco, breath, and smoke) is symbolic of the relationships of the natural world, the elements, humans and the spiritual beings that maintain the cycle of the universe.

Dreams can also be a means of establishing relationships with spirits and are important to the Očhéthi Šakówiŋ. One can gain supernatural powers through dreams. Dreaming of the Wakíŋyaŋ (thunder beings) is believed to involuntarily make someone a Heyókȟa, a sacred clown. Black Elk, a famous Heyókȟa said: "Only those who have had visions of the thunder beings of the west can act as heyokas. They have sacred power and they share some of this with all the people, but they do it through funny actions".

==== Governance ====
Historical leadership organization

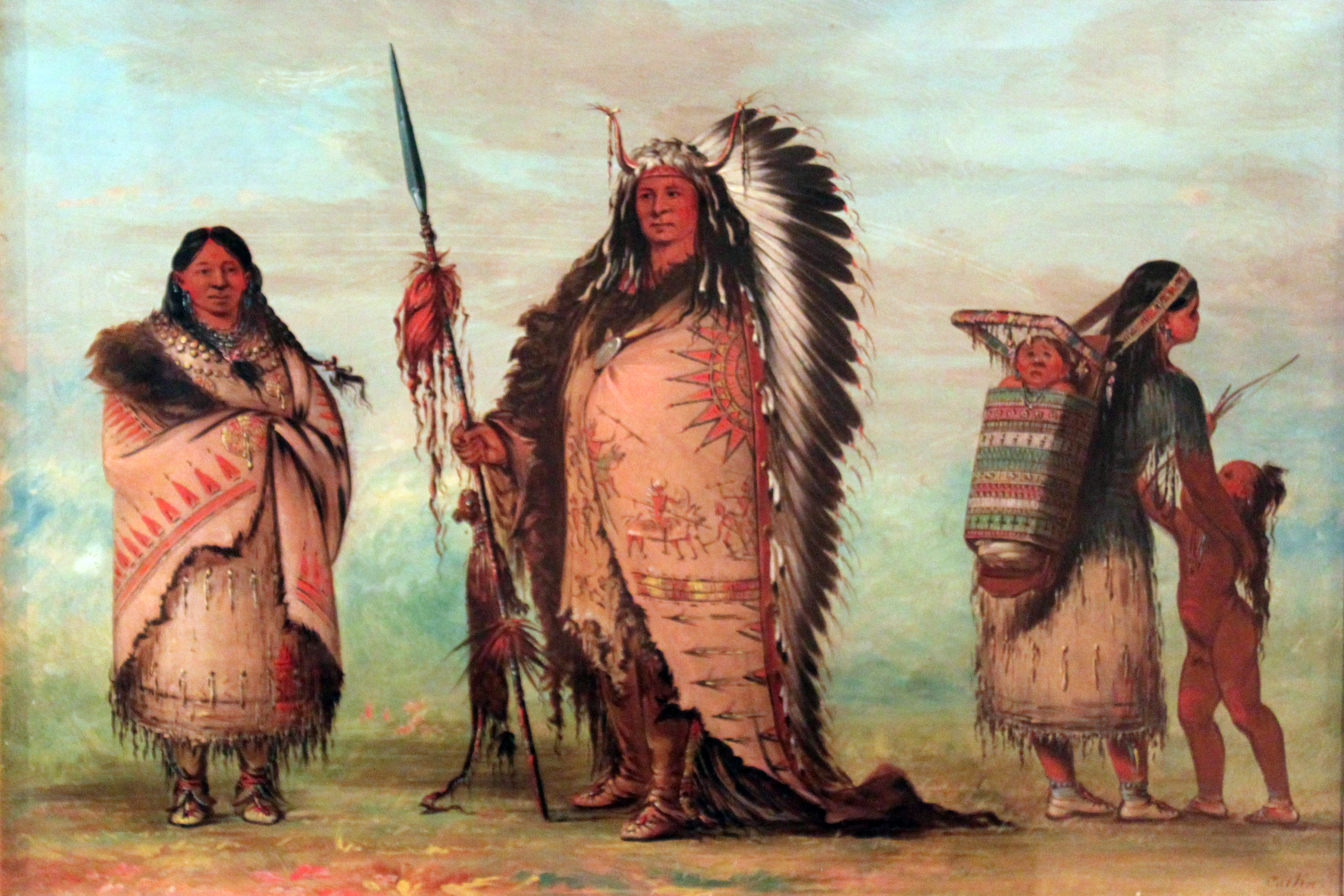
Sioux chief with family, by George Catlin, 1854

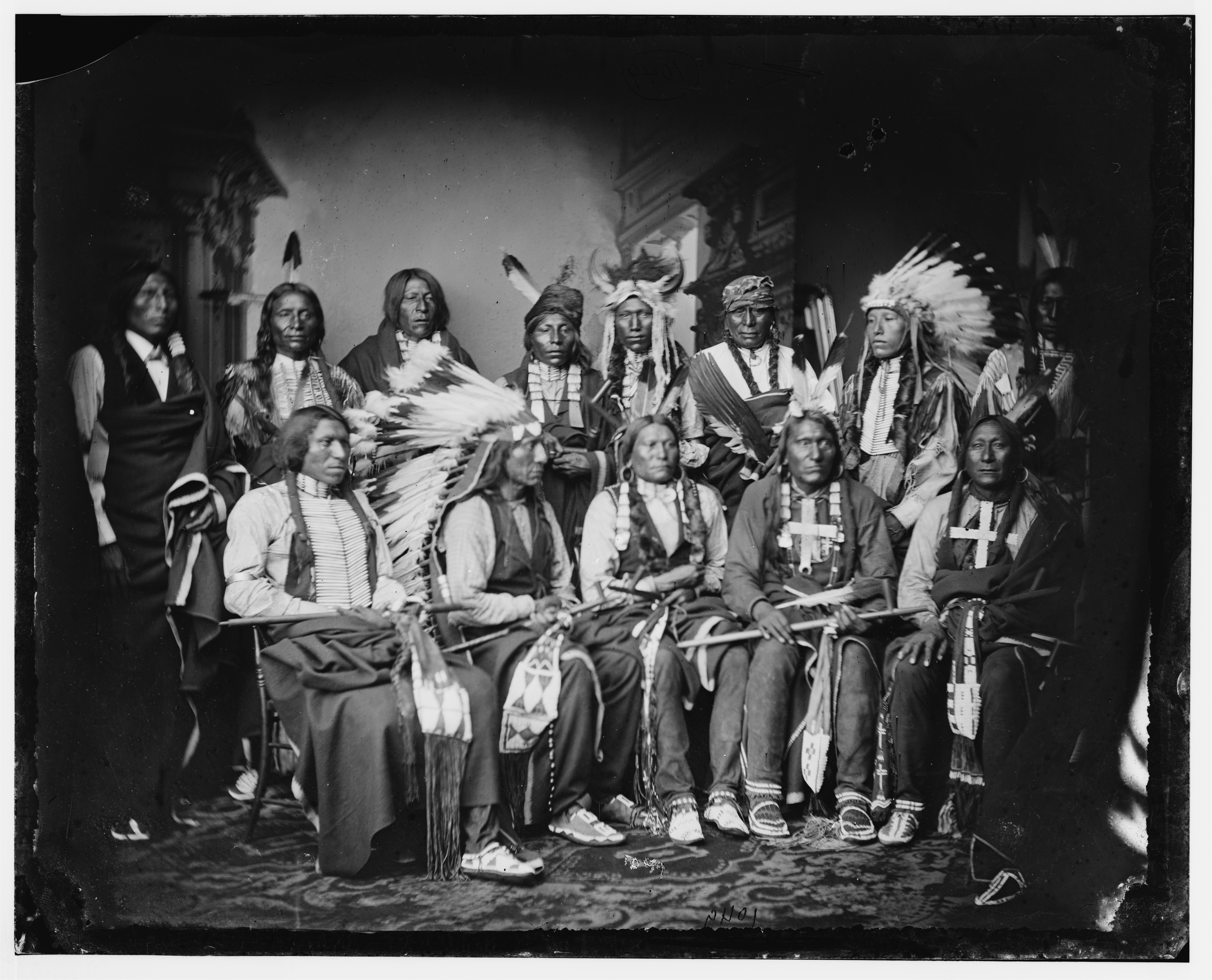
Chief Red Cloud and other Lakota leaders, c. 1865–1880

The thiyóšpaye of the Očhéthi Šakówiŋ assembled each summer to hold council, renew kinships, decide tribal matters, and participate in the Sun Dance. The seven divisions selected four leaders known as Wičháša Yatápika from among the leaders of each division. Being one of the four leaders was considered the highest honor for a leader; however, the annual gathering meant the majority of tribal administration was cared for by the usual leaders of each division. The last meeting of the Seven Council Fires was in 1850. The historical political organization was based on individual participation and the cooperation of many to sustain the tribe's way of life. Leaders were chosen based upon noble birth and demonstrations of chiefly virtues, such as bravery, fortitude, generosity, and wisdom.

- Political leaders were members of the Načá Omníčiye society and decided matters of tribal hunts, camp movements, whether to make war or peace with their neighbors, or any other community action.
- Societies were similar to fraternities; men joined to raise their position in the tribe. Societies were composed of smaller clans and varied in number among the seven divisions. There were two types of societies: Akíčhita, for the younger men, and Načá, for elders and former leaders.
- Akíčhita (Soldier) societies existed to train warriors, hunters, and to police the community. There were many smaller Akíčhita societies, including the Kit-Fox, Strong Heart, Elk, and so on.
- Leaders in the Načá societies, per Načá Omníčiye, were the tribal elders and leaders. They elected seven to ten men, depending on the division, each referred to as Wičháša Itȟáŋčhaŋ ("chief man"). Each Wičháša Itȟáŋčhaŋ interpreted and enforced the decisions of the Načá.
- The Wičháša Itȟáŋčhaŋ elected two to four shirt-wearers, who were the voice of the society. They settled quarrels among families and also foreign nations. Shirt-wearers were often young men from families with hereditary claims of leadership. However, men with obscure parents who displayed outstanding leadership skills and had earned the respect of the community might also be elected. Crazy Horse is an example of a common-born shirt-wearer".
- A Wakíčhuŋza 'pipe-holder' ranked below the "Shirt Wearers". The pipe-holders regulated peace ceremonies, selected camp locations, and supervised the Akíčhita societies during buffalo hunts.

==== Gender roles ====
Within the Sioux tribes, there were defined gender roles. The men in the village were tasked as the hunters, traveling outside the village. The women within the village were in charge of making clothing and similar articles while also taking care of, and owning, the house. However, even with these roles, both men and women held power in decision-making tasks and sexual preferences were flexible and allowed. The term wíŋkte refers to men who partook in traditional feminine duties while the term witkówiŋ ('crazy woman') was used for women who rejected their roles as either mother or wife to be a prostitute.

=== Funeral practices ===
==== Traditional funeral practices ====
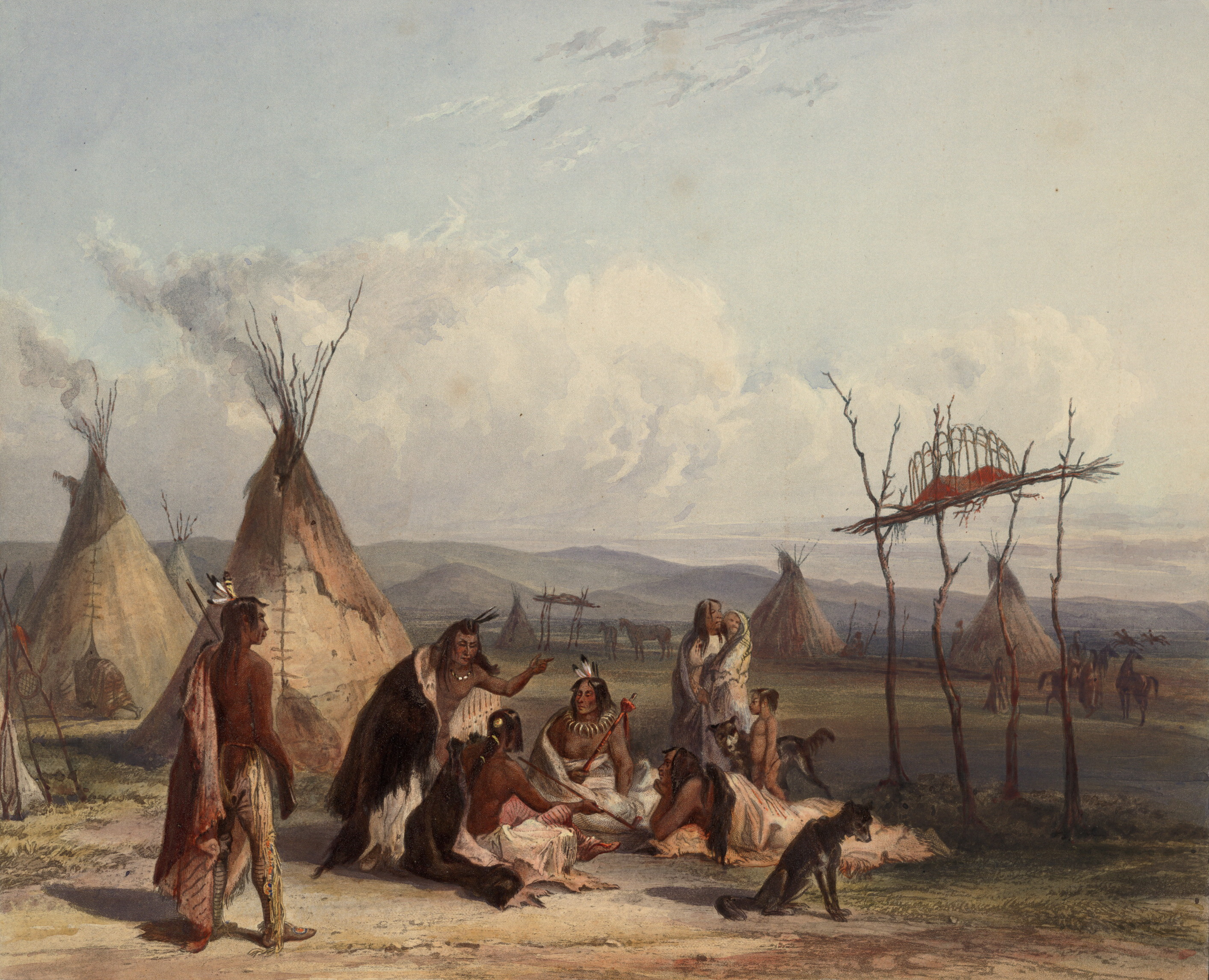
Funeral scaffold of a Sioux chief (Karl Bodmer)

It is a common belief amongst Siouan communities that the spirit of the deceased travels to an afterlife. In traditional beliefs, this spiritual journey was believed to start once funeral proceedings were complete and spanned over a course of four days. Mourning family and friends took part in that four-day wake in order to accompany the spirit to its resting place. In the past, bodies were not embalmed but put up on a burial tree or scaffold for one year before a ground burial. A platform to rest the body was put up on trees or, alternately, placed on four upright poles to elevate the body from the ground. The bodies were securely wrapped in blankets and cloths, along with many of the deceased personal belongings and were always placed with their head pointed towards the south. Mourning individuals spoke to the body and offer food as if it were still alive. This practice, along with the Ghost Dance, helped individuals mourn and connect the spirits of the deceased with those who were alive. The only time a body was buried in the ground right after their death was if the individual was murdered: the deceased were placed in the ground with their heads towards the south, while faced down along with a piece of fat in their mouth.

==== Contemporary funeral practices ====
According to Pat Janis, director of the Oglala Sioux Tribe's Burial Assistance Program, funeral practices of communities today are often a mix of traditions and contemporary Christian practices. While tree burials and scaffold burials are not practiced anymore, it is also now rare to see families observe a four-day wake period. Instead, the families opt for one- or two-day wake periods which include a funeral feast for all the community. Added to the contemporary funeral practices, it is common to see prayers conducted by a medicine man along with traditional songs often sung with a drum. One member of the family is also required to be present next to the body at all times until the burial. Gifts are placed within the casket to aid with the journey into the afterworld, which is still believed to take up to four days after death.

== History ==
=== Creation stories ===
There are a number of creation stories within the tribes. One widely noted creation story for Dakota people is at Bdóte, the area where the Minnesota and Mississippi Rivers meet. Lakota people relate to Wind Cave in South Dakota as their site of emergence.

=== Ancestral Sioux ===
The ancestral Sioux most likely lived in the Central Mississippi Valley region and later in Minnesota for at least two or three thousand years. The ancestors of the Sioux arrived in the northwoods of central Minnesota and northwestern Wisconsin from the Central Mississippi River shortly before 800 AD. Archaeologists refer to them as the Woodland Blackduck-Kathio-Clam River Continuum. Around 1300 AD, they adopted the characteristics of a northern tribal society and became known as the Seven Council Fires.

=== First contact with Europeans ===
The Dakota are first recorded to have resided at the source of the Mississippi River and the Great Lakes during the seventeenth century. They were dispersed west in 1659 due to warfare with the Haudenosaunee. During the 1600s, the Lakota began their expansion westward into the Plains, taking with them the bulk of people of the Očhéthi Šakówiŋ. By 1700 the Dakota were living in Wisconsin and Minnesota. As the Sioux nation began expanding with access to horses, the Dakota were put in a weakened position to defend the eastern border: new diseases (smallpox and malaria) and increased intertribal warfare (between the migration of tribes fleeing the Haudenosaunee into their territory of present-day Wisconsin) put a strain on their ability to maintain their territory. As a result, their population in the Mississippi valley is believed to have declined by one-third between 1680 and 1805.

=== French trade and intertribal warfare ===
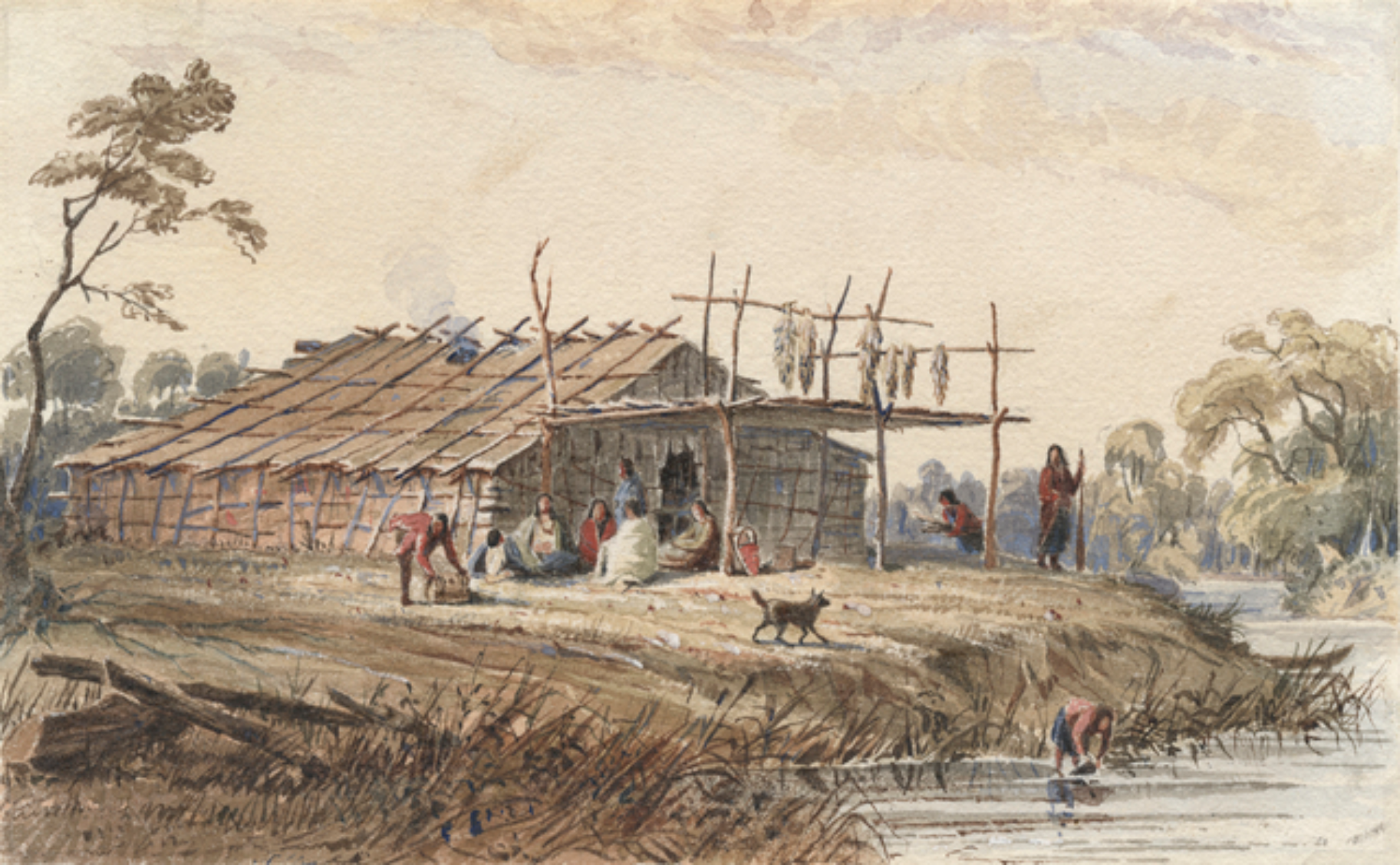
Permanent Residence, Santee Dakota, by Seth Eastman 1846

Late in the 17th century, the Dakota entered into an alliance with French merchants. The French were trying to gain advantage in the struggle for the North American fur trade against the English, who had recently established the Hudson's Bay Company. Algonquian peoples such as the Ojibwe, Potawatomi and Odawa were among the first to trade with the French as they migrated into the Great Lakes region. Upon their arrival, Dakota were in an economic alliance with them until the Dakota were able to trade directly for European goods with the French. The first recorded encounter between the Sioux and the French occurred when Radisson and Groseilliers reached what is now Wisconsin during the winter of 1659–60. Later visiting French traders and missionaries included Claude-Jean Allouez, Daniel Greysolon Duluth, and Pierre-Charles Le Sueur who wintered with Dakota bands in early 1700.

The Dakota began to resent the Ojibwe trading with the hereditary enemies of the Sioux, the Cree and Assiniboine. Tensions rose in the 1720s into a prolonged war in 1736. The Dakota lost their traditional lands around Leech Lake and Mille Lacs as they were forced south along the Mississippi River and St. Croix River Valley as a result of the battles. These intertribal conflicts also made it dangerous for European fur traders: whichever side they traded with, they were viewed as enemies from the other. For example, in 1736 a group of Sioux killed Jean Baptiste de La Vérendrye and twenty other men on an island in Lake of the Woods for such reasons. However, trade with the French continued until the French gave up North America in 1763. Europeans repeatedly tried to make truce between the warring tribes in order to protect their interests.

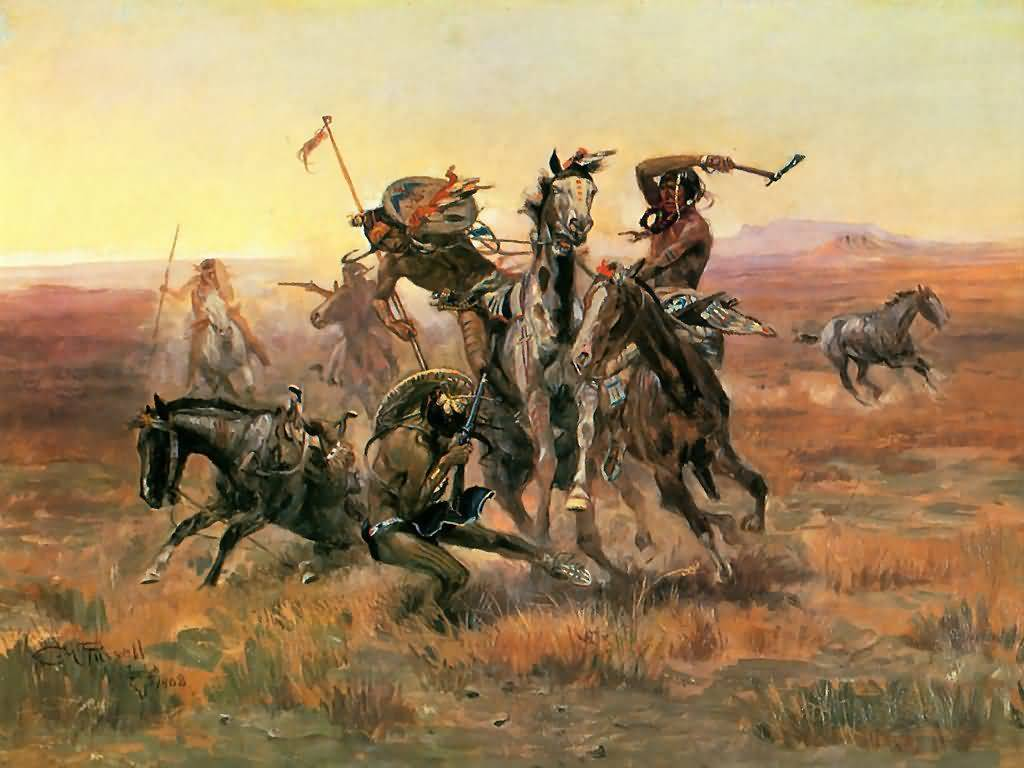
War on the plains. Blackfoot fighting the Sioux. Painting by Charles Marion Russell

One of the larger battles between the Dakota and Ojibwe took place in 1770 fought at the Dalles of the St. Croix. According to William Whipple Warren, a Métis historian, the fighting began when the Meskwaki (Fox) engaged the Ojibwe (their hereditary enemies) around St. Croix Falls. The Sioux were the former enemies of the Meskwaki and were enlisted to make a joint attack against the Ojibwe. The Meskwaki were first to engage with the large Ojibwe war party led by Waubojeeg: the Meskwaki allegedly boasted to the Dakota to hold back as they would quickly destroy their enemies. When the Dakota joined the battle, they had the upper hand until Sandy Lake Ojibwe reinforcements arrived. The Dakota were driven back and Warren states: "Many were driven over the rocks into the boiling floods below, there to find a watery grave. Others, in attempting to jump into their narrow wooden canoes, were capsized into the rapids". While Dakota and Ojibwe suffered heavy losses, the Meskwaki were left with the most dead and forced to join their relatives, the Sauk people. The victory for the Ojibwe secured control of the Upper St. Croix and created an informal boundary between the Dakota and Ojibwe around the mouth of the Snake River.

As the Lakota entered the prairies, they adopted many of the customs of the neighboring Plains tribes, creating new cultural patterns based on the horse and fur trade. Meanwhile, the Dakota retained many of their Woodlands features. By 1803, the three divisions of the Sioux (Western/Eastern Dakota and Lakota) were established in their different environments and had developed their own distinctive lifeways. However, due to the prevalent cultural concept of thiyóšpaye (community), the three divisions maintained strong ties throughout the changing times to present day.

=== Treaties and reservation period beginnings ===
In 1805, the Dakota signed their first treaty with the American government. Zebulon Pike negotiated for 100,000 acres of land at the confluence of the St. Croix River about what now is Hastings, Minnesota and the confluence of the Minnesota River and Mississippi River about what now is Saint Paul, Minnesota. The Americans wanted to establish military outposts and the Dakota wanted a new source of trading. An American military post was not established at the confluence of the St. Croix with the Mississippi, but Fort Snelling was established in 1819 along the Minnesota and Mississippi rivers. In return, Dakota were promised the ability to "pass and repass, hunt, or make other uses of the said districts as they have formerly done".

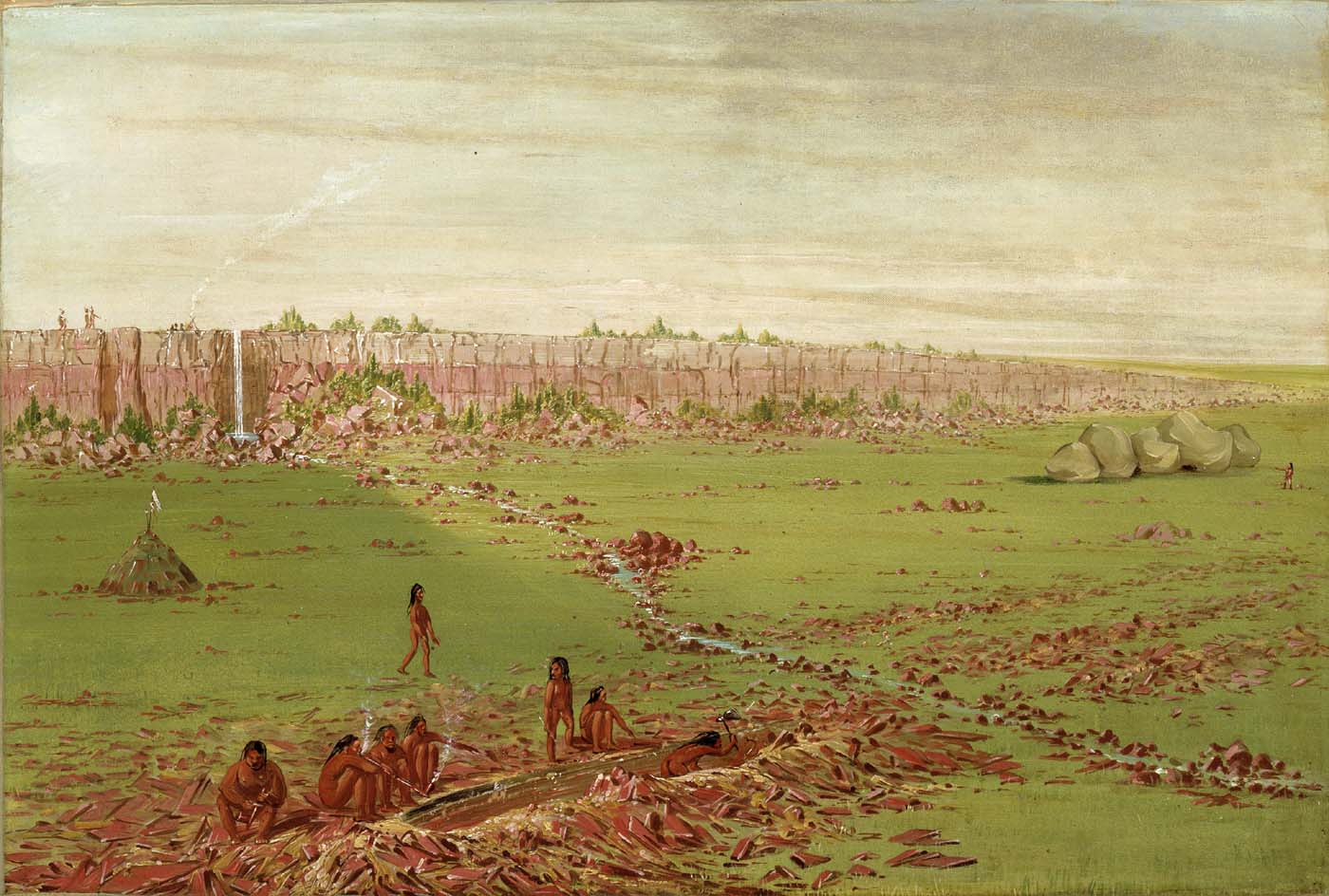
Yankton Pipestone Quarries as seen by George Catlin in 1836

In an attempt to stop intertribal warfare and to better able to negotiate with tribes, the American government signed the 1825 Treaty of Prairie du Chien with the Dakota, Ojibwe, Menominee, Ho-Chunk, Sac and Fox, Iowa, Potawatomi, and Odawa tribes. In the 1830 Treaty of Prairie de Chien, the Western Dakota (Yankton, Yanktonai) ceded their lands along the Des Moines river to the American government. Living in what is now southeastern South Dakota, the leaders of the Western Dakota signed the Treaty of April 19, 1858, which created the Yankton Sioux Reservation. Pressured by the ongoing arrival of Europeans, Yankton chief Struck by the Ree told his people, "The white men are coming in like maggots. It is useless to resist them. They are many more than we are. We could not hope to stop them. Many of our brave warriors would be killed, our women and children left in sorrow, and still we would not stop them. We must accept it, get the best terms we can get and try to adopt their ways." Despite ceding their lands, the treaty allowed the Western Dakota to maintain their traditional role in the Očhéthi Šakówiŋ as the caretakers of the Pipestone Quarry, which is the cultural center of the Sioux people.

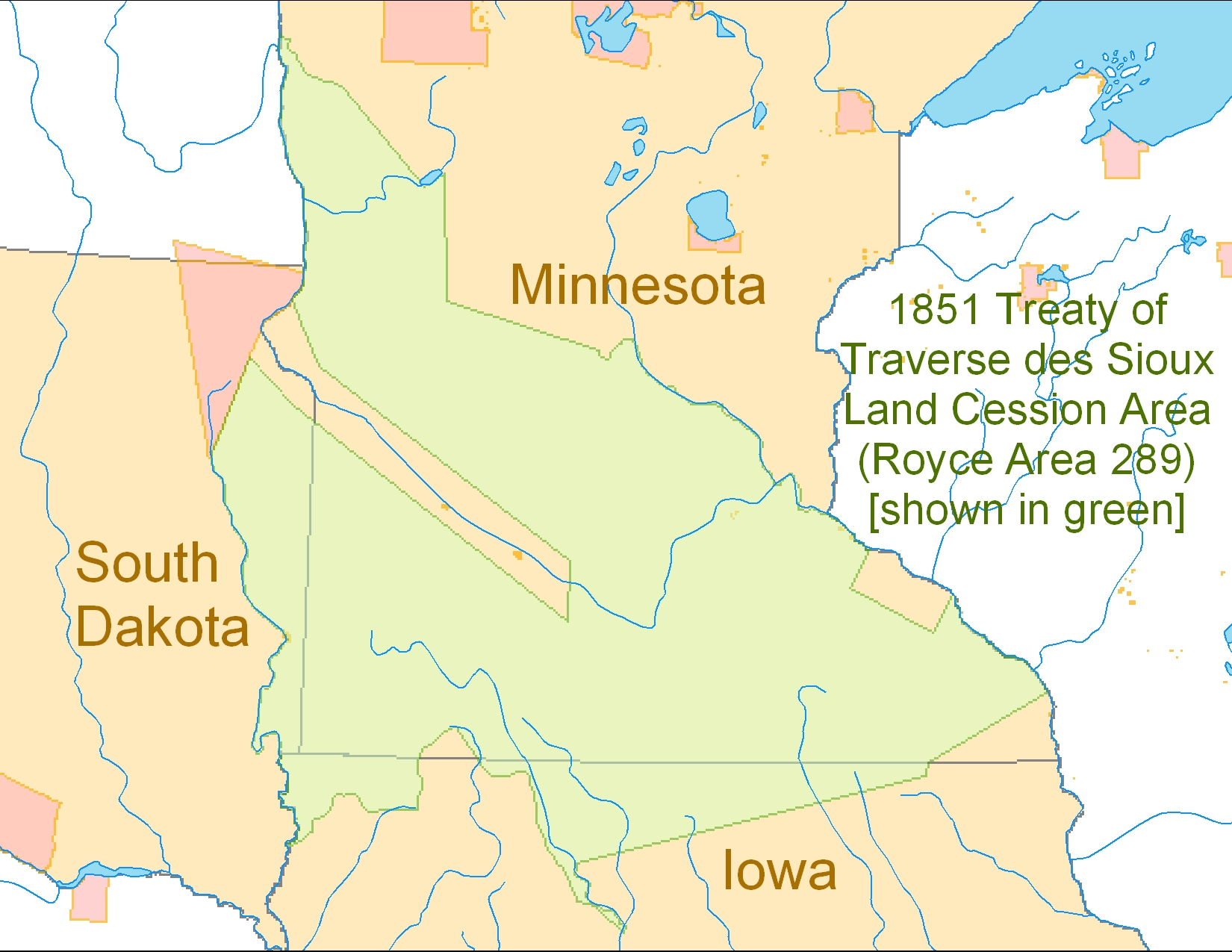
Map showing the boundaries of the 1851 Treaty of Traverse des Sioux land cession area (Royce Area 289)

With the creation of Minnesota Territory by the US in 1849, the Eastern Dakota (Sisseton, Wahpeton, Mdewakanton, and Wahpekute) people were pressured to cede more of their land. The reservation period for them began in 1851 with the signing of the Treaty of Mendota and the Treaty of Traverse des Sioux. The Treaty of Mendota was signed near Pilot Knob on the south bank of the Minnesota River and within sight of Fort Snelling. The treaty stipulated that the Mdewakanton and Wahpekute bands were to receive US$1,410,000 in return for relocating to the Lower Sioux Agency on the Minnesota River near present-day Morton, Minnesota along with giving up their rights to a significant portion of southern Minnesota. In the Treaty of Traverse des Sioux, the Sisseton and Wahpeton bands of the Dakota ceded 21 million acres for $1,665,000, or about 7.5 cents an acre. However, the American government kept more than 80% of the funds with only the interest (5% for 50 years) being paid to the Dakota.

The US set aside two reservations for the Sioux along the Minnesota River, each about 20 miles (30 km) wide and 70 miles (110 km) long. Later the government declared these were intended to be temporary, in an effort to force the Sioux out of Minnesota. The Upper Sioux Agency for the Sisseton and Wahpeton bands was established near Granite Falls, Minnesota, while the Lower Sioux Agency for the Mdewakanton and Wahpekute bands was established about thirty miles downstream near what developed as Redwood Falls, Minnesota. The Upper Sioux were not satisfied with their reservation because of low food supplies, but as it included several of their old villages, they agreed to stay. The Lower Sioux were displaced from their traditional woodlands and were dissatisfied with their new territory of mostly prairie.

The US intended the treaties to encourage the Sioux to convert from their nomadic hunting lifestyle into more European-American settled farming, offering them compensation in the transition. By 1858, the Dakota only had a small strip of land along the Minnesota River, with no access to their traditional hunting grounds. They had to rely on treaty payments for their survival, which were often late. The forced change in lifestyle and the much lower than expected payments from the federal government caused economic suffering and increased social tensions within the tribes. By 1862, many Dakota were starving and tensions erupted in the Dakota War of 1862.

=== Dakota War of 1862 and the Dakota diaspora ===
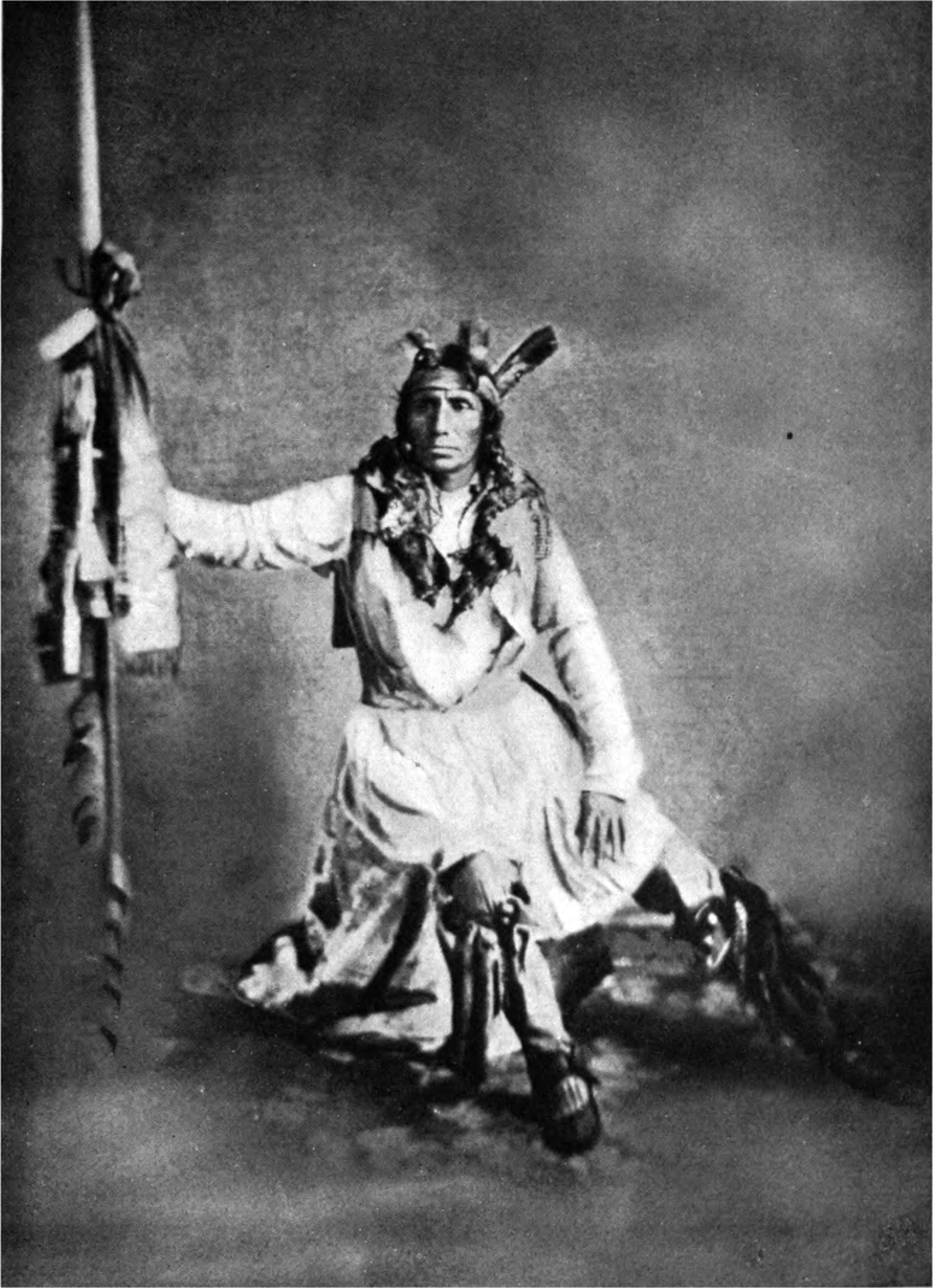
Little Crow, leader of the Mdewakanton during the 1862 Dakota War, c. 1863

By 1862, shortly after a failed crop the year before and a winter starvation, the federal payment was late. The local traders refused to issue any credit to the Dakota. One trader, Andrew Myrick, went so far as to say, "If they're hungry, let them eat grass."

On August 16, 1862, the treaty payments to the eastern Dakota arrived in Saint Paul, Minnesota, and were brought to Fort Ridgely the next day. However, they arrived too late to prevent the war. On August 17, 1862, the Dakota War began when a few Santee men murdered a white farmer and most of his family. They inspired further attacks on white settlements along the Minnesota River. On August 18, 1862, Little Crow of the Mdewakanton band led a group that attacked the Lower Sioux Agency (or Redwood Agency) and trading post located there. Later, settlers found Myrick among the dead with his mouth stuffed full of grass. Many of the upper Dakota (Sisseton and Wahpeton) wanted no part in the attacks with the majority of the 4,000 members of the Sisseton and Wahpeton opposed to the war. Thus their bands did not participate in the early killings. Historian Mary Wingerd has stated that it is "a complete myth that all the Dakota people went to war against the United States" and that it was rather "a faction that went on the offensive".

Most of Little Crow's men surrendered shortly after the Battle of Wood Lake at Camp Release on September 26, 1862. Little Crow was forced to retreat sometime in September 1862. He stayed briefly in Canada but soon returned to the western Minnesota. He was killed on July 3, 1863, near Hutchinson, Minnesota while gathering raspberries with his teenage son. The pair had wandered onto the land of a settler Nathan Lamson, who shot at them to collect bounties. Once it was discovered that the body was of Little Crow, his skull and scalp were put on display by the Minnesota Historical Society in Saint Paul, Minnesota. The State held the trophies until 1971 when it returned the remains to Little Crow's grandson. For killing Little Crow the state increased the bounty to $500 when it paid Lamson.

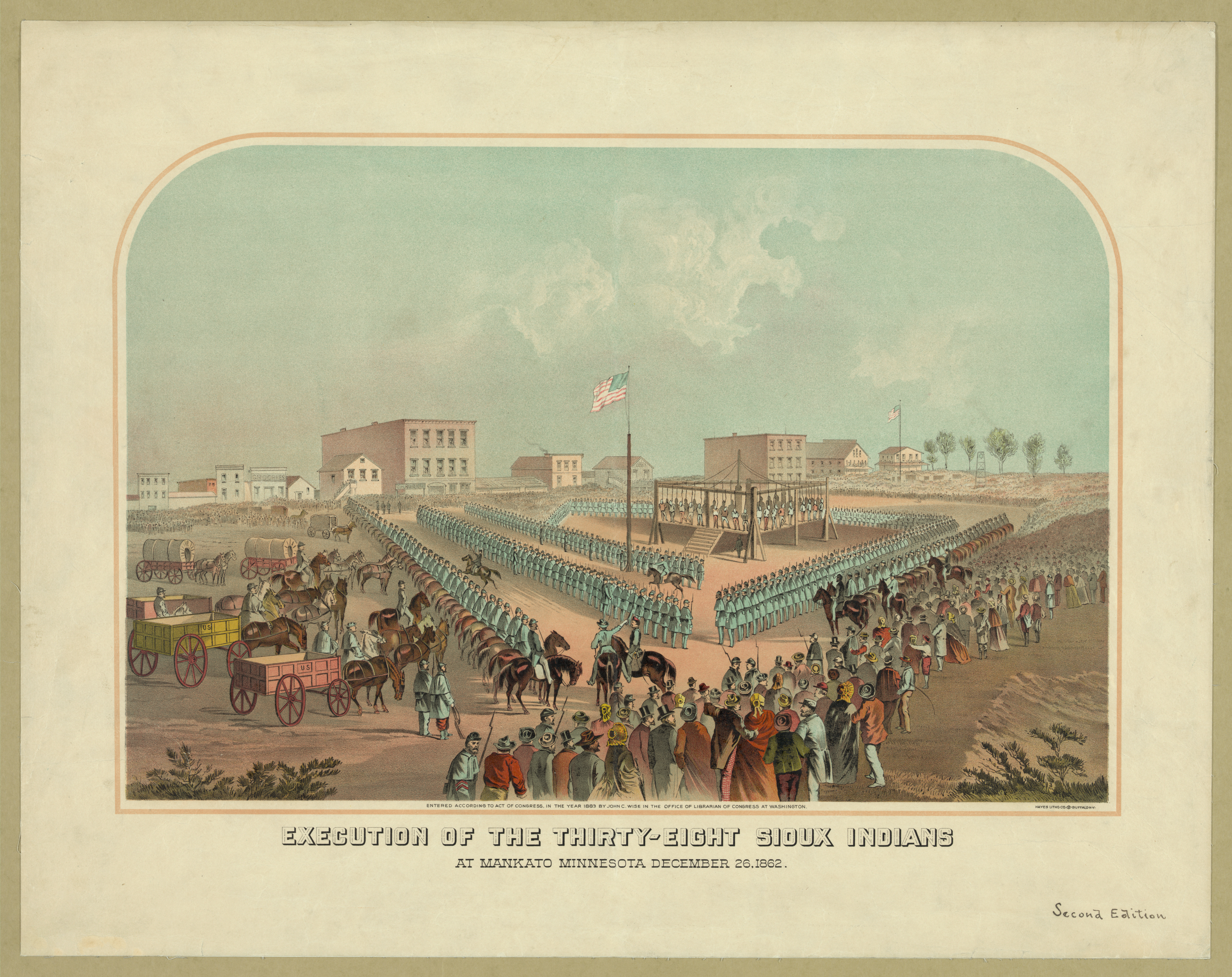
Drawing of the mass hanging of Dakota in Mankato, Minnesota

On November 5, 1862, a military tribunal found 303 mostly Mdewakanton tribesmen guilty of rape, murder and atrocities of hundreds of Minnesota settlers. They were sentenced to be hanged. The men had no attorneys or defense witnesses, and many were convicted in less than five minutes. President Abraham Lincoln commuted the death sentences of 284 of the warriors, while signing off on the hanging of 38 Santee men on December 26, 1862, in Mankato, Minnesota. It was the largest mass-execution in US history, on US soil. The men remanded by order of President Lincoln were sent to a prison in Iowa, where more than half died.

Afterwards, the US Congress annulled all treaty agreements with the eastern Dakota and expelled the eastern Dakota with the Forfeiture Act of February 16, 1863, meaning all lands held by the eastern Dakota, and all annuities due to them, were forfeited to the US government. During and after the hostilities, the majority of eastern Dakota fled Minnesota for the Dakota territory or Canada. Some settled in the James River Valley in a short-lived reservation before being forced to move to Crow Creek Reservation on the east bank of the Missouri River. There were as few as 50 eastern Dakota left in Minnesota by 1867. Many had fled to the Santee Sioux Reservation in Nebraska (created 1863), the Flandreau Reservation (created 1869 from members who left the Santee Reservation), the Lake Traverse and Spirit Lake Reservations (both created 1867). Those who fled to Canada throughout the 1870s now have descendants residing on nine small Dakota Reserves, five of which are located in Manitoba (Sioux Valley, Dakota Plain, Dakota Tipi, Birdtail Creek, and Canupawakpa Dakota) and the remaining four (Standing Buffalo, White Cap, Round Plain [wahpeton], and Wood Mountain) in Saskatchewan. A few Dakota joined the Yanktonai and moved further west to join with the Lakota bands to continue their struggle against the United States military, later settling on the Fort Peck Reservation in Montana.

=== Westward expansion of the Lakota ===
Prior to the 1650s, the Thítȟuŋwaŋ division of the Očhéthi Šakówiŋ known as the Lakota was noted as being located east of the Red River, and living on the fringes of the prairies and woods of the prairies of southern Minnesota and the eastern Dakotas by at least 1680. According to Baptiste Good's winter count, the Lakota had horses by 1700. While the Dakota continued a subsistence cycle of corn, wild rice and hunting woodland animals, the Lakota increasingly became reliant on bison for meat and its by-products (housing, clothing, tools) as they expanded their territory westward with the arrival of the horse. After their adoption of horse culture, Lakota society centered on the buffalo hunt on horseback.

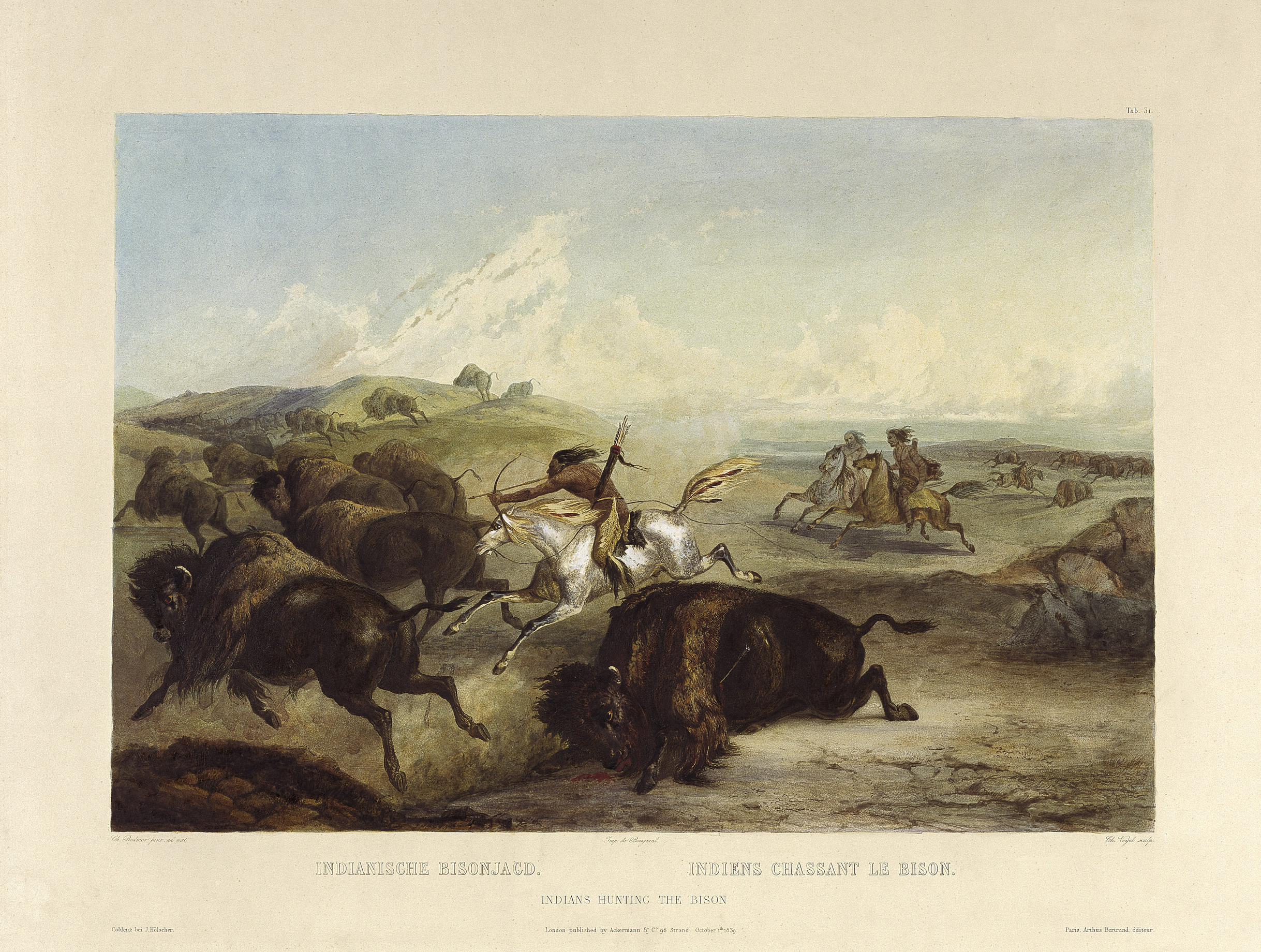
Illustration of Indians hunting the bison by Karl Bodmer

By the 19th century, the typical year of the Lakota was a communal buffalo hunt as early in spring as their horses had recovered from the rigors of the winter. In June and July, the scattered bands of the tribes gathered together into large encampments, which included ceremonies such as the Sun Dance. These gatherings afforded leaders to meet to make political decisions, plan movements, arbitrate disputes, and organize and launch raiding expeditions or war parties. In the fall, people split into smaller bands to facilitate hunting to procure meat for the long winter. Between the fall hunt and the onset of winter was a time when Lakota warriors could undertake raiding and warfare. With the coming of winter snows, the Lakota settled into winter camps, where activities of the season, ceremonies and dances as well as trying to ensure adequate winter feed for their horses.

They began to dominate the prairies east of the Missouri river by the 1720s. At the same time, the Lakota branch split into two major sects, the Saône who moved to the Lake Traverse area on the South Dakota–North Dakota–Minnesota border, and the Oglála-Sičháŋǧu who occupied the James River valley. However, by about 1750 the Saône had moved to the east bank of the Missouri River, followed 10 years later by the Oglála and Sičháŋǧu (Brulé). By 1750, they had crossed the Missouri River and encountered Lewis and Clark in 1804. Initial United States contact with the Lakota during the Lewis and Clark Expedition of 1804–1806 was marked by a standoff. Lakota bands refused to allow the explorers to continue upstream, and the expedition prepared for battle, which never came. In 1776, the Lakota defeated the Cheyenne for the Black Hills, who had earlier taken the region from the Kiowa. The Cheyenne then moved west to the Powder River country, and the Lakota made the Black Hills their home.

As their territory expanded, so did the number of rival groups they encountered. They secured an alliance with the Northern Cheyenne and Northern Arapaho by the 1820s as intertribal warfare on the plains increased amongst the tribes for access to the dwindling population of buffalo. The alliance fought the Mandan, Hidatsa and Arikara for control of the Missouri River in North Dakota. By the 1840s, their territory expanded to the Powder River country in Montana, in which they fought with the Crow. Their victories over these tribes during this time period were aided by the fact those tribes were decimated by European diseases. Most of the Mandan, Hidatsa and Arikara were killed by smallpox and almost half the population of the Crow were killed due to smallpox, cholera and other diseases. In 1843, the southern Lakotas attacked Pawnee Chief Blue Coat's village near the Loup in Nebraska, killing many and burning half of the earth lodges, and 30 years later, the Lakota again inflicted a blow so severe on the Pawnee during the Massacre Canyon battle near Republican River. By the 1850s, the Lakota were known as the most powerful tribe on the Plains.

=== Fort Laramie Treaty of 1851 ===
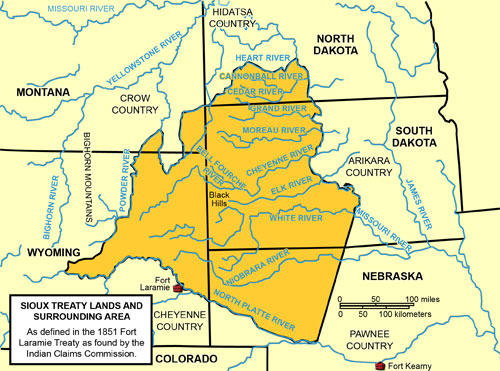
The Lands of the 1851 Ft. Laramie Treaty

The Fort Laramie Treaty of 1851 was signed on September 17, 1851, between US treaty commissioners and representatives of the Cheyenne, Sioux, Arapaho, Crow, Assiniboine, Mandan, Hidatsa, and Arikara Nations. The treaty was an agreement between nine more or less independent parties. The treaty set forth traditional territorial claims of the tribes as among themselves. The United States acknowledged that all the land covered by the treaty was Indian territory and did not claim any part of it. The boundaries agreed to in the Fort Laramie treaty of 1851 were used to settle a number of claims cases in the 20th century. The tribes guaranteed safe passage for settlers on the Oregon Trail and allowed roads and forts to be built in their territories in return for promises of an annuity in the amount of fifty thousand dollars for fifty years. The treaty should also "make an effective and lasting peace" among the eight tribes, each of them often at odds with a number of the others.

The treaty was broken almost immediately after its inception by the Lakota and Cheyenne attacking the Crow over the next two years. In 1858, the failure of the United States to prevent the mass immigration of miners and settlers into Colorado during the Pike's Peak Gold Rush, also did not help matters. They took over Indian lands in order to mine them, "against the protests of the Indians," and founded towns, started farms, and improved roads. Such immigrants competed with the tribes for game and water, straining limited resources and resulting in conflicts with the emigrants. The US government did not enforce the treaty to keep out the immigrants.

The situation escalated with the Grattan affair in 1854 when a detachment of US soldiers illegally entered a Sioux encampment to arrest those accused of stealing a cow, and in the process sparked a battle in which Chief Conquering Bear was killed.

Though intertribal fighting had existed before the arrival of white settlers, some of the post-treaty intertribal fighting can be attributed to mass killings of bison by white settlers and government agents. The US Army did not enforce treaty regulations and allowed hunters onto Native land to slaughter buffalo, providing protection and sometimes ammunition. One hundred thousand buffalo were killed each year until they were on the verge of extinction, which threatened the tribes' subsistence. These mass killings affected all tribes thus the tribes were forced onto each other's hunting grounds, where fighting broke out.

On July 20, 1867, an act of Congress created the Indian Peace Commission "to establish peace with certain hostile Indian tribes". The Indian Peace Commission was generally seen as a failure, and violence had reignited even before it was disbanded in October 1868. Two official reports were submitted to the federal government, ultimately recommending that the US cease recognizing tribes as sovereign nations, refrain from making treaties with them, employ military force against those who refused to relocate to reservations, and move the Bureau of Indian Affairs from the Department of the Interior to the Department of War. The system of treaties eventually deteriorated to the point of collapse, and a decade of war followed the commission's work. It was the last major commission of its kind.

From 1866 to 1868, the Lakota fought the United States Army in the Wyoming Territory and the Montana Territory in what is known as Red Cloud's War (also referred to as the Bozeman War). The war is named after Red Cloud, a prominent Lakota chief who led the war against the United States following encroachment into the area by the US military. The Sioux victory in the war led to their temporarily preserving their control of the Powder River country. The war ended with the Treaty of Fort Laramie of 1868.

=== Fort Laramie Treaty of 1868 ===
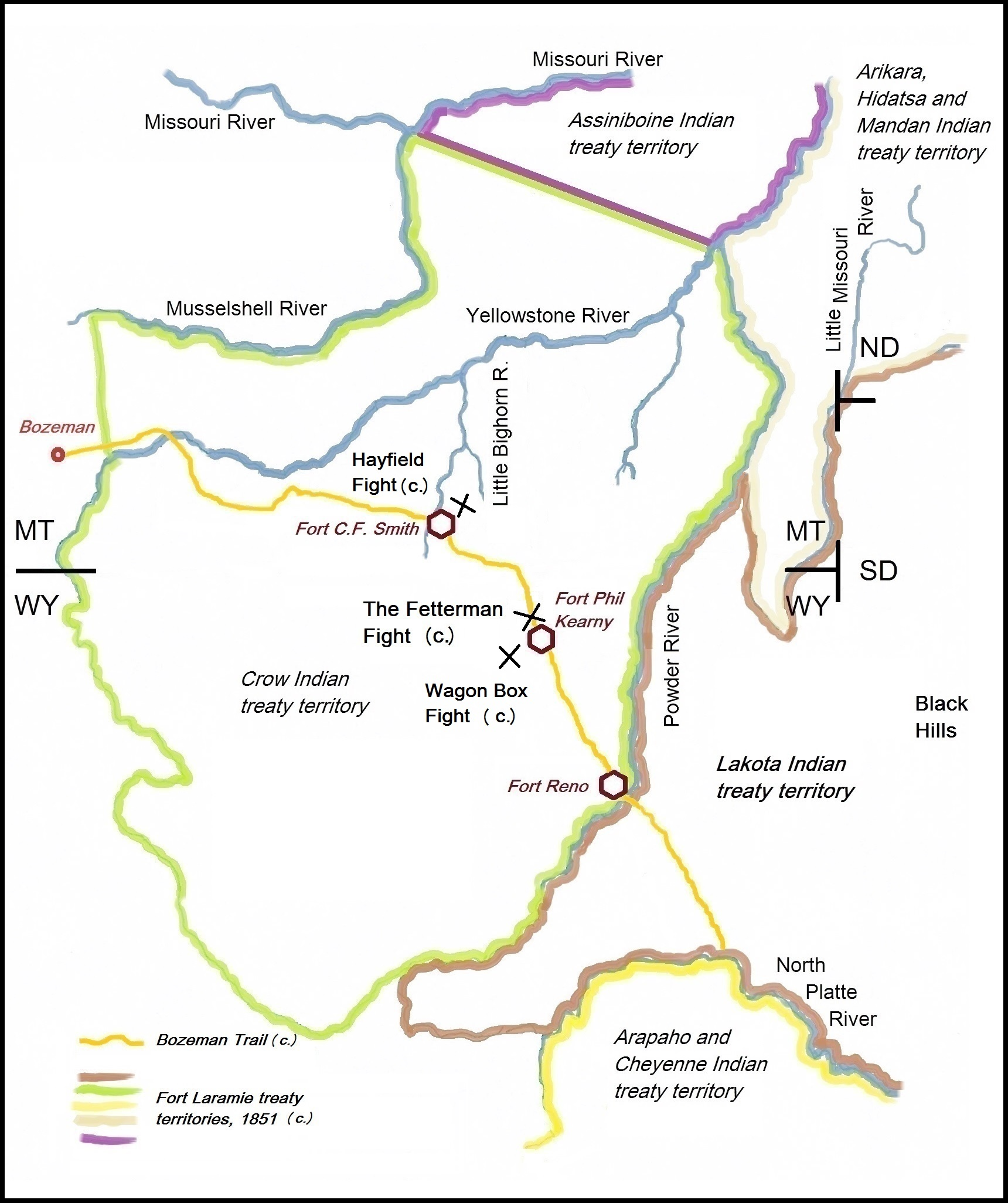
Map showing the major battles of Red Cloud's War, along with major treaty boundaries. During Red Cloud's War, the Sioux defeated the US Army on the same plains on which they previously defeated the Crow

The Treaty of Fort Laramie (also the Sioux Treaty of 1868 (Note: officially the Treaty with the Sioux–Brulé, Oglala, Miniconjou, Yanktonai, Hunkpapa, Blackfeet, Cuthead, Two Kettle, Sans Arcs, and Santee–and Arapaho, 1968)) was an agreement between the US and the Oglala, Miniconjou, and Sicangu bands of Lakota people, Yanktonai Dakota and Arapaho Nation, following the failure of the first Fort Laramie treaty, signed in 1851. It established the Great Sioux Reservation including ownership of the Black Hills, and set aside additional lands as "unceded Indian territory" in areas of South Dakota, Wyoming, and Nebraska, and possibly Montana. (Note: depending on the interpretation of article XVI) It established that the US government would hold the authority to punish not only white settlers who committed crimes against the tribes but also tribe members who committed crimes and who were to be delivered to the government rather than face charges in tribal courts. It stipulated that the government would abandon forts along the Bozeman Trail, and included a number of provisions designed to encourage a transition to farming, and move the tribes "closer to the white man's way of life." The treaty protected specified rights of third parties not partaking in the negotiations, and effectively ended Red Cloud's War.

The treaty overall, and in comparison with the 1851 agreement, represented a departure from earlier considerations of tribal customs, and demonstrated instead the government's "more heavy-handed position with regard to tribal nations, and ... desire to assimilate the Sioux into American property arrangements and social customs." According to one source, "animosities over the treaty arose almost immediately" when a group of Miniconjou were informed they were no longer welcome to trade at Fort Laramie, being south of their newly established territory. This was notwithstanding that the treaty did not make any stipulation that the tribes could not travel outside their land, only that they would not permanently occupy outside land. The only travel expressly forbidden by the treaty was that of white settlers onto the reservation.

The government eventually broke the terms of the treaty following the Black Hills Gold Rush and an expedition into the area by George Armstrong Custer in 1874 and failed to prevent white settlers from moving onto tribal lands. Rising tensions eventually lead again to open conflict in the Great Sioux War of 1876. The 1868 treaty was modified three times by the US Congress between 1876 and 1889, each time taking more land originally granted, including unilaterally seizing the Black Hills in 1877. The treaty formed the basis of the 1980 Supreme Court case, United States v. Sioux Nation of Indians, in which the court ruled that tribal lands covered under the treaty had been taken illegally by the US government, and the tribe was owed compensation plus interest. As of 2018, this amounted to more than $1 billion. The Sioux have refused the payment, demanding instead the return of their land.

=== Great Sioux War of 1876 and the Wounded Knee Massacre ===
The ongoing raids and battles on the northern Plains that lasted from 1850 to 1890 are collectively known as the Sioux Wars. Included are the Dakota War of 1862 (1862–1864), Red Cloud's War (1866–1868) and the Black Hills War which includes the Battle of the Little Bighorn(1876–1877); the Massacre at Wounded Knee in 1890 is considered the end of the Sioux wars and the beginning of a new era for Dakota and Lakota people.

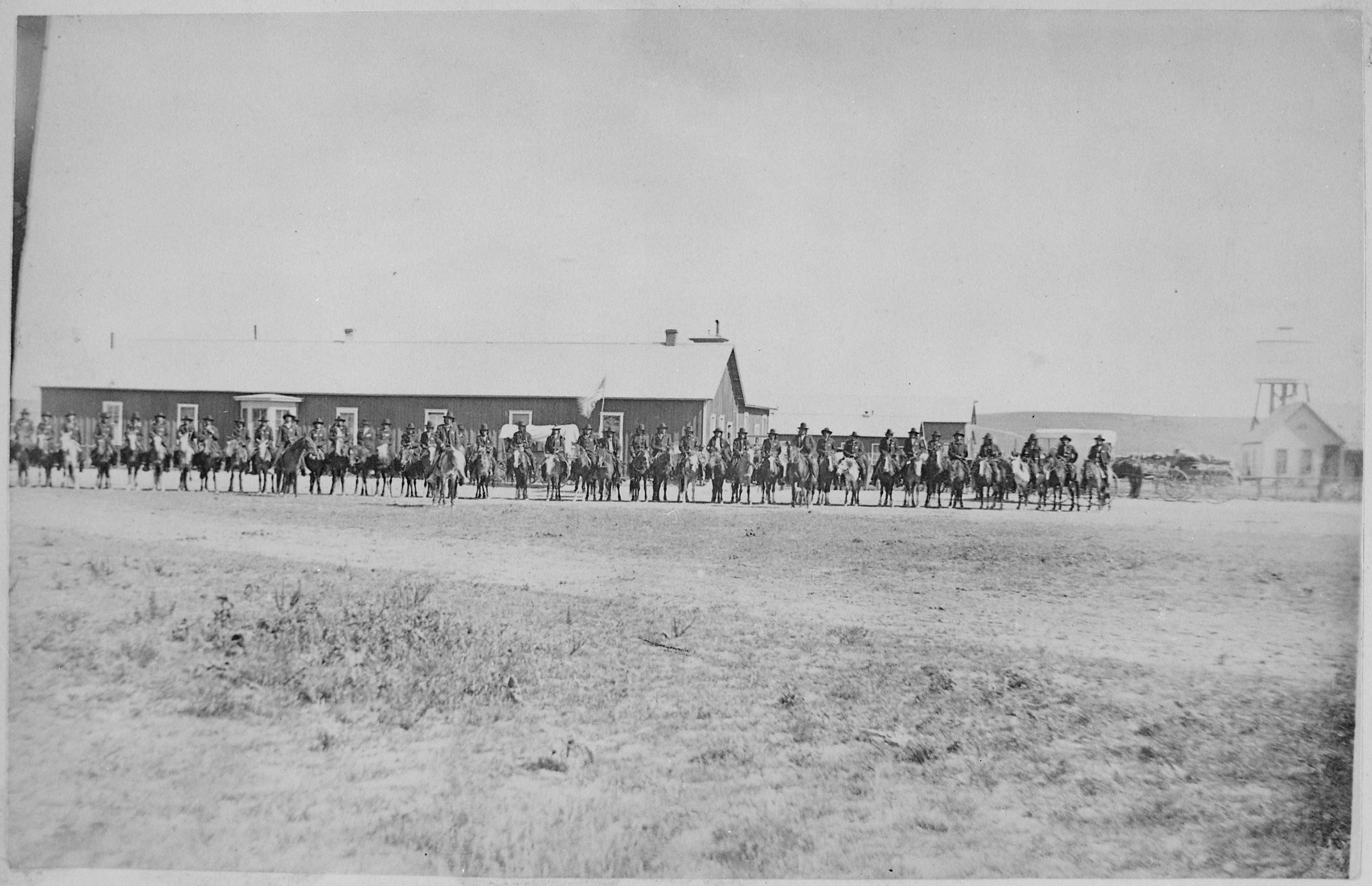
Sioux Indian police lined up on horseback in front of Pine Ridge Agency buildings, Dakota Territory, August 9, 1882

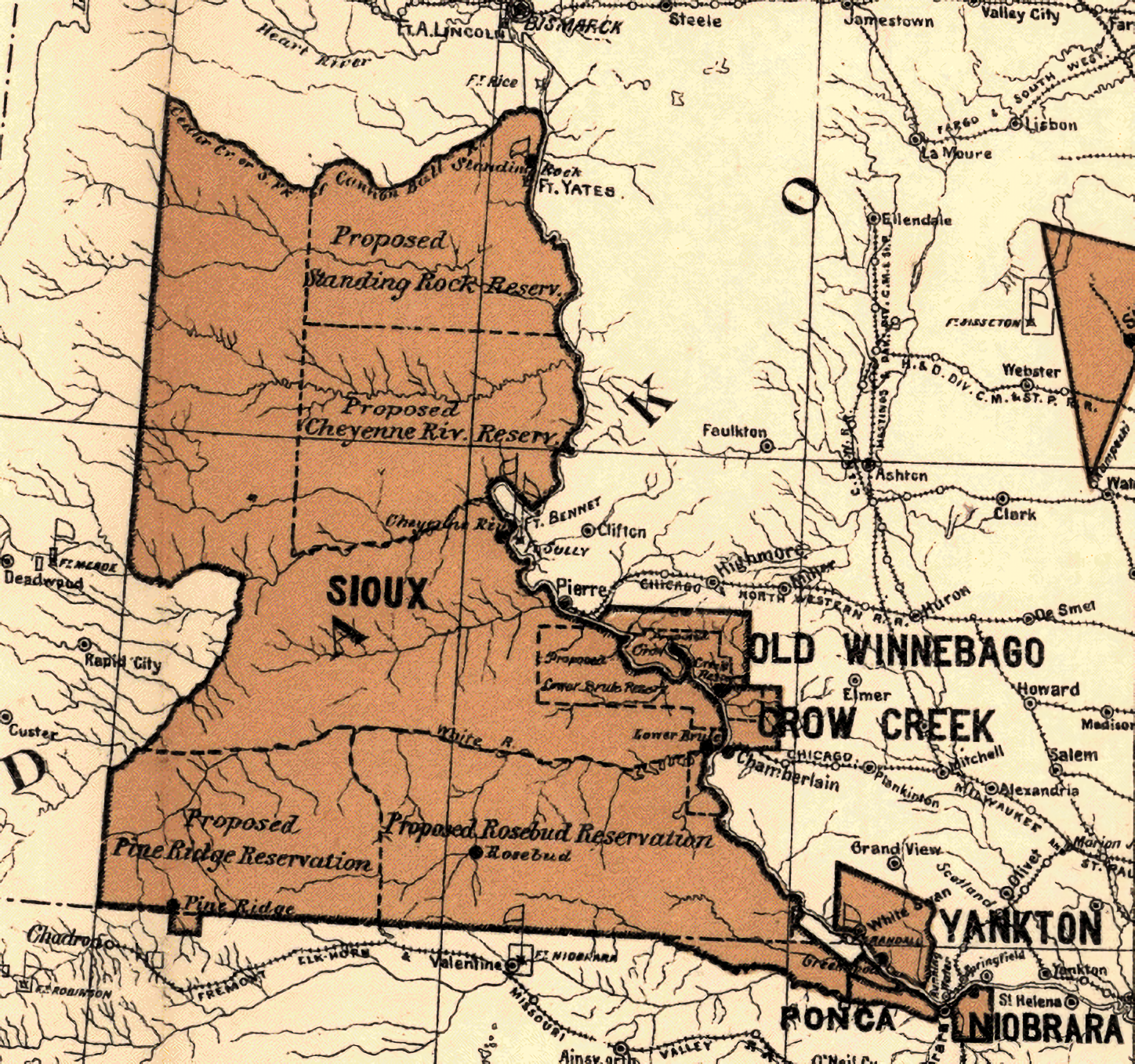
Great Sioux Reservation, 1888; established by Treaty of Fort Laramie (1868)

The Great Sioux War of 1876, also known as the Black Hills War, was a series of battles and negotiations that occurred in 1876 and 1877 between the Lakota, Northern Cheyenne, and the United States. The cause of the war was the desire of the US government to obtain ownership of the Black Hills. Gold had been discovered in the Black Hills and settlers began to encroach onto tribal lands, and the Sioux and Cheyenne refused to cede ownership to the United States. The earliest engagement was the Battle of Powder River, and the final battle was the Wolf Mountain. Included are the Battle of the Rosebud, Battle of Warbonnet Creek, Battle of Slim Buttes, Battle of Cedar Creek, and the Dull Knife Fight.

Among the many battles and skirmishes of the war was the Battle of the Little Bighorn, often known as Custer's Last Stand, the most storied of the many encounters between the US army and mounted Plains tribes. The Battle of the Little Bighorn, known to the Lakota as the Battle of the Greasy Grass and also commonly referred to as Custer's Last Stand, was an armed engagement between combined forces of the Lakota, Northern Cheyenne, and Arapaho tribes and the 7th Cavalry Regiment of the United States Army. The battle, which resulted in the defeat of US forces, was the most significant action of the Great Sioux War of 1876. It took place on June 25–26, 1876, along the Little Bighorn River in the Crow Indian Reservation in southeastern Montana Territory.

The fight was an overwhelming victory for the Lakota, Northern Cheyenne, and Arapaho, who were led by several major war leaders, including Crazy Horse and Chief Gall, and had been inspired by the visions of Sitting Bull. The US 7th Cavalry, a force of 700 men, suffered a major defeat while under the command of Lieutenant Colonel George Armstrong Custer. Five of the 7th Cavalry's twelve companies were annihilated and Custer was killed. The total US casualty count included 268 dead and 55 severely wounded (six died later from their wounds), including four Crow scouts and at least two Arikara scouts. The Little Bighorn Battlefield National Monument honors those who fought on both sides. That victory notwithstanding, the US leveraged national resources to force the tribes to surrender, primarily by attacking and destroying their encampments and property. The Great Sioux War took place under the presidencies of Ulysses S. Grant and Rutherford B. Hayes. The Agreement of 1877 (19 Stat. 254, enacted February 28, 1877) officially annexed Sioux land and permanently established Indian reservations.

Mass grave for the dead Lakota after massacre of Wounded Knee.

The Wounded Knee Massacre was the last major armed conflict between the Lakota and the United States. It was described as a massacre by General Nelson A. Miles in a letter to the Commissioner of Indian Affairs. On December 29, 1890, five hundred troops of the 7th Cavalry Regiment, supported by four Hotchkiss guns (a lightweight artillery piece capable of rapid fire), surrounded an encampment of the Lakota bands of the Miniconjou and Hunkpapa with orders to escort them to the railroad for transport to Omaha, Nebraska. By the time it was over, 25 troopers and more than 150 Lakota Sioux lay dead, including men, women, and children. It remains unknown which side was responsible for the first shot; some of the soldiers are believed to have been the victims of "friendly fire" because the shooting took place at point-blank range in chaotic conditions. Around 150 Lakota are believed to have fled the chaos, many of whom may have died from hypothermia.

Following a three-day blizzard, the military hired civilians to bury the dead Lakota. The burial party found the deceased frozen; they were gathered up and placed in a mass grave on a hill overlooking the encampment from which some of the fire from the Hotchkiss guns originated. It was reported that four infants were found alive, wrapped in their deceased mothers' shawls. In all, 84 men, 44 women, and 18 children reportedly died on the field, while at least seven Lakota were mortally wounded.

For this 1890 offensive, the American army awarded twenty Medals of Honor, its highest commendation. Contemporary Native American activists have urged the medals to be withdrawn, calling them "medals of dishonor". According to Lakota William Thunder Hawk, "The Medal of Honor is meant to reward soldiers who act heroically. But at Wounded Knee, they didn't show heroism; they showed cruelty". In 2001, the National Congress of American Indians passed two resolutions condemning the Medals of Honor awards and called on the US government to rescind them.

=== 1890–1920s: Assimilation era ===
==== Land allotment ====
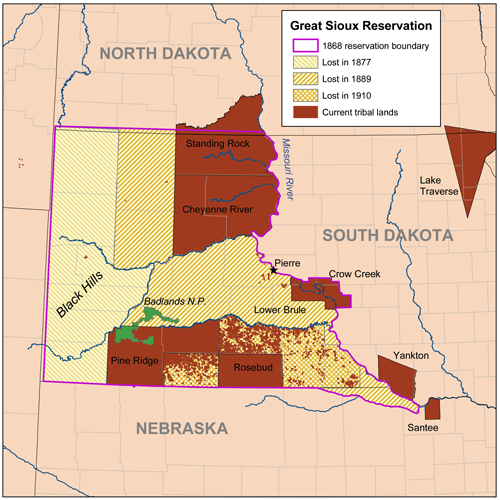
Map showing the Great Sioux Reservation and current reservations in North and South Dakota

By the 1880s, the Dakota and Lakota tribes were fragmented onto reservations which diminished in size over time. They lost hundreds of thousands of acres by the 1920s. In 1887, the United States Congress passed the General Allotment Act (Dawes Act), which began the assimilation of Dakota and Lakota people by forcing them to give up their traditional way of life. The Dawes Act ended traditional systems of land tenure, forcing tribes to adapt government-imposed systems of private property and to "assume a capitalist and proprietary relationship with property" that did not previously exist. In 1889, North Dakota and South Dakota were holding statehood conventions and demanded reduction of the Great Sioux Reservation, which was established by the Fort Laramie Treaty of 1868. Just months before those states were admitted to the Union in November 1889, Congress had passed an act which partitioned the Great Sioux Reservation into five smaller reservations,. Tribal leaders such as John Grass, Gall, and Sitting Bull opposed the bill, which created the following five reservations:

- Standing Rock Sioux Reservation with its agency at Fort Yates;
- Cheyenne River Reservation, with its agency on the Missouri River near the Cheyenne River confluence (later moved to Eagle Butte following the construction of Oahe Dam);
- Lower Brule Indian Reservation, with its agency near Fort Thompson;
- Rosebud Indian Reservation, with its agency near Mission, South Dakota; and
- Pine Ridge Reservation (Oglala Lakota), with its agency at Pine Ridge, South Dakota near the Nebraska border.

After the boundaries of these five reservations was established, the government opened up approximately 9 million acres (36,000 km^{2}), one-half of the former Great Sioux Reservation, for public purchase for ranching and homesteading. Much of the area was not homesteaded until the 1910s, after the Enlarged Homestead Act increased allocations to 320 acres (1.3 km^{2}) for "semi-arid land".

==== Boarding schools ====
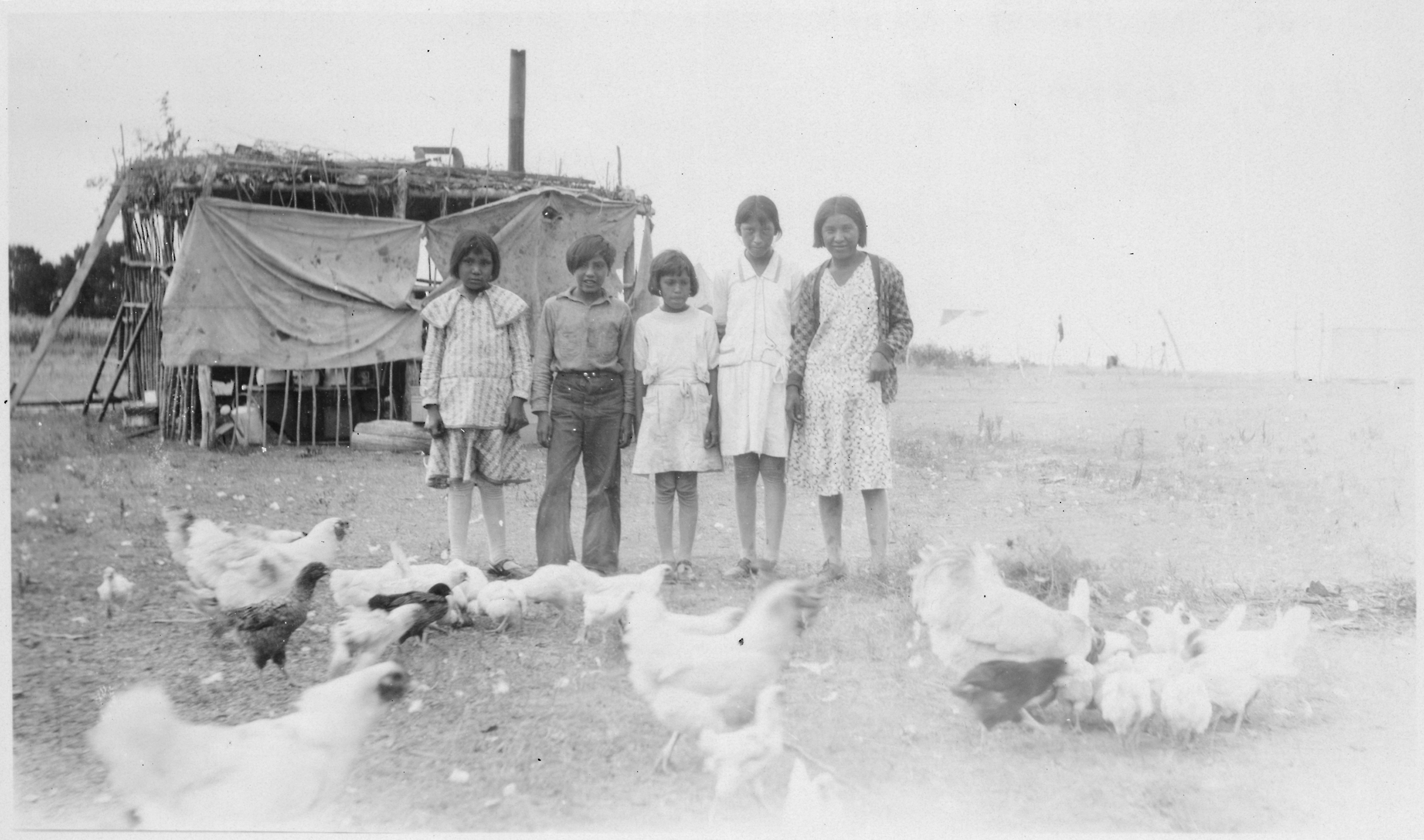
Children with their chickens, Standing Rock Agency (1947)

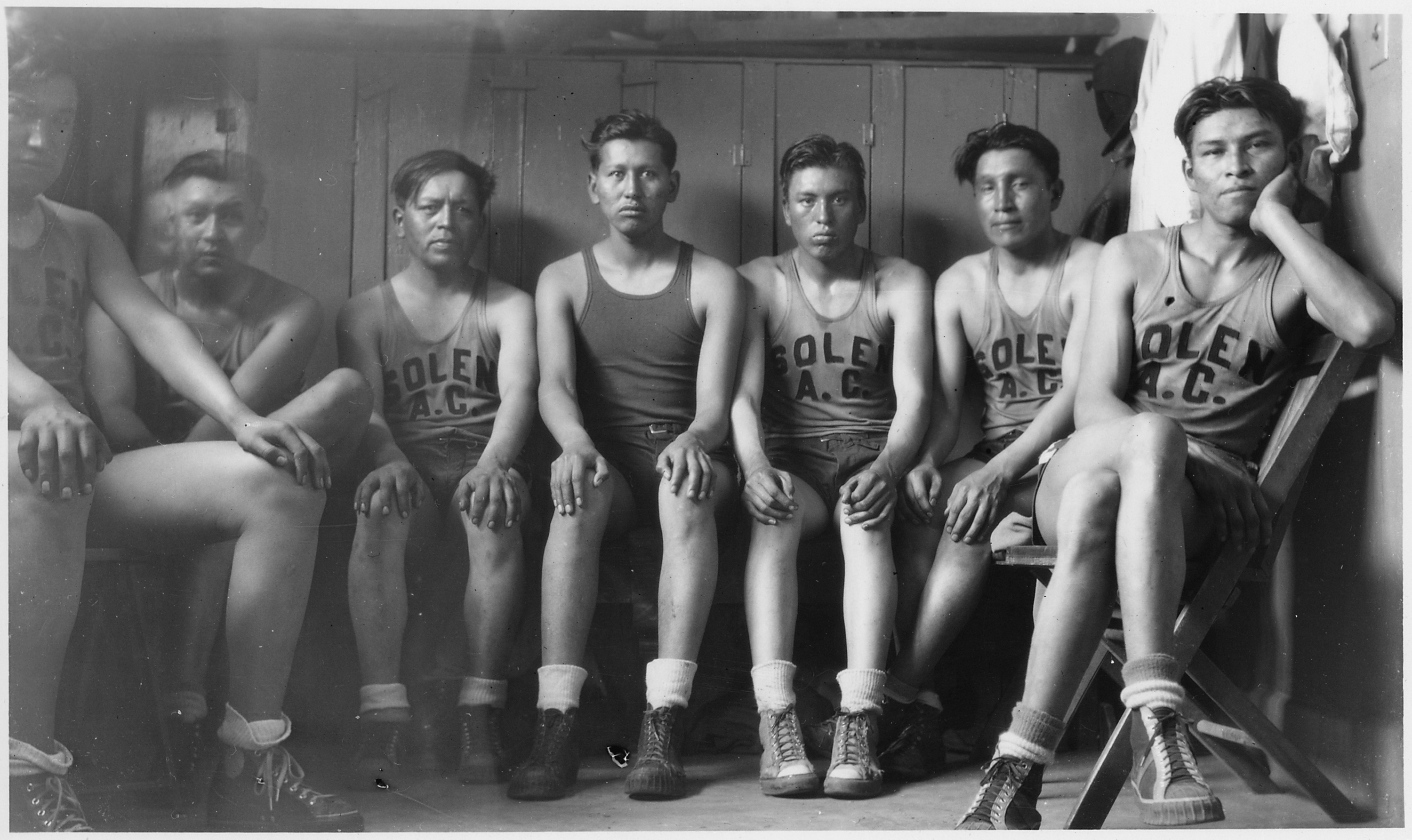
Solen basketball team, Standing Rock Agency (1947)

Besides the loss of land, the Dawes Act also "outlawed Native American culture and established a code of Indian offenses regulating individual behavior according to Euro-American norms of conduct." Any violations of this code were to be "tried in a Court of Indian Offenses on each reservation." Included with the Dawes Act were "funds to instruct Native Americans in Euro-American patterns of thought and behavior through Indian Service schools" which forced many of the tribes into sending their children to boarding schools.

Boarding schools were intended to "kill the Indian to save the man", which meant the destruction of Dakota and Lakota societies: children were taken away from their families, their traditional culture and kinship roles. They were dressed in Eurocentric clothing, given English names, had their hair cut and were forbidden to speak their languages. Their religions and ceremonies were also outlawed and forbidden. The goal was to teach academic studies in English, vocational skills suited to Euro-American society such as farming in order to replace traditional lifeways. These schools were overcrowded and had poor sanitary conditions, which led to infectious diseases and students running away or dying while at the schools. The schools achieved mixed outcomes of traumatic experiences for many while others such as Charles Eastman, Ella Cara Deloria, Luther Standing Bear and Zitkala-Sa were able to use the education to their advantage to help their people.

=== 1930s–1960s: Reorganization Act and Relocation Act ===
The Indian Reorganization Act (IRA) sought to overturn many of the policies of the Dawes Act by reversing the traditional goal of cultural assimilation of the tribes into American society. The IRA "ended land allotment, prohibited non-consensual land seizure, recognized tribal governments, encouraged the writing of tribal constitutions, and empowered Native people to manage their own resources". Between 1934 and 1945, the tribes voted on their government constitutions. The Yankton Sioux Tribe is the only tribe in South Dakota that did not comply with the IRA and chose to keep its traditional government, whose constitution was ratified in 1891. The Spirit Lake Tribe and Standing Rock Tribe also voted against the IRA. Because their constitution are not written under the authority of the IRA, they had to established tribal corporations which are managed separately from the tribal government in order to apply for loans. In Minnesota, the IRA recognized the Dakota tribes as communities, allowing them to reestablish their reservations and to repurchase land lost during the Dakota War of 1862. The Lower Sioux and Prairie Island reservations formed constitutions in 1936, the Upper Sioux formed as a community in 1938 and wrote a constitution in 1995, and the Shakopee Mdewakanton officially formed an IRA government in 1969.

Despite the IRA giving more land rights to the tribes, the federal government seized thousands of acres of land through the Flood Control Act of 1944 by creating the Oahe Dam. As a result of the dam's construction the Cheyenne River Indian Reservation lost 150,000 acres (61,000 hectares) bringing it down to 2,850,000 acres (1,150,000 ha) today. The Standing Rock Sioux Reservation lost 55,993 acres (22,660 ha) leaving it with 2,300,000 acres (930,000 ha). Much of the land was taken by eminent domain claims made by the Bureau of Reclamation. Over and above the land loss, most of the reservations' prime agricultural land was included in the loss. Most of the land was unable to be harvested (to allow the trees to be cut down for wood) before the land was flooded over with water. One visitor to the reservations later asked why there were so few older Indians on the reservations and was told that "the old people had died of heartache" after the construction of the dam and the loss of the reservations' land. In 2015, poverty was still a problem for the displaced populations in the Dakotas, who were still seeking compensation for the loss of the towns submerged under Lake Oahe, and the loss of their traditional ways of life.

The Indian Relocation Act of 1956 encouraged many tribal members to leave their reservation homes for cities. Some tribes had a dramatic loss of population: the Yankton Sioux Tribe fell to only 1,000 members living on the reservation in the 1950s; the Santee Sioux Reservation lost 60 percent of its population (by 1962, only 2,999, mostly elderly people remained). Franklin D. Roosevelt's New Deal and Lyndon Johnson's War on Poverty brought new schools, roads, health clinics, and housing to the reservations.

=== 1970s: Wounded Knee incident ===
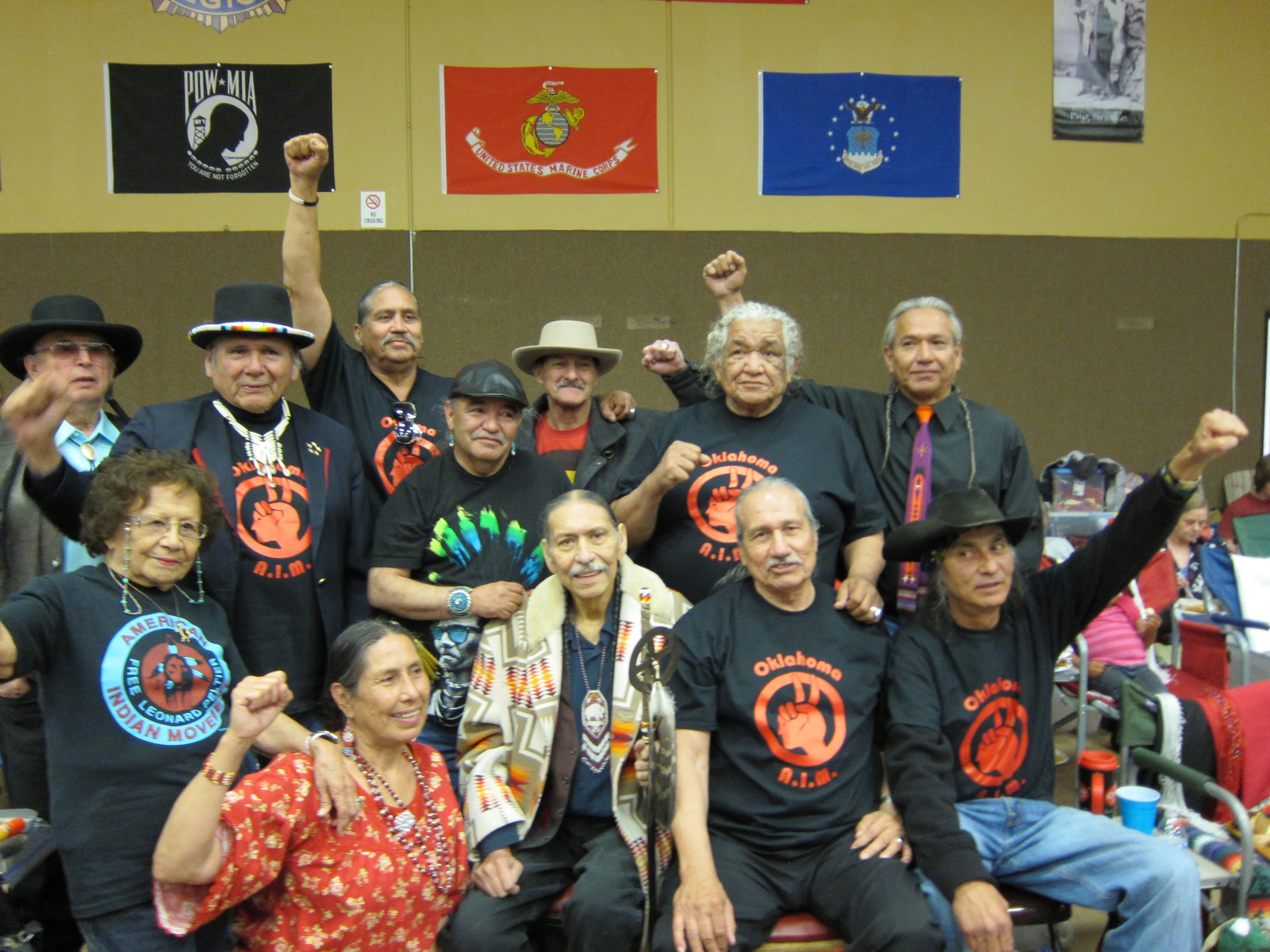
Wounded Knee AIM veterans (2013)

Conflicting political values from "traditionalists" against the new form of government promoted through the Indian Reorganization Act created long-lasting tensions on the reservations. The accusations of corruption by tribal leaders would lead to the Wounded Knee incident which began on February 27, 1973, when the town of Wounded Knee, South Dakota was seized by followers of the American Indian Movement (AIM). The occupiers controlled the town for 71 days while various state and federal law enforcement agencies such as the Federal Bureau of Investigation and the United States Marshals Service laid siege.

The members of AIM were protesting what they said was the local corrupt government, along with federal issues affecting Indian reservation communities, as well as the lack of justice from border counties. Native Americans from many other communities, primarily urban areas, mobilized to come and join the occupation. The FBI dispatched agents and US Marshals to cordon off the site. Later a higher-ranking DOJ representative took control of the government's response. Through the resulting siege that lasted for 71 days, twelve people were wounded, including an FBI agent left paralyzed. In April at least two people died of gunfire, after which the Oglala Lakota called an end to the occupation). Additionally, two other people, one of them an African American civil rights activist, Ray Robinson, went missing, and are believed to have been killed during the occupation, though their bodies have never been found. Afterward, 1200 American Indians were arrested. Wounded Knee drew international attention to the plight of American Indians and AIM leaders were tried in a Minnesota federal court. The court dismissed their case on the basis of governmental prosecutorial misconduct. However, Leonard Peltier was convicted of murdering two FBI agents in a June 26, 1975, shooting on the Pine Ridge Reservation in South Dakota.

=== 1980s–present: Self-determination ===
After the Wounded Knee Incident, the Dakota and Lakota continued to push for their tribal rights and self-determination.

==== Black Hills Land claims ====
The Sioux never accepted the legitimacy of the forced deprivation of their Black Hills reservation. Throughout the 1920s–1950s, they pushed their Black Hills land claim into federal court. After 60 years of litigation in the Court of Claims, the Indian Claims Commission, the US Congress, the Supreme Court heard the case in 1980 and ruled that the federal government had illegally taken the Black Hills and awarded more than $100 million in reparations to the tribes. Stating that the land was never for sale, the tribes have refused to accept the money which is now over one billion dollars.

==== Republic of Lakotah ====
After the Wounded Knee Incident in 1973, the International Indian Treaty Council was formed to support grassroots Indigenous struggles for human rights, self-determination and environmental justice through information dissemination, networking, coalition building, advocacy and technical assistance. This influenced activists who declared that they had founded the Republic of Lakotah in 2007. The Lakota Freedom Delegation, a group of controversial Native American activists, declared on December 19, 2007, the Lakota were withdrawing from all treaties signed with the United States to regain sovereignty over their nation. One of the activists, Russell Means, claimed that the action was legal and cites natural, international and US law. The group considers Lakota to be a sovereign nation, although as yet the state is generally unrecognized. The proposed borders reclaim thousands of square kilometres of North and South Dakota, Wyoming, Nebraska and Montana. Not all leaders of the Lakota Tribal Governments support or recognize the declaration.

==== Foster care system ====
Throughout the decades, thousands of Native American children were forcibly removed from their homes and sent to boarding schools with a primary objective of assimilating Native American children and youth into Euro-American culture, while at the same time providing a basic education in Euro-American subject matters. Many children lost knowledge of their culture and languages, as well as faced physical and sexual abuse at these schools. In 1978, the government tried to put an end to these boarding schools (and placement into foster families) with the Indian Child Welfare Act (ICWA), which says except in the rarest circumstances, Native American children must be placed with their relatives or tribes. It also says states must do everything it can to keep Native families together.

In 2011, the Lakota made national news when NPR's investigative series called Lost Children, Shattered Families aired. It exposed what many critics consider to be the "kidnapping" of Lakota children from their homes by the state of South Dakota's Department of Social Services. The NPR investigation found South Dakota has the most cases which fail to abide by the ICWA. In South Dakota, Native American children make up less than 15 percent of the child population, yet they make up more than half of the children in foster care. The state receives thousands of dollars from the federal government for every child it takes from a family, and in some cases, the state gets even more money if the child is Native American.

Lakota activists Madonna Thunder Hawk and Chase Iron Eyes worked with the Lakota People's Law Project as they sought to end what they claimed were unlawful seizures of Native American Lakota children in South Dakota and to stop the state practice of placing these children in non-Native homes. They are currently working to redirect federal funding away from the state of South Dakota's Department of Social Systems to a new tribal foster care programs. In 2015, in response to the investigative reports by NPR, the Lakota People's Law Project as well as the coalition of all nine Lakota/Dakota reservations in South Dakota, the Bureau of Indian Affairs updated the ICWA guidelines to give more strength to tribes to intervene on behalf of the children, stating, "The updated guidelines establish that an Indian child, parent or Indian custodian, or tribe may petition to invalidate an action if the Act or guidelines have been violated, regardless of which party's rights were violated. This approach promotes compliance with ICWA and reflects that ICWA is intended to protect the rights of each of these parties." The new guidelines also not only prevent courts from taking children away based on socioeconomic status but give a strict definition of what is to be considered harmful living conditions. Previously, the state of South Dakota used "being poor" as harmful.

==== Protest against the Dakota Access oil pipeline ====
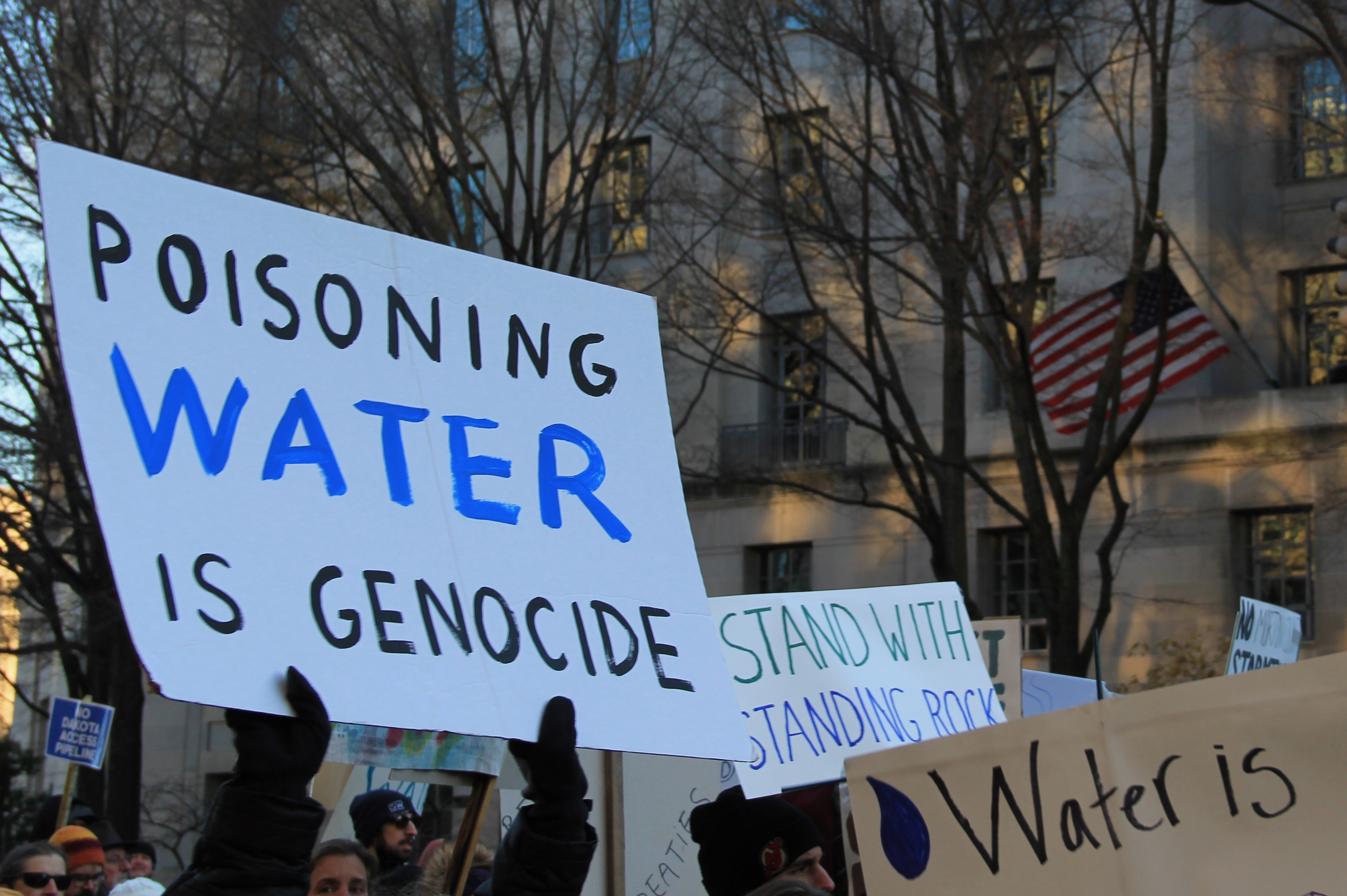
Demonstration in support of Standing Rock to stop DAPL occurred all over the world throughout 2016 and in March 2017 in Washington, DC

In the summer of 2016, tribal members and the Standing Rock Sioux Tribe began a protest against construction of the Dakota Access oil pipeline, also known as the Bakken pipeline, which, if completed, is designed to carry hydrofracked crude oil from the Bakken oil fields of North Dakota to the oil storage and transfer hub of Patoka, Illinois. The pipeline travels only half a mile north of the Standing Rock Sioux reservation and is designed to pass underneath the Missouri River and upstream of the reservation, causing many concerns over the tribe's drinking water safety, environmental protection, and harmful impacts on culture. The pipeline company claims that the pipeline will provide jobs, reduce American dependence on foreign oil and reduce the price of gas.

The conflict sparked a nationwide debate and much news media coverage. Thousands of Indigenous and non-Indigenous supporters joined the protest, and several camp sites were set up south of the construction zone. The protest was peaceful, and alcohol, drugs and firearms were not allowed at the campsite or the protest site. On August 23, Standing Rock Sioux Tribe released a list of 87 tribal governments who wrote resolutions, proclamations and letters of support stating their solidarity with Standing Rock and the Sioux people. Since then, many more Native American organizations, environmental groups and civil rights groups have joined the effort in North Dakota, including the Black Lives Matter movement, Vermont Senator Bernie Sanders, the 2016 Green Party presidential candidate Jill Stein and her running mate Ajamu Baraka, and many more. The Washington Post called it a "National movement for Native Americans."

==== Return of artifacts ====
In November 2022, 150 sacred artifacts were repatriated to the Lakota Sioux peoples. They were stored for more than a century at the Founders Museum in Barre, Massachusetts. However, these are just a small fraction of circa 870,000 Native American artifacts (including nearly 110,000 human remains) that are still at prestigious colleges, museums and the federal government.

== Language ==
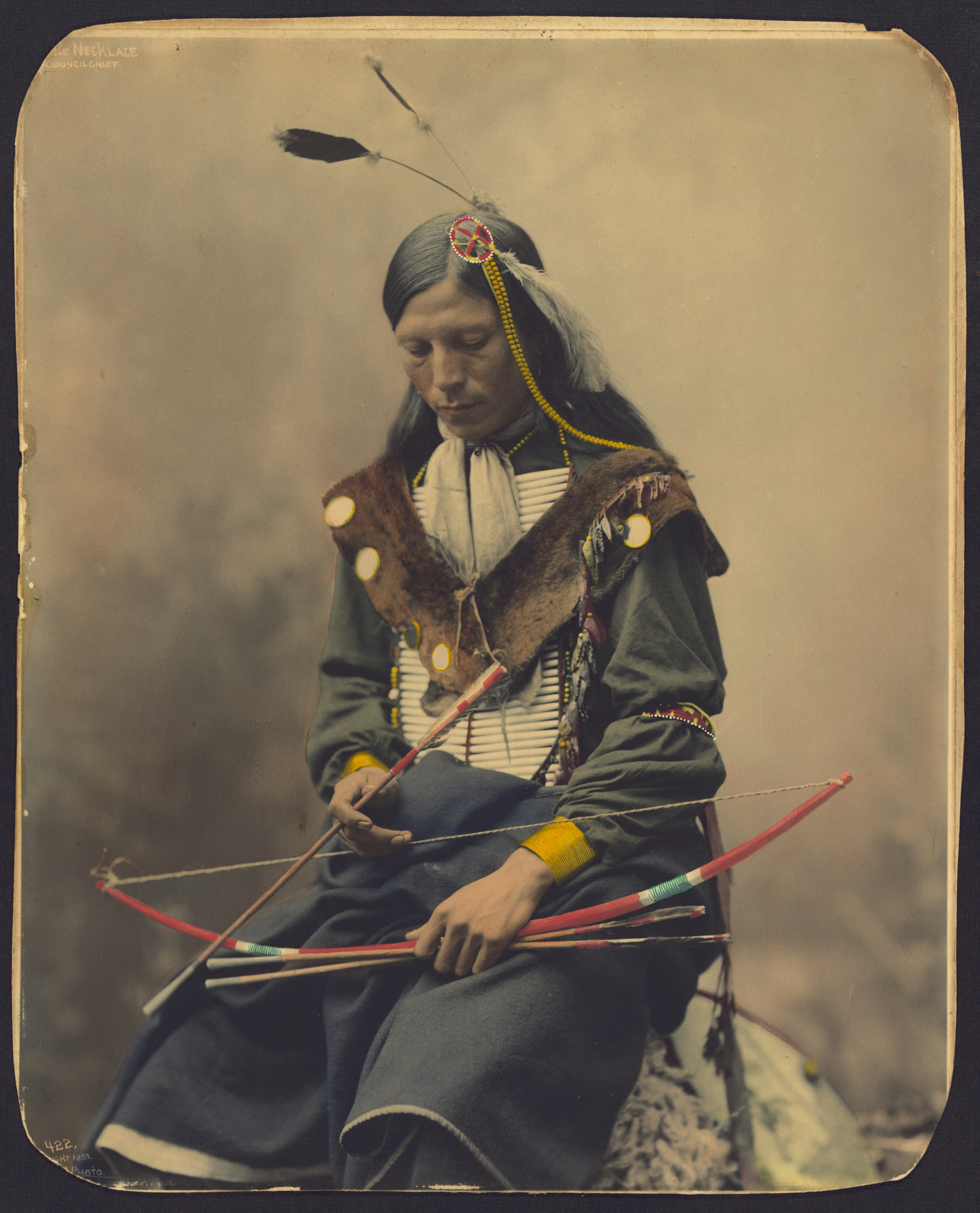
Chief Bone Necklace, an Oglala Lakota from the Pine Ridge Indian Reservation (1899)

The Sioux speak three closely related language groups:

1. Lakota (Lakȟóta, Teton, Thítȟuŋwaŋ) (Note: Spoken by seven subtribes: the Sicangu (Sičháŋǧu), Oglala (Oglála), Sans Arc (Itázipčho), Hunkpapa (Húŋkpapȟa), Miniconjou (Mnikȟówožu), Sihasapa (Sihásapa), and Two Kettles (Oóhenuŋpa).)
2. Eastern Dakota (Dakhóta, Santee–Sisseton)
  - Santee (Isáŋyáthi) (Note: Spoken by two bands: the Mdewakanton (Bdewákhaŋthuŋwaŋ) and the Wahpekute (Waȟpékhute).)
  - Sisseton (Sisíthuŋwaŋ) (Note: Spoken by two bands: the Sisseton (Sisíthuŋwaŋ) and the Wahpeton (Waȟpéthuŋwaŋ).)
3. Western Dakota (Dakȟóta, Yankton–Yanktonai, Wičhíyena)
  - Yankton (Iháŋktȟuŋwaŋ)
  - Yanktonai (Iháŋktȟuŋwaŋna) (Note: Spoken by two bands: the Upper Yanktonai and Lower Yanktonai (Húŋkpathina).)

An earlier three-way division identified Lakota, "Dakota" (Santee–Sisseton), and "Nakota" (Yankton–Yanktonai) as the three varieties of a single Sioux language. However, the Yankton–Yanktonai people never used the autonym Nakhóta, pronouncing their name Dakȟóta, roughly the same as the Santee–Sisseton.

The name Nakhóta or Nakhóda, rendered in English as Nakota, is used by the Assiniboine and Stoney people, two groups closely related to the Sioux; the Assiniboine language and the Stoney language are the other two languages of the Dakotan (Sioux–Assiniboine–Stoney) subfamily of the Siouan languages, forming a branch parallel to Sioux (Lakota, Western Dakota, and Eastern Dakota).

The term Dakota has also been applied by anthropologists and governmental departments to refer to all Sioux groups, resulting in names such as Teton Dakota, Santee Dakota, etc. This was mainly because of the misrepresented translation of the Odawa word from which Sioux is derived.

== Ethnic and modern geographical divisions ==
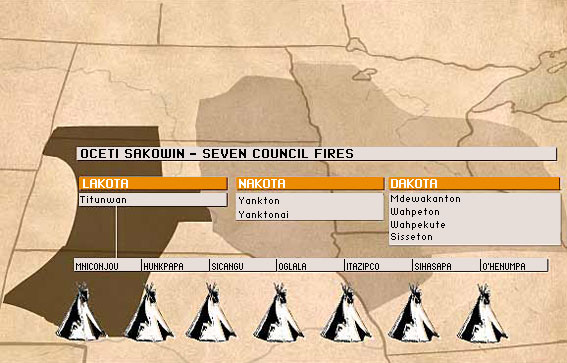
Santee Dakota, Yankton-Yanktonai and Lakota historic distribution (the map still misnames the Yankton-Yanktonai grouping as Nakota)

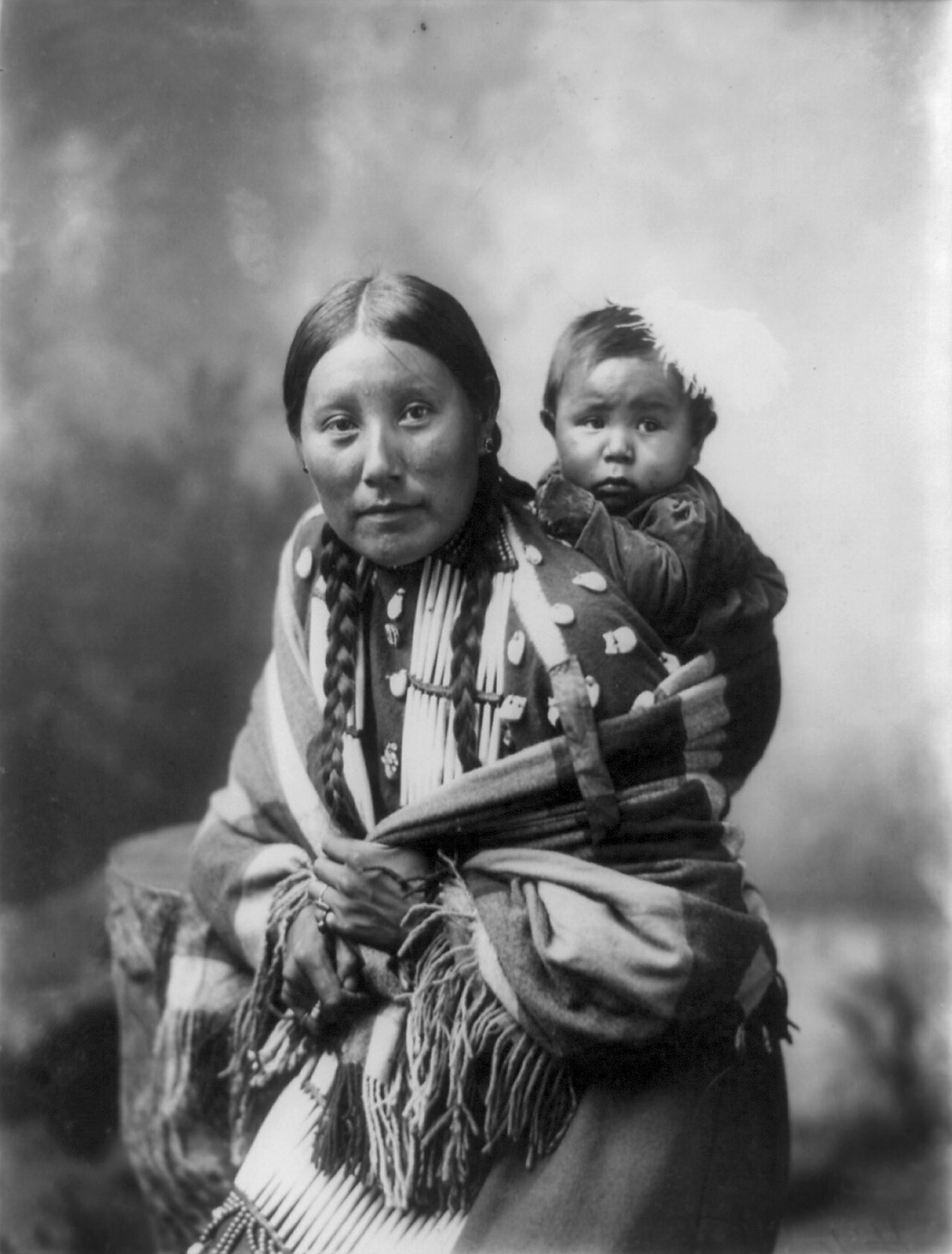
Portrait of Stella Yellow Shirt and her baby (Dakota, 1899)

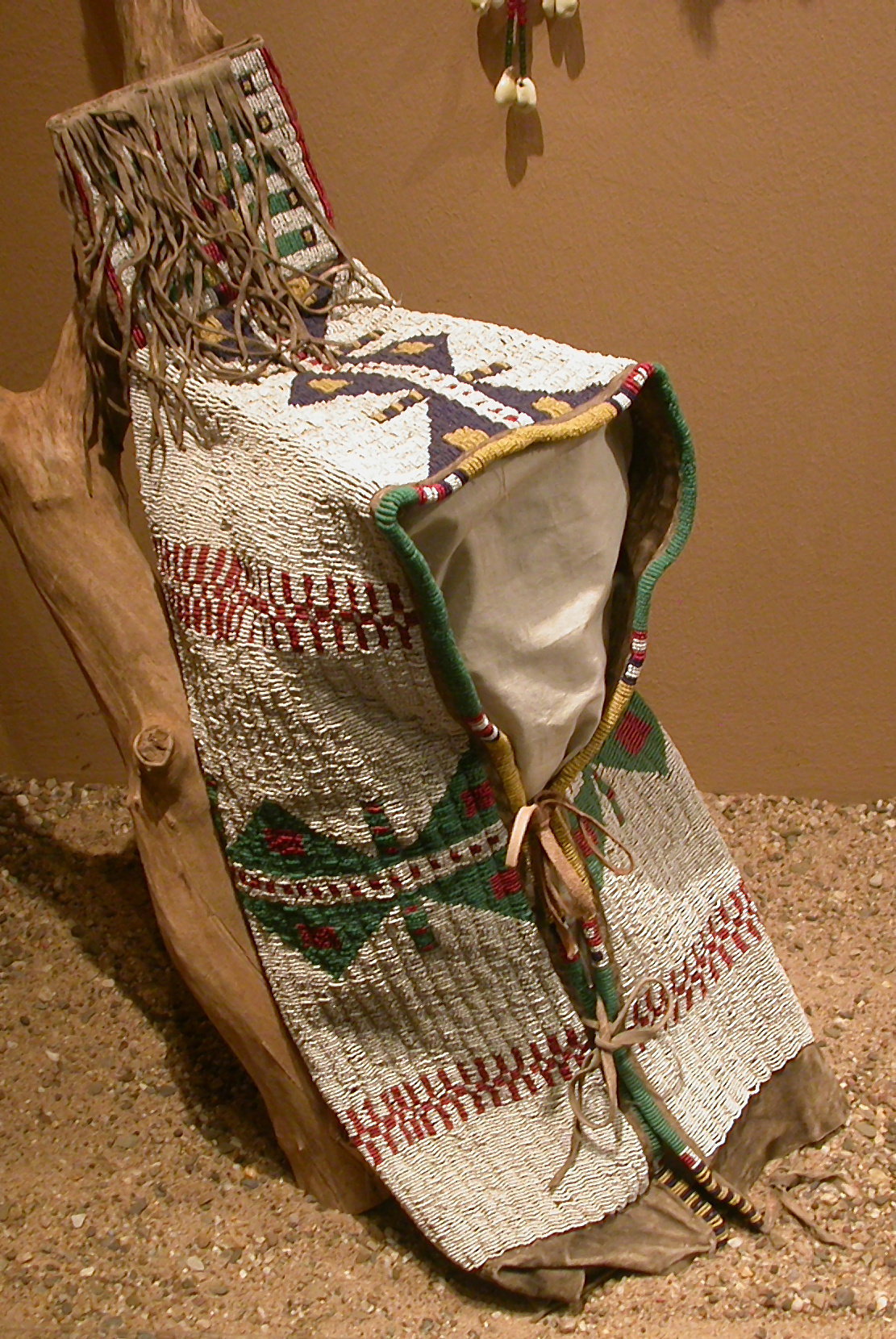
Sioux cradleboard

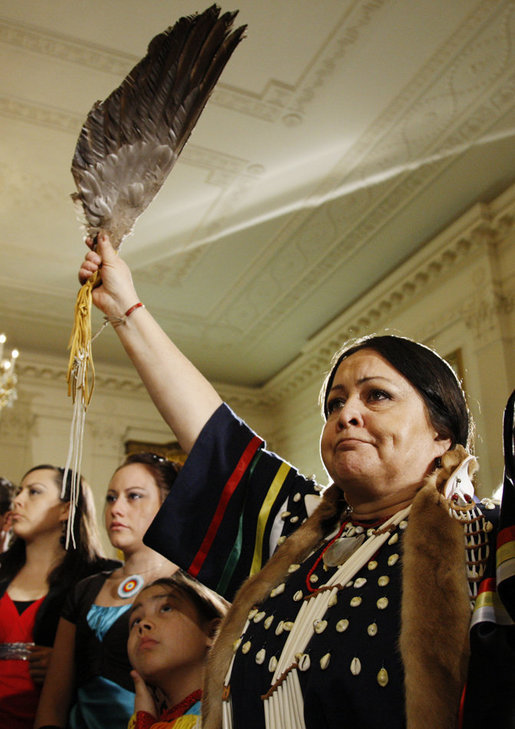
Family members of US Army Master Sgt. Woodrow Wilson Keeble attending his Medal of Honor ceremony

The Sioux are divided into three ethnic groups, the larger of which are divided into sub-groups, and further branched into bands. The earliest known European record of the Sioux identified them in Minnesota, Iowa, and Wisconsin. After the introduction of the horse in the early 18th century, the Sioux dominated larger areas of land—from present-day Central Canada to the Platte River, from Minnesota to the Yellowstone River, including the Powder River country.

The Sioux maintain many separate tribal governments scattered across several reservations and communities in North America: in the Dakotas, Minnesota, Nebraska, and Montana in the United States; and in Manitoba, and southern Saskatchewan in Canada. Today, many Sioux also live outside their reservations.

=== Isáŋyathi (Santee or Eastern Dakota) ===
In the past, they were a woodland people who thrived on hunting, fishing, and farming.

Migrations of Ojibwe from the east in the 17th and 18th centuries, with muskets supplied by the French and British, pushed the Dakota further into Minnesota and west and southward. The US gave the name Dakota Territory to the northern expanse west of the Mississippi River and up to its headwaters. Today, the Santee live on reservations, reserves, and communities in Minnesota, Nebraska, South Dakota, North Dakota, and Canada. However, after the Dakota war of 1862 many Santee were sent to Crow Creek Indian Reservation and in 1864 some from the Crow Creek Reservation were sent to the Santee Sioux Reservation.

- Santee division (Eastern Dakota) (Isáŋyathi)
  - Mdewakantonwan (Bdewékhaŋthuŋwaŋ 'Spirit Lake Village')
    notable persons: Little Crow
  - Sisseton (Sisíthuŋwaŋ, perhaps meaning 'Fishing Grounds Village')
  - Wahpekute (Waȟpékhute, 'Leaf Archers')
    notable persons: Inkpaduta
  - Wahpetonwan (Waȟpéthuŋwaŋ, 'Leaf Village')
    notable persons: Charles Eastman (Ohiyesa)

=== Iháŋkthuŋwaŋ-Iháŋkthuŋwaŋna (Yankton-Yanktonai or Western Dakota) ===
The Iháŋkthuŋwaŋ-Iháŋkthuŋwaŋna, also known by the anglicized names Yankton (Iháŋkthuŋwaŋ: 'End village') and Yanktonai (Iháŋkthuŋwaŋna: 'Little end village'), consist of two bands or two of the Seven Council Fires. According to Nasunatanka and Matononpa in 1880, the Yanktonai are divided into two sub-groups known as the Upper Yanktonai and the Lower Yanktonai (Hunkpatina). Today, most of the Yanktons live on the Yankton Indian Reservation in southeastern South Dakota. Some Yankton live on the Lower Brule Indian Reservation and Crow Creek Indian Reservation. The Yanktonai are divided into Lower Yanktonai, who occupy the Crow Creek Reservation; and Upper Yanktonai, who live in the northern part of Standing Rock Indian Reservation, on the Spirit Lake Tribe in central North Dakota, and in the eastern half of the Fort Peck Indian Reservation in northeastern Montana. In addition, they reside at several Canadian reserves, including Birdtail, Oak Lake, and Moose Woods.

They were involved in quarrying pipestone. The Yankton-Yanktonai moved into northern Minnesota. In the 18th century, they were recorded as living in the Mankato region of Minnesota.

- Yankton-Yanktonai division (Western Dakota) (Wičhíyena)
  - Yankton (Iháŋkthuŋwaŋ, 'End Village')
  - Yanktonai (Iháŋkthuŋwaŋna, 'Little End Village')
    - Upper Yanktonai
    - Unkpatina or Lower Yanktonai
    notable persons: Wanata and War Eagle

=== Thítȟuŋwaŋ (Teton or Lakota) ===
The Sun Dance, Wiwáŋyaŋg Wačípi, is an important ritual practiced by the Lakota, signifying the regeneration of the earth and its people. George Catlin created this artwork by observing and interacting with the Sioux, providing important primary witness accounts when photographs were not available.

Prior to obtaining horses in the 17th century, the Lakota were located near present-day Minnesota. Dominating the northern Great Plains with their light cavalry, the western Sioux quickly expanded their territory to the Rocky Mountains (which they call Heska, 'white mountains') by the 1800s.

Their traditional diet includes bison and corn. They traditionally acquired corn mostly through trade with the eastern Sioux and their linguistic cousins, the Mandan and Hidatsa along the Missouri River prior to the reservation era. The name Teton or Thítȟuŋwaŋ is archaic among the people, who prefer to call themselves Lakȟóta. Today, the Lakota are the largest and westernmost of the three groups, occupying lands in both North and South Dakota.

- Teton division (Lakota) (Thítȟuŋwaŋ, perhaps meaning 'Dwellers on the Prairie'):
  - Oglála (perhaps meaning 'Those Who Scatter Their Own')
    notable persons: Crazy Horse, Red Cloud, Black Elk, Iron Tail, Flying Hawk, and Billy Mills (Olympian)
  - Hunkpapa (Húŋkpapȟa, meaning 'Those who Camp by the Door' or 'Wanderers')
    notable persons: Sitting Bull
  - Sihasapa (Sihásapa, 'Blackfoot Sioux', not to be confused with the Algonquian-speaking Piegan Blackfeet)
    notable persons: John Grass (Matȟó Watȟákpe)
  - Miniconjou (Mnikȟówožu, 'Those who Plant by Water')
    notable persons: Lone Horn and Touch the Clouds
  - Sicangu (Sičháŋǧu, 'Burned Thigh'). Translated into French as Brulé.
    notable persons: Spotted Tail
  - Sans Arc (French translation of Itázipčho, 'Those Without Bows')
    notable persons: Black Hawk (Čhetáŋ Sápa')
  - Two Kettles (Oóhenuŋpa, 'Two Boilings')
    notable persons: Eagle Woman That All Look At (Waŋblí Ayútepiwiŋ)

== Reservations and reserves ==
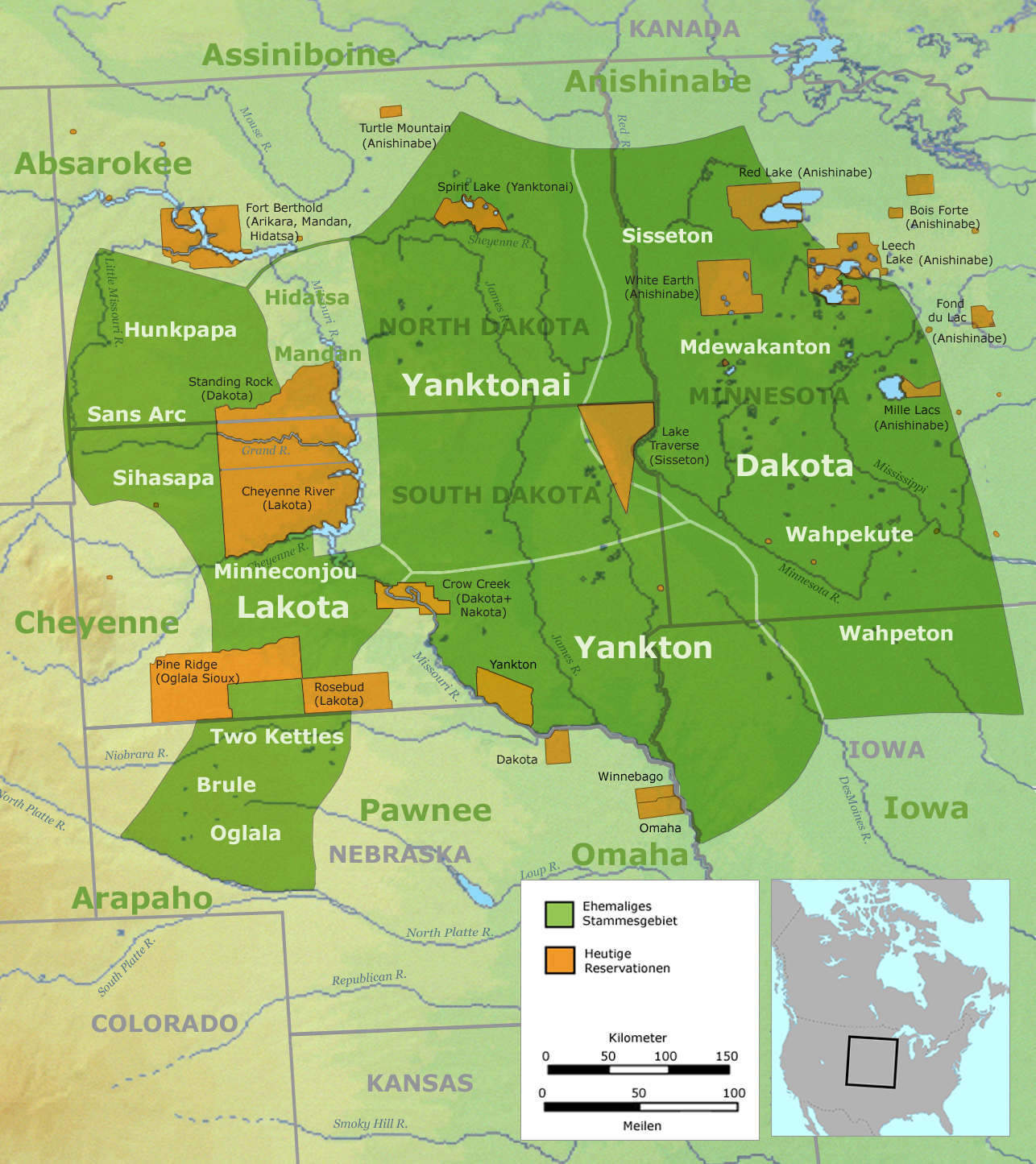
Location of Sioux tribes prior to 1770 (dark green) and their current reservations (orange) in the US

In the late 19th century, railroads wanted to build tracks through Indian lands. The railroad companies hired hunters to exterminate the bison herds, the Plains Indians' primary food supply. The Dakota and Lakota were forced to accept US-defined reservations in exchange for the rest of their lands and farming and ranching of domestic cattle, as opposed to a nomadic, hunting economy. During the first years of the Reservation Era, the Sioux people depended upon annual federal payments guaranteed by treaty for survival.

In Minnesota, the treaties of Traverse des Sioux and Mendota in 1851 left the Dakota with a reservation 20 miles (32 km) wide on each side of the Minnesota River.

Today, half of all enrolled Sioux in the United States live off-reservation. Enrolled members in any of the Sioux tribes in the United States are required to have ancestry that is at least 1/4 degree Sioux (the equivalent to one grandparent).

In Canada, the Canadian government recognizes the tribal community as First Nations. The land holdings of these First Nations are called Indian reserves.

Reserve/Reservation	Community	Bands residing	Location
Fort Peck Indian Reservation	Assiniboine and Sioux Tribes	Hunkpapa, Upper Yanktonai (Pabaksa), Sisseton, Wahpeton, and the Hudesabina (Red Bottom), Wadopabina (Canoe Paddler), Wadopahnatonwan (Canoe Paddlers Who Live on the Prairie), Sahiyaiyeskabi (Plains Cree-Speakers), Inyantonwanbina (Stone People), and Fat Horse Band of the Assiniboine	Montana, US
Spirit Lake Reservation _{(Formerly Devil's Lake Reservation)}	Spirit Lake Tribe _{(Mni Wakan Oyate)}	Wahpeton, Sisseton, Upper Yanktonai	North Dakota, US
Standing Rock Indian Reservation	Standing Rock Sioux Tribe	Lower Yanktonai, Sihasapa, Upper Yanktonai, Hunkpapa	North Dakota, South Dakota, US
Lake Traverse Indian Reservation	Sisseton Wahpeton Oyate	Sisseton, Wahpeton	South Dakota, US
Flandreau Indian Reservation	Flandreau Santee Sioux Tribe	Mdewakanton, Wahpekute, Wahpeton	South Dakota, US
Cheyenne River Indian Reservation	Cheyenne River Sioux Tribe	Minneconjou, Sihasapa, Two Kettle, Sans Arc	South Dakota, US
Crow Creek Indian Reservation	Crow Creek Sioux Tribe	Lower Yanktonai, Mdewakanton	South Dakota, US
Lower Brule Indian Reservation	Lower Brule Sioux Tribe	Sicangu (Brule)	South Dakota, US
Yankton Sioux Indian Reservation	Yankton Sioux Tribe	Yankton	South Dakota, US
Pine Ridge Indian Reservation	Oglala Lakota	Oglala, few Sicangu	South Dakota, US
Rosebud Indian Reservation	Rosebud Sioux Tribe (also as Sicangu Lakota or Upper Brulé Sioux Nation) _{(Sičháŋǧu Oyate)}	Sićangu (Brulé), few Oglala	South Dakota, US
Upper Sioux Indian Reservation	Upper Sioux Community _{(Pejuhutazizi Oyate)}	Mdewakanton, Sisseton, Wahpeton	Minnesota, US
Lower Sioux Indian Reservation	Lower Sioux Indian Community	Mdewakanton, Wahpekute	Minnesota, US
Shakopee-Mdewakanton Indian Reservation _{(Formerly Prior Lake Indian Reservation)}	Shakopee Mdewakanton Sioux Community	Mdewakanton, Wahpekute	Minnesota, US
Prairie Island Indian Community	Prairie Island Indian Community	Mdewakanton, Wahpekute	Minnesota, US
Santee Indian Reservation	Santee Sioux Nation	Mdewakanton, Wahpekute	Nebraska, US
Sioux Valley Dakota Nation Reserve, Fishing Station 62A Reserve*	Sioux Valley First Nation	Sisseton, Mdewakanton, Wahpeton, Wahpekute	Manitoba, Canada
Dakota Plains Indian Reserve 6A	Dakota Plains First Nation	Wahpeton, Sisseton	Manitoba, Canada
Dakota Tipi 1 Reserve	Dakota Tipi First Nation	Wahpeton	Manitoba, Canada
Birdtail Creek 57 Reserve, Birdtail Hay Lands 57A Reserve, Fishing Station 62A Reserve*	Birdtail Sioux First Nation	Mdewakanton, Wahpekute, Yanktonai	Manitoba, Canada
Canupawakpa Dakota First Nation, Oak Lake 59A Reserve, Fishing Station 62A Reserve*	Canupawakpa Dakota First Nation	Wahpekute, Wahpeton, Yanktonai	Manitoba, Canada
Standing Buffalo 78	Standing Buffalo Dakota Nation	Sisseton, Wahpeton	Saskatchewan, Canada
Whitecap Reserve	Whitecap Dakota First Nation	Wahpeton, Sisseton	Saskatchewan, Canada
Wood Mountain 160 Reserve, Treaty Four Reserve Grounds Indian Reserve No. 77*	Wood Mountain Lakota First Nation	Assiniboine (Nakota), Hunkpapa	Saskatchewan, Canada

- Reserves shared with other First Nations

== Population history ==
In year 1762 lieutenant James Gorrell complained about a lack of funds to disperse adequate presents to the 30,000 Sioux warriors for whom he estimated he had responsibility, which would indicate a total population of around 150,000 people (on average 5 persons per one warrior). Such high population appears to be confirmed by French Jesuits who visited 40 Sioux villages in 1660 and counted 5,000 men only in five of them (on average 1,000 men per village). Almost a century after Gorrell's estimate, in 1841, George Catlin estimated the Sioux as up to 50,000 people, and mentioned that they had just lost approx. 8,000 dead to smallpox a few years prior. Alexander Ramsey (Indian Affairs 1849) estimated that in 1846 the Sioux had 5,000 lodges averaging over 10 people per lodge, indicating a population of over 50,000. During the second half of the 19th century Sioux population further declined. In 1865 the Sioux were estimated at up to 40,000 people. Indian Affairs 1880 returned 31,747 people. The census of 1890 returned 25,675. Indian Affairs 1900 returned 27,169. The census of 1910 returned 23,318 (including 14,284 Tetons). In addition Canadian Indian Affairs counted 2,000 Sioux in Canada in 1886.

During the 20th and 21st centuries Sioux population has rebounded, reaching 207,456 people reporting Sioux ancestry in the USA according to the 2018 American Community Survey. In the 2010 census 112,176 people reported being full-blood Sioux (in addition 4,301 more reported being full-blood Natives, but tribally mixed) and in the 2020 census at least 108,855 people reported being full-blood Sioux.

== Notable Sioux ==
=== Historical ===
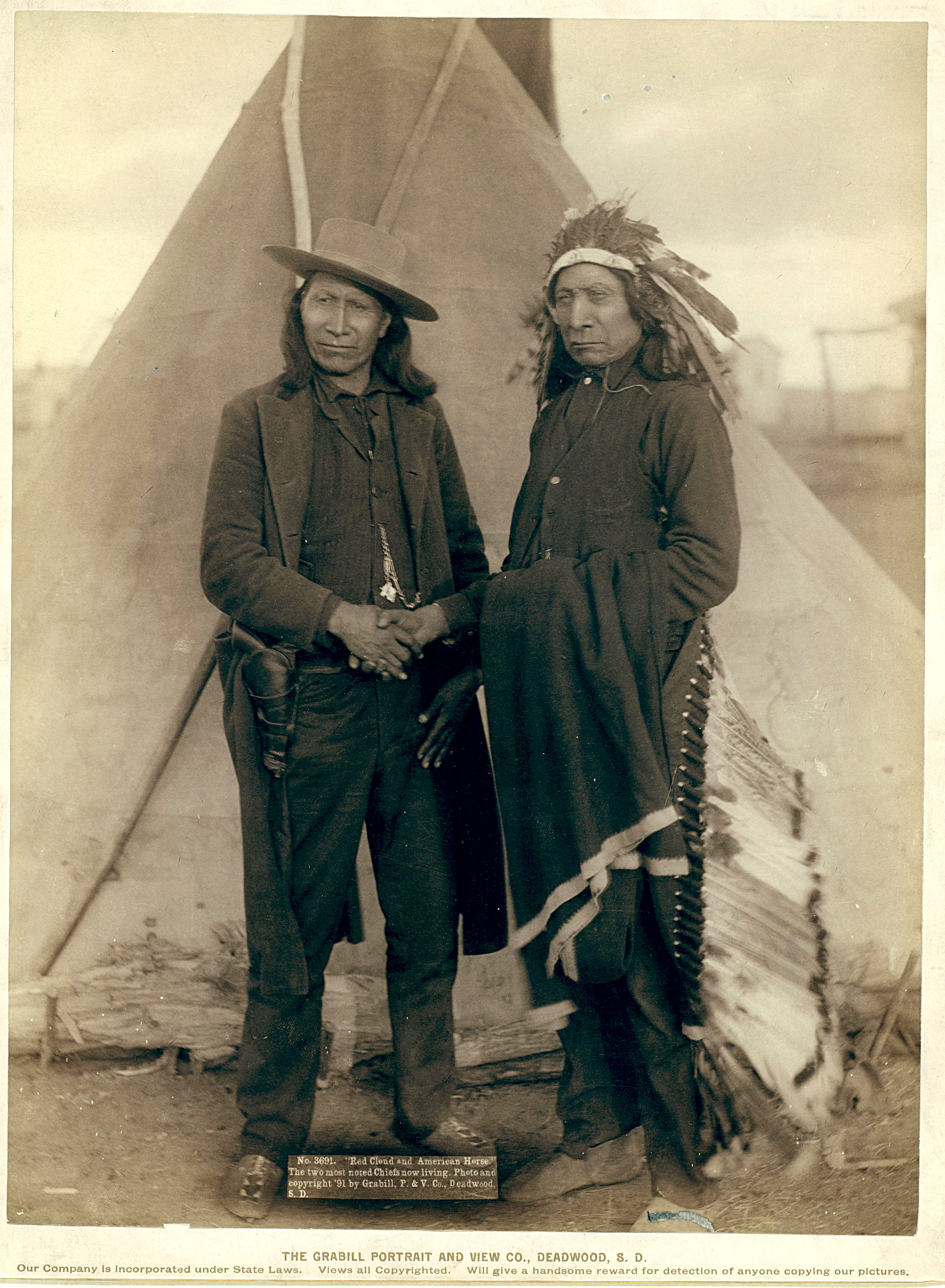
Chiefs Red Cloud and American Horse (1891)

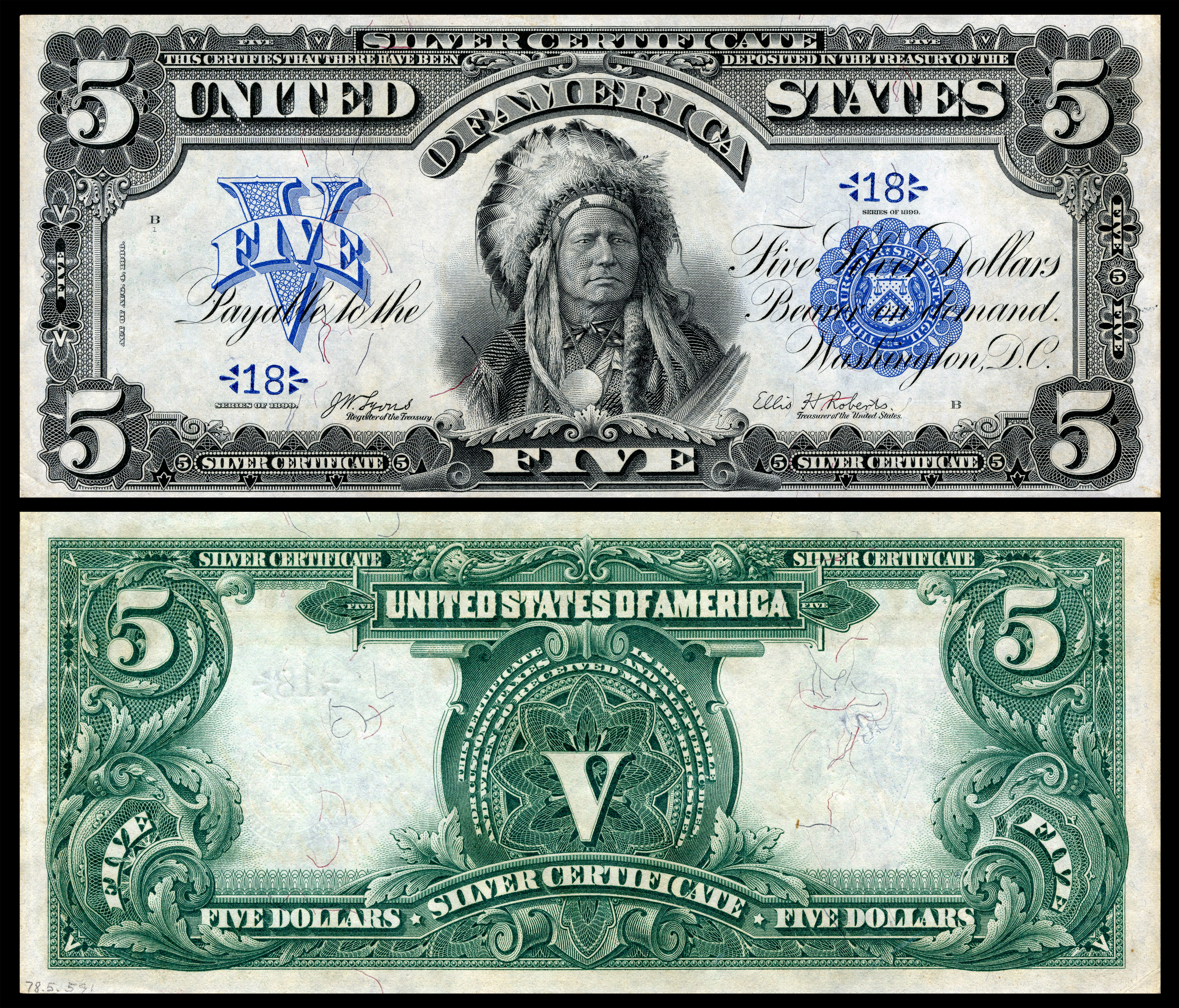
Running Antelope, a Hunkpapa Lakota Chief, depicted on the US 1899 $5 silver certificate.

- Šóta (Old Chief Smoke) — an original Oglala Lakota head chief
- Siŋté Glešká (Spotted Tail) — Sicangu (Brulé) chief who resisted joining Red Cloud's War
- Thaóyate Dúta (Little Crow/His Red Nation) — Mdewakanton Dakota chief and warrior
- Tȟatȟáŋka Íyotake (Sitting Bull) — Famous Hunkpapa Lakota chief and holy man
- Tȟašúŋke Witkó (Crazy Horse) — Famous Oglala Lakota warrior
- Maȟpíya Ičáȟtagye (Touch the Clouds) – Minneconjou Lakota chief and warrior
- Maȟpíya Lúta (Red Cloud) — Famous Oglala Lakota chief and spokesperson
- Heȟáka Sápa (Black Elk) — Famous Oglala Lakota medicine and holy man
- Ité Omáǧažu (Rain-in-the-Face) — Hunkpapa Lakota war chief
- Tȟáȟča Hušté (Lame Deer) — Mineconju Lakota holy man and spiritual preserver
- Wí Sápa (Black Moon) — Miniconjou Lakota chief
- Matȟó Héȟloǧeča (Hollow Horn Bear) — Sicangu Lakota leader
- Phizí (Gall) — Hunkpapa Lakota war chief
- Ógle Lúta (Red Shirt) — Oglala Lakota warrior and chief
- Inkpáduta (Scarlet Point/Red End) — Wahpekute Dakota war chief
- Waŋbdí Tháŋka (Big Eagle) — Mdewakanton Dakota chief
- Tamaha (One Eye/Standing Moose) — Mdewekanton Dakota scout for the U.S. during War of 1812
- Óta Kté (Luther Standing Bear/Plenty Kill) — Oglala Lakota writer and actor
- Núŋp Kaȟpá (Two Strike) — Sicangu Lakota chief
- Čhetáŋ Sápa (Black Hawk) — Itázipčho Lakota ledger artist
- Tȟatȟóka Íŋyaŋke (Running Antelope) — Hunkpapa Lakota chief
- Matȟó Watȟákpe (John Grass/Charging Bear) — Sihasapa Lakota chief
- Tȟatȟáŋka Ská (White Bull) — Miniconjou Lakota warrior and nephew of Sitting Bull
- Waŋblí Kté (Kill Eagle) — Sihasapa Lakota warrior and leader
- Šúŋkawakȟáŋ Tȟó (Blue Horse) — Oglala chief, warrior, educator, and statesman
- Matȟó Wayúhi (Conquering Bear) — Sičháŋǧu Lakota chief
- Čhetáŋ Kiŋyáŋ (Flying Hawk) — Oglala Lakota chief, philosopher, and historian
- Matȟó Wanáȟtake (Kicking Bear) — Oglala born Miniconjou Lakota warrior and chief
- Uŋpȟáŋ Glešká (Spotted Elk/Big Foot) — Miniconjou Lakota chief
- Hé Waŋžíča (Lone Horn) — Miniconjou Lakota chief
- Kȟaŋǧí Yátapi (Crow King/Medicine Bag That Burns) — Hunkpapa Lakota war chief
- Wičháša Tȟáŋkala (Little Big Man/Charging Bear) — Oglala Lakota warrior
- Šúŋka Khúčiyela (Low Dog) — Oglala Lakota chief and warrior
- Wašíčuŋ Tȟašúŋke (American Horse) ("The Younger") — Oglala Lakota chief
- Wašíčuŋ Tȟašúŋke (American Horse) ("The Elder") — Oglala Lakota chief
- Tȟašúŋke Kȟokípȟapi (Young Man Afraid Of His Horses) — Oglala Lakota chief
- Ištáȟba (Sleepy Eye) — Sisseton Dakota chief
- Ohíyes’a (Charles Eastman) — Author, physician, and reformer
- Colonel Gregory "Pappy" Boyington — World War II fighter ace and Medal of Honor recipient; 1/4 Sioux
- Charging Thunder (1877–1929), Blackfoot Sioux chief who was part of Buffalo Bill's Wild West Show in 1903, but remained in England when the show returned to America. He married Josephine, an American horse trainer who had just given birth to their first child, Bessie, and together they settled in Darwen, before moving to Gorton. His name became George Edward Williams, after registering with the British immigration authorities to enable him to find work. Williams ended up working at the Belle Vue Zoo as an elephant keeper. He died from pneumonia on July 28, 1929. His interment was at Gorton's cemetery.
- Ziŋtkála-Šá (Gertrude Simmons Bonnin) — Author, educator, musician, and political activist

=== Contemporary ===
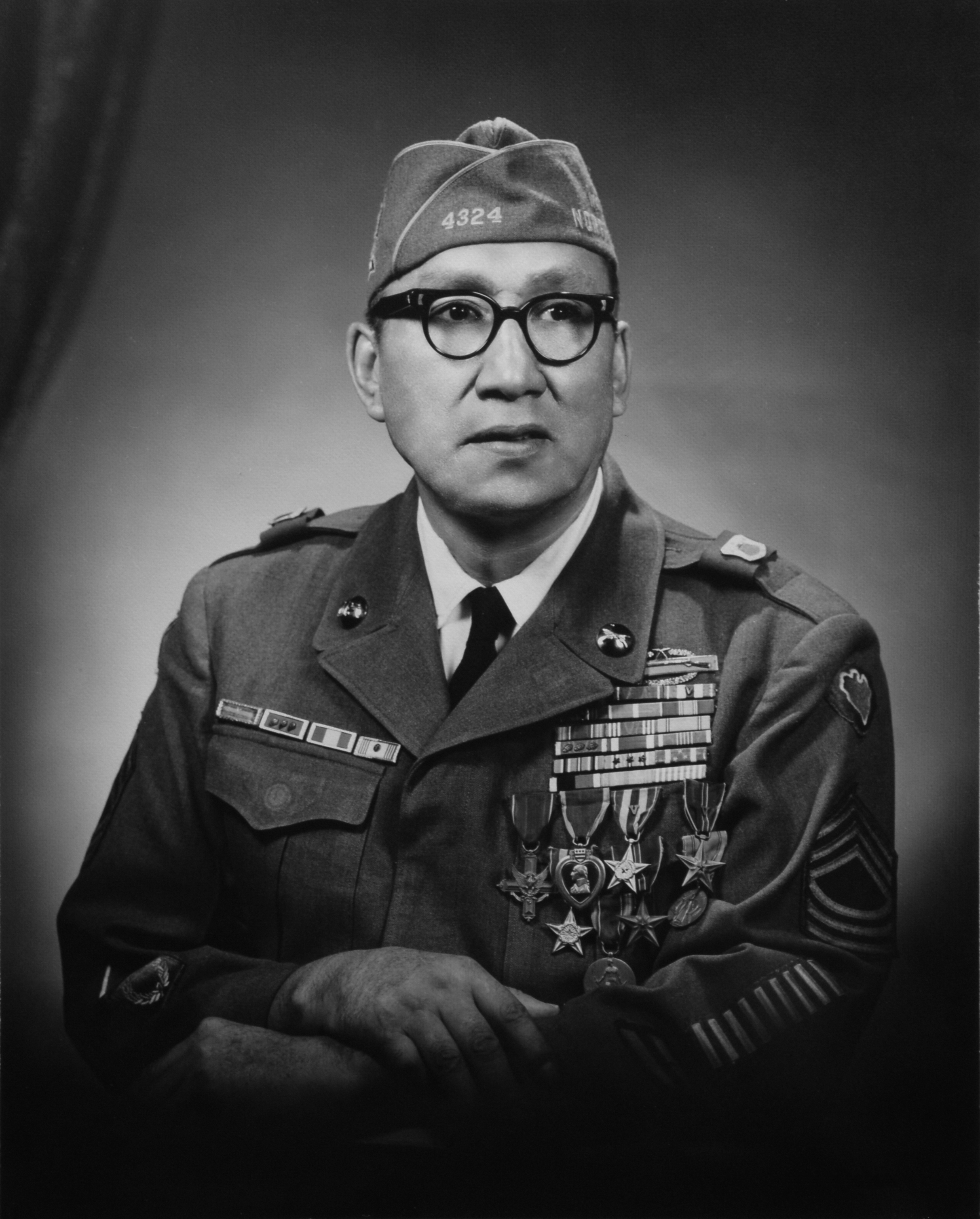
Woodrow Keeble, Medal of Honor recipient.

Contemporary Sioux people are listed under the tribes to which they belong.

- Category:Sioux people
- Lakota

- Hunkpapa
- Oglala
- Sicangu

- Dakota people

- Sisseton Wahpeton Oyate of the Lake Traverse Indian Reservation

==== By individual tribe ====
- Assiniboine and Sioux Tribes of the Fort Peck Indian Reservation
- Cheyenne River Sioux Tribe of the Cheyenne River Reservation
- Crow Creek Sioux Tribe of the Crow Creek Reservation
- Flandreau Santee Sioux Tribe
- Lower Brule Sioux Tribe of the Lower Brule Reservation
- Rosebud Sioux Tribe of the Rosebud Indian Reservation
- Shakopee Mdewakanton Sioux Community
- Sisseton Wahpeton Oyate
- Standing Rock Sioux Tribe of North & South Dakota
- Yankton Sioux Tribe of South Dakota
- Spirit Lake Dakota Tribe
