= 2nd Cavalry Regiment (United States) =

Cavalry regiment of the United States Army

- Shoulder sleeve insignia
- Founded: 1836
- Country: United States
- Branch: United States Army
- Type: Armored cavalry
- Role: Mechanized infantry
- Size: Regiment
- Part of: V Corps: U.S. Army Europe and Africa
- Garrison/HQ: Rose Barracks, Vilseck, Germany
- Nickname: Second Dragoons
- Motto: Toujours Prêt (Always Ready)
- Engagements: Indian Wars; Battle of the Caloosahatchee; Mexican–American War; American Civil War; Spanish–American War; Philippine–American War; World War I; World War II; Operation Cowboy; Persian Gulf War; Battle of 73 Easting; Operation Uphold Democracy; Bosnian War; Global War on Terrorism; Iraq War; War in Afghanistan

Commanders
- Commander: Col. Timothy A. Price
- Command Sergeant Major: Command Sgt. Maj. Jesse J. Clark
- Notable commanders: William S. Harney; Henry Hopkins Sibley; David E. Twiggs; John K. Herr; Edwin B. Winans; John T. Cole; Albert Sidney Johnston; Philip St. George Cooke; Joseph T. Dickman; Harry Chamberlin; Creighton Abrams; David M. Maddox; John H. Tilelli Jr.; Don Holder; Walter L. Sharp

Insignia
- Regimental distinctive insignia

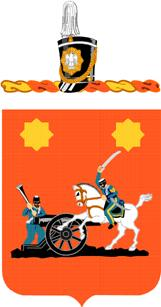
- Coat of arms

- Combat service identification badge

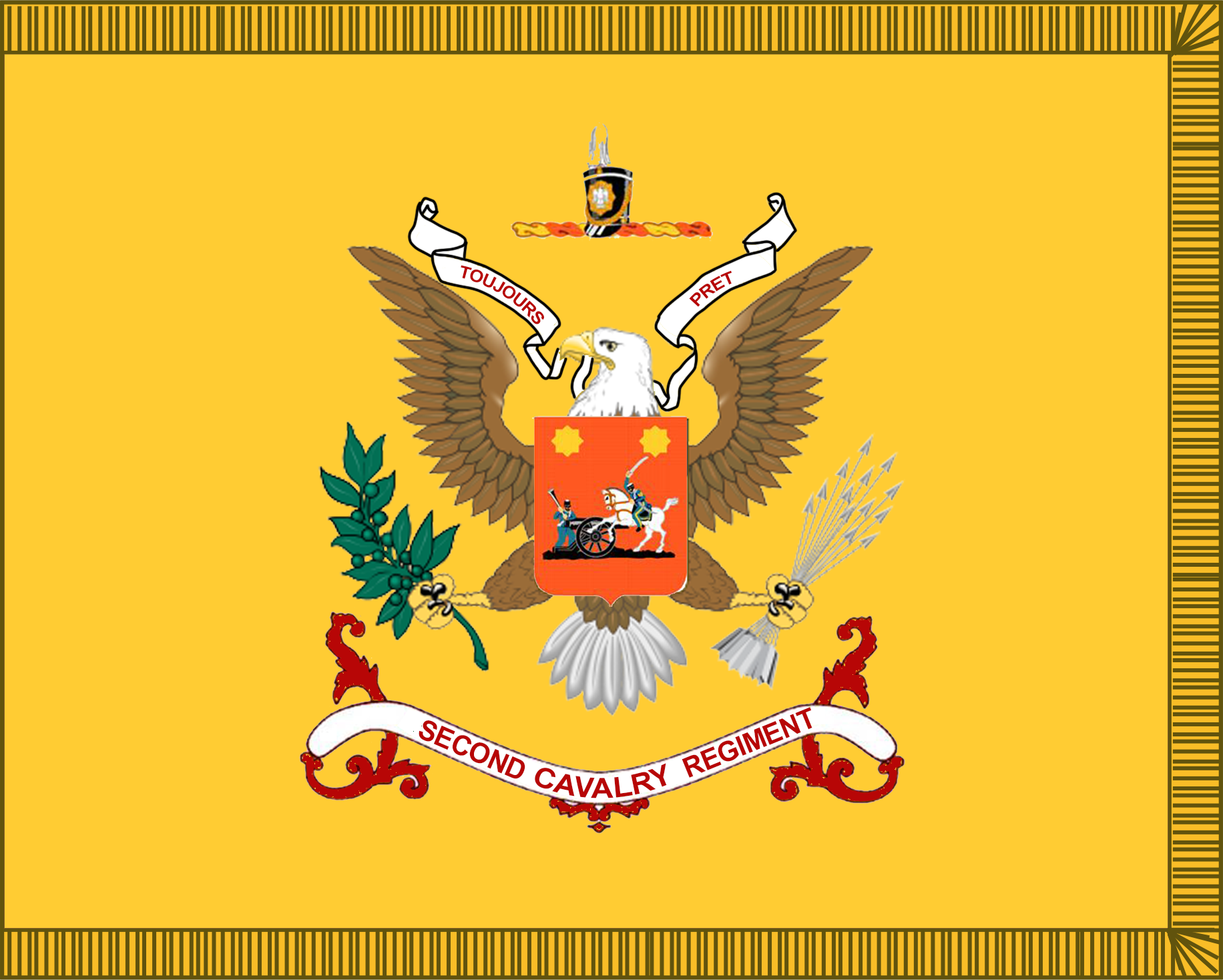
- 2nd Cavalry Regiment Flag

The 2nd Cavalry Regiment, also known as the Second Dragoons, is an active Stryker infantry and cavalry regiment of the United States Army. The Second Cavalry Regiment is a unit of the United States Army Europe and Africa, with its garrison at the Rose Barracks in Vilseck, Germany. It can trace its lineage back to the early part of the 19th century.

== Previous names and dates ==
Previous designations of the regiment:

- 2nd Regiment of Dragoons (May 1836 – March 1843, April 1844 – August 1861);
- 2nd Regiment of Riflemen (March 1843 – April 1844);
- 2nd US Cavalry Regiment (August 1861 – July 1942);
- 2nd Cavalry Regiment (Mechanized) (January 1943 – December 1943);
- 2nd Cavalry Group (Mechanized) (December 1943 – July 1946);
- 2nd Constabulary Regiment (July 1946 – November 1948);
- 2nd Armored Cavalry Regiment (November 1948 – July 1992);
- 2nd Armored Cavalry Regiment (Light) (July 1992 – March 2005);
- 2nd Cavalry Regiment (March 2005 – June 2006);
- 2nd Stryker Cavalry Regiment (June 2006 – July 2011);
- 2nd Cavalry Regiment (July 2011 – present).

== Motto and heraldry ==
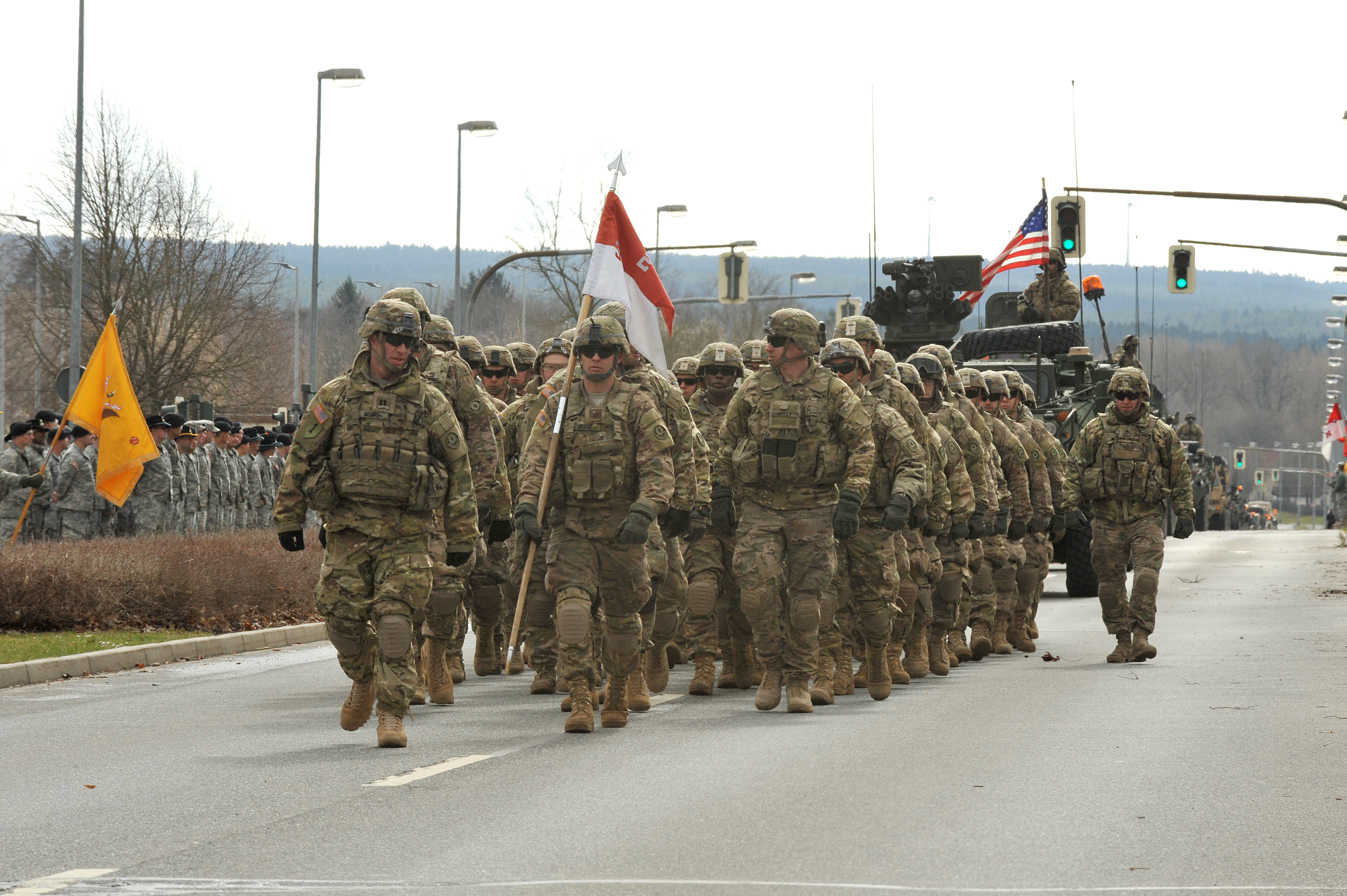
Soldiers of 3rd Squadron, 2nd Cavalry Regiment parade through Rose Barracks in Vilseck, Germany during Operation Atlantic Resolve in April 2015

=== Coat of arms ===
Description/Blazon

Shield;

Tenné, a dragoon in the uniform of the Mexican War mounted on a white horse brandishing a saber and charging a Mexican field gun defended by a gunner armed with a rammer all proper, in chief two eight-pointed mullets Or.

Crest;

On a wreath of the colors (Or and Tenné) the head dress of the dragoons of 1836 Proper. Motto Toujours Prêt (Always Ready).

Symbolism

The color of the facings of the old dragoon regiment was orange, which is used for the field of the shield; the insignia was an eight-pointed star of gold, two of them (conforming with the numerical designation) are placed on the shield. The traditional episode in the regiment is the charge of Captain May's squadron on the Mexican artillery at Resaca de la Palma which is commemorated by the principal charge on the shield.

Background

The coat of arms was originally approved for the 2d Cavalry Regiment on 6 August 1920. It was amended to change the 6 pointed stars to 8 pointed stars to conform to the old dragoon star on 28 April 1924. The coat of arms was redesignated for the 2d Cavalry Reconnaissance Squadron on 31 July 1944. On 26 November 1946, it was redesignated for the 2d Constabulary Squadron. It was redesignated for the 2d Armored Cavalry Regiment (US Constabulary) on 17 March 1949. The coat of arms was redesignated for the 2d Armored Cavalry on 1 September 1955. The insignia was redesignated effective 16 April 2005, for the 2d Cavalry Regiment.

=== Distinctive unit insignia ===
Description/Blazon

A metal and enamel device one inch (2.54 cm) in height consisting of a gold eight pointed star of rays surmounted by a green palmetto leaf charged with a silver color fleur-de-lis, on a green ribbon scroll forming the base of the device, the regimental motto "Toujours Prêt" in gold metal letters.

Symbolism

The eight-pointed star insignia worn by dragoons, the 2d Cavalry having been originally formed as the Second Regiment of Dragoons in 1836. The palmetto leaf represents the Regiment's first action against the Seminole Indians in Florida, where the palmetto leaf grows in abundance. The fleur-de-lis is for combat service in France in both World War I and World War II. The motto "Toujours Prêt" (Always Ready) expresses the spirit and élan of the Regiment.

Background

The distinctive unit insignia was originally approved for the 2d Cavalry Regiment on 16 January 1923. The insignia was amended to change the 6 pointed star to an 8 pointed star to conform to the old dragoon star on 28 April 1924. On 23 March 1931, it was amended to prescribe the method of wear. It was redesignated for the 2d Constabulary Squadron on 21 January 1948. The insignia was redesignated for the 2d Armored Cavalry Regiment (US Constabulary) on 17 March 1949. It was redesignated for the 2d Armored Cavalry Regiment on 1 September 1955. The distinctive unit insignia was amended to change the description on 20 August 1965. It was redesignated effective 16 April 2005, for the 2d Cavalry Regiment.

== History ==
=== Between 1808 and 1815 ===
In 1808, there was one regiment of light dragoons in the United States and during the War of 1812 another regiment was raised. Units of both regiments of dragoons served in engagements at the Mississineway River; the Battle of Lundy's Lane; Fort Erie and the Siege of Fort Meigs. These two regiments were consolidated on 30 March 1814 into the Regiment of Light Dragoons but this new unit was dissolved on 15 June 1815.

=== Early organization ===
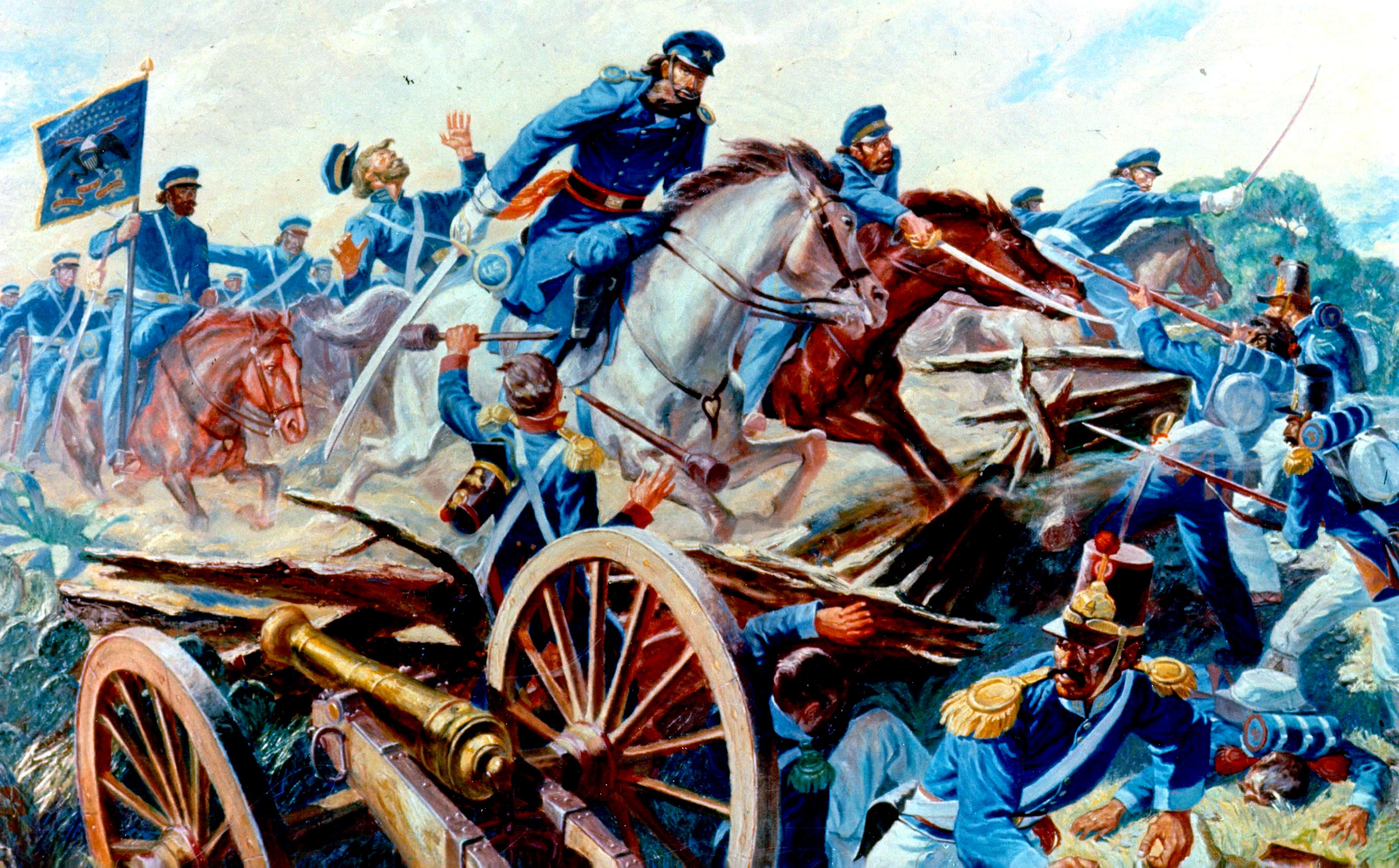
Resaca de la Palma, Texas, 9 May 1846. Here Captain Charles A. May's squadron of the 2d Dragoons (now 2d Armored Cavalry Regiment) slashed through the enemy lines in an attack that climaxed the opening campaigns of the Mexican War. Their bravery proved that the 2,500 American soldiers under Zachary Taylor had enough self-confidence and pluck to shatter the Mexican force of 6,000 and eject it forever from Texas. May's attack order was simple and effective: "Remember your regiment and follow your officers."

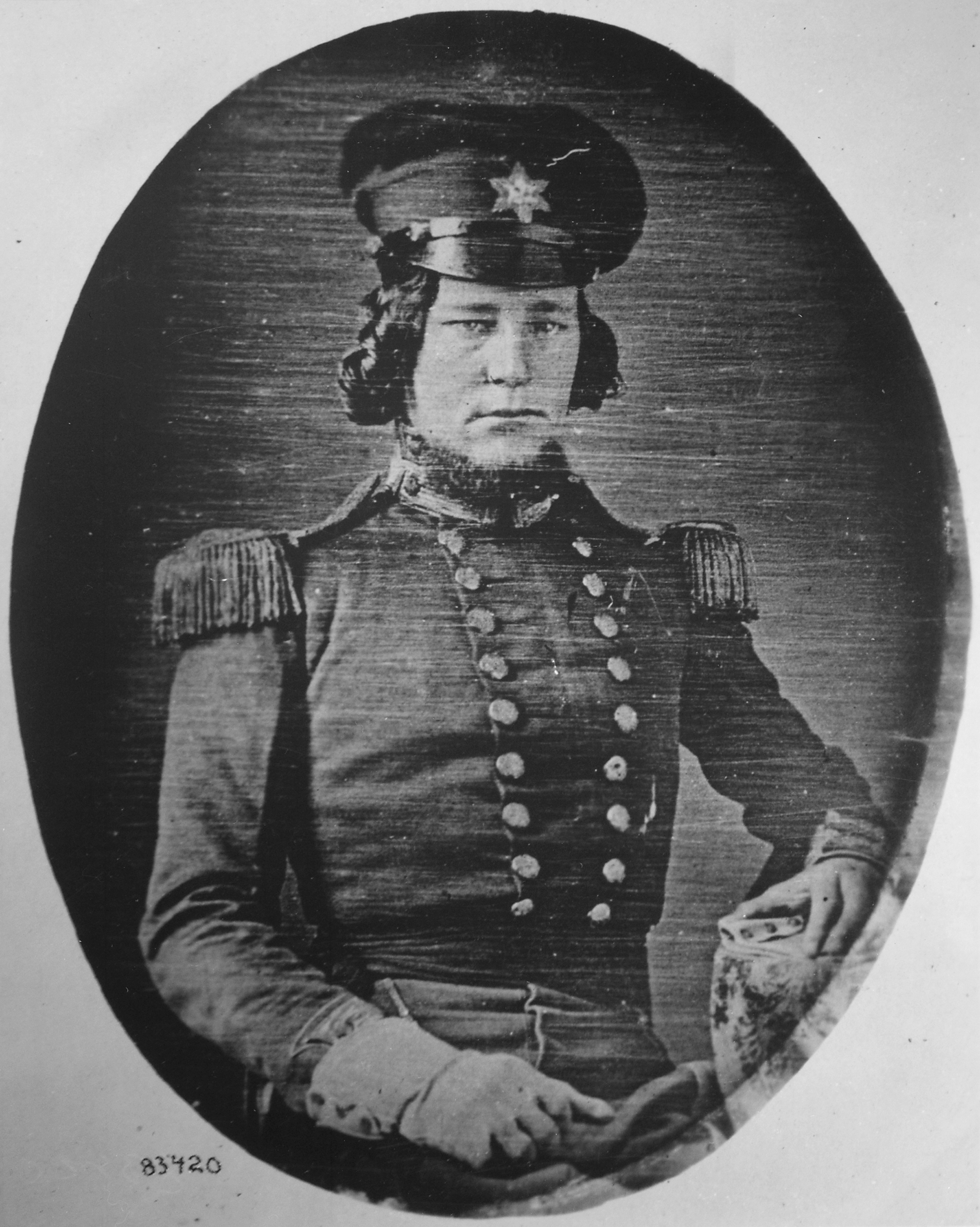
Bezaleel W. Armstrong, second lieutenant, 2nd Dragoons, 1846; served in the Mexican War at Vera Cruz and Mexico City, 1847–48; died 1849, aged 26, daguerreotype c. 1846.

The precursor organization was originally established by President Andrew Jackson on 23 May 1836, as the Second Regiment of Dragoons of the US Army. A and I Companies were recruited in the Fort Myer, Virginia area, B Company recruited from Virginia and Louisiana, C Company drew recruits from Tennessee, E, F, G, and H recruited from New York, and K Company was drawn from New Orleans. D Company was organized from a detachment of the 1st Dragoons and served in Florida immediately. In April 1837, the regimental headquarters was moved to Jefferson Barracks, Missouri, where the 400 new recruits and their instructors participated in the School of the Trooper, and learned the tactics and ways of being a dragoon, while some of their compatriots were battling the Indians in Florida.

==== Second Seminole War ====
The 2nd Dragoons saw their first combat during the Second Seminole War. The 2nd Dragoons brought the fight to the hostile Seminoles, rather than wait to be attacked inside a fort like other units did. Company D drew first blood on 10 June 1836 in an engagement at Welika Pond, close to Fort Defiance, Florida. In December 1836, A, B, C, E, and I Companies arrived in South Carolina, and immediately moved south. In January 1837, the troopers were engaged by the Seminoles at Fort Mellon only two days after their arrival. On 9 September 1837, three Dragoon companies and two companies of Florida Militia surrounded and raided a hostile village, capturing King Philip, an important chief. On 11 September 1837, Lieutenant John Winfield Scott McNeil was killed by the Seminoles, becoming the first officer of the 2nd Dragoons to die in combat. The regiment under Lieutenant Colonel William S. Harney later fought at the Second Battle of the Loxahatchee on 24 January 1838. The 2nd Dragoons would suffer a major defeat at the Battle of the Caloosahatchee on 23 July 1839.

=== Mexican–American War ===
Under an act of Congress dated 23 August 1842 the regiment was re-designated as the Regiment of Riflemen effective 4 March 1843. This act was repealed on 4 April 1844 and the regiment reverted to its previous designation.

In October 1842, A, D, E, F, and G Companies moved to Fort Jessup, Louisiana and Fort Towson. The remainder of the regiment stayed in Florida to patrol for hostile bands of Seminoles. Fort Jessup became the regimental headquarters, and was the 2nd Dragoons' home for four years. When hostilities with the Centralist Republic of Mexico began to boil over in 1845, General Zachary Taylor assembled his "Army of Observation" at Fort Jessup, and the 2nd Dragoons marched overland to occupy Corpus Christi, Texas.

They soon established Fort Texas, near modern-day Brownsville, Texas. The regiment conducted aggressive patrolling along the Rio Grande, and on 25 April 1846, they received word that Mexican troops were crossing the river. Two companies of the 2nd Dragoons were ambushed by 500–1,600 Mexican troops (accounts vary), and all were either killed or captured. This battle, known as the Thornton Affair, gave US President Polk the casus belli he needed to invade Mexico.

When General Taylor counterattacked, the 2nd Dragoons forced the enemy to turn their flank during the Battle of Palo Alto. The next day, during the Battle of Resaca de la Palma on 9 May 1846, Companies D and E under Captain Charles A. May were ordered to eliminate a battery of Mexican guns. Prior to the charge, May issued a simple order; "Remember your Regiment and follow your officers." This became the 2nd Dragoon Regiment's motto. The attack destroyed the enemy battery and captured a Mexican general.

On 29 June 1846, COL David Twiggs was given command of the regiment from COL William S. Harney, and he was lauded for his bravery at the Battle of Monterrey. COL Twiggs commanded the 2nd Dragoons for the rest of the war, and by the end, the regiment was one of two regiments in the Army that had elements participate in every major battle.

Heroism was not limited to the officers of the 2nd Dragoons; in November 1847, SGT Jack Miller's small patrol of 20 Dragoons was ambushed by near Monclova by 100 Mexicans. Reaching for their carbines, SGT Miller urged them to charge with only their sabers. In the ensuing battle, 6 Mexicans were killed, 13 were wounded, and 70 were captured at the cost of 1 wounded Dragoon and 3 wounded horses.

=== Frontier duty ===
After the Mexican–American War, the 2nd Dragoons headed west to protect the settlers on the new frontier that had just been gained by the United States in the Treaty of Guadalupe Hidalgo. In June 1849, F Company, under MAJ Ripley Arnold, established Fort Worth along the Trinity River. These years were spent patrolling the frontier in order to protect American settlers heading west from hostile Indians. In 1854, the Companies E and K of the regiment defeated a sizable Sioux force in the Battle of Ash Hollow in Nebraska, forcing the Sioux to sign a peace treaty.

In late 1857, in response to growing hostilities between federal authorities and Mormon settlers in Utah, a battalion of the 2nd Dragoons was sent to quell any Mormon resistance to federal power. These Dragoons, under LTC Philip St. George Cooke, joined a 2,500-man expedition and began the march to Utah, and in response, Brigham Young, the Mormon leader, mobilized the Nauvoo Legion to combat this force. Peace talks succeeded before much blood was shed, but the 2nd Dragoons still had to complete a long and arduous winter march across the frontier. The Utah War ended in July 1858. On 14 June 1858, William S. Harney was promoted to Brigadier General, and LTC St. George Cooke was made the 3rd Colonel of the 2nd Dragoons.

On 1 October 1858, other elements of the 2nd Dragoons that hadn't gone to Utah were engaging in operations against the Comanche in Texas. In the summer of 1858, a group of Dragoons pursued a number of Comanche who had captured a white child, but soon were ambushed by 25 braves. The firefight escalated and the Dragoons and Texas Rangers fought off a band of roughly 500 Comanches, and killed 70 after five hours of fighting. The captured child was rescued in the end, and the engagement became known as the Battle of the Wichita Village.

=== Civil War ===
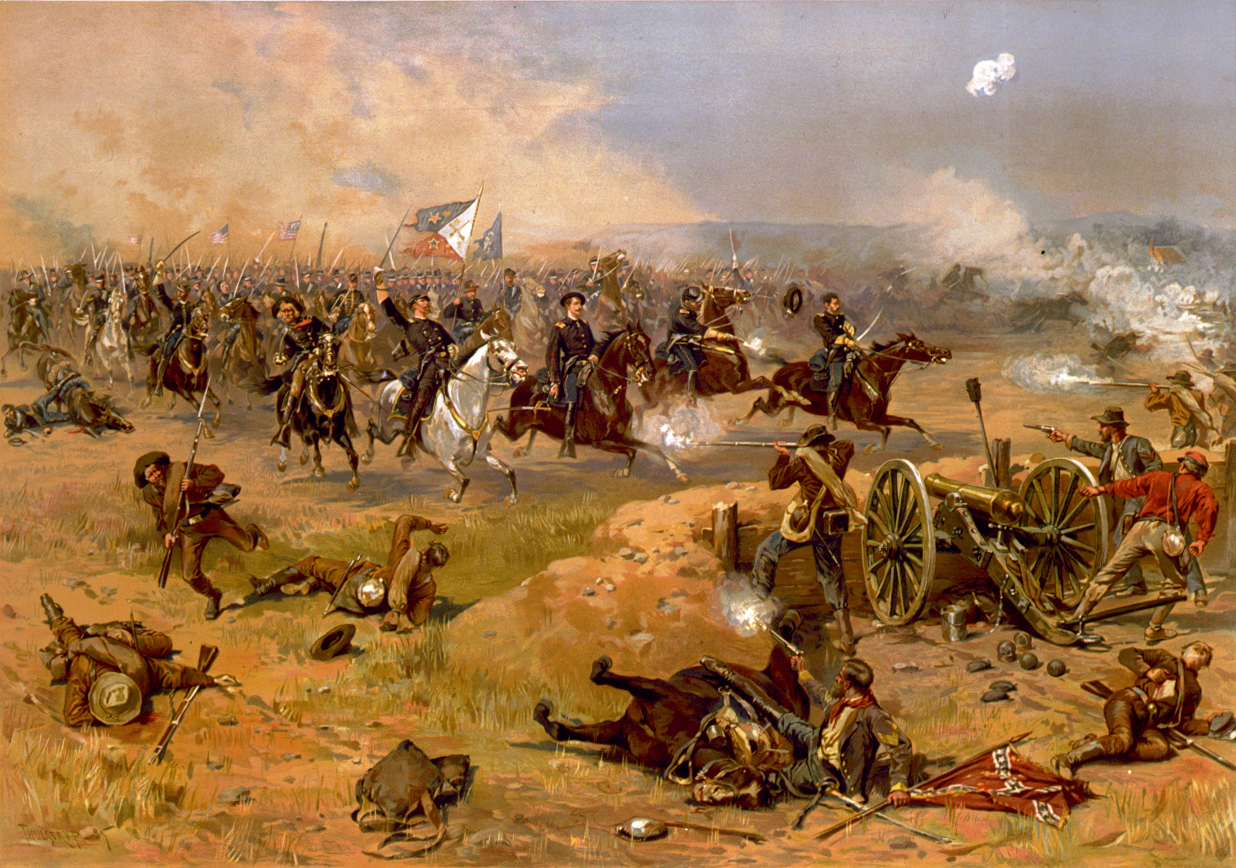
The final charge at the Third Battle of Winchester.

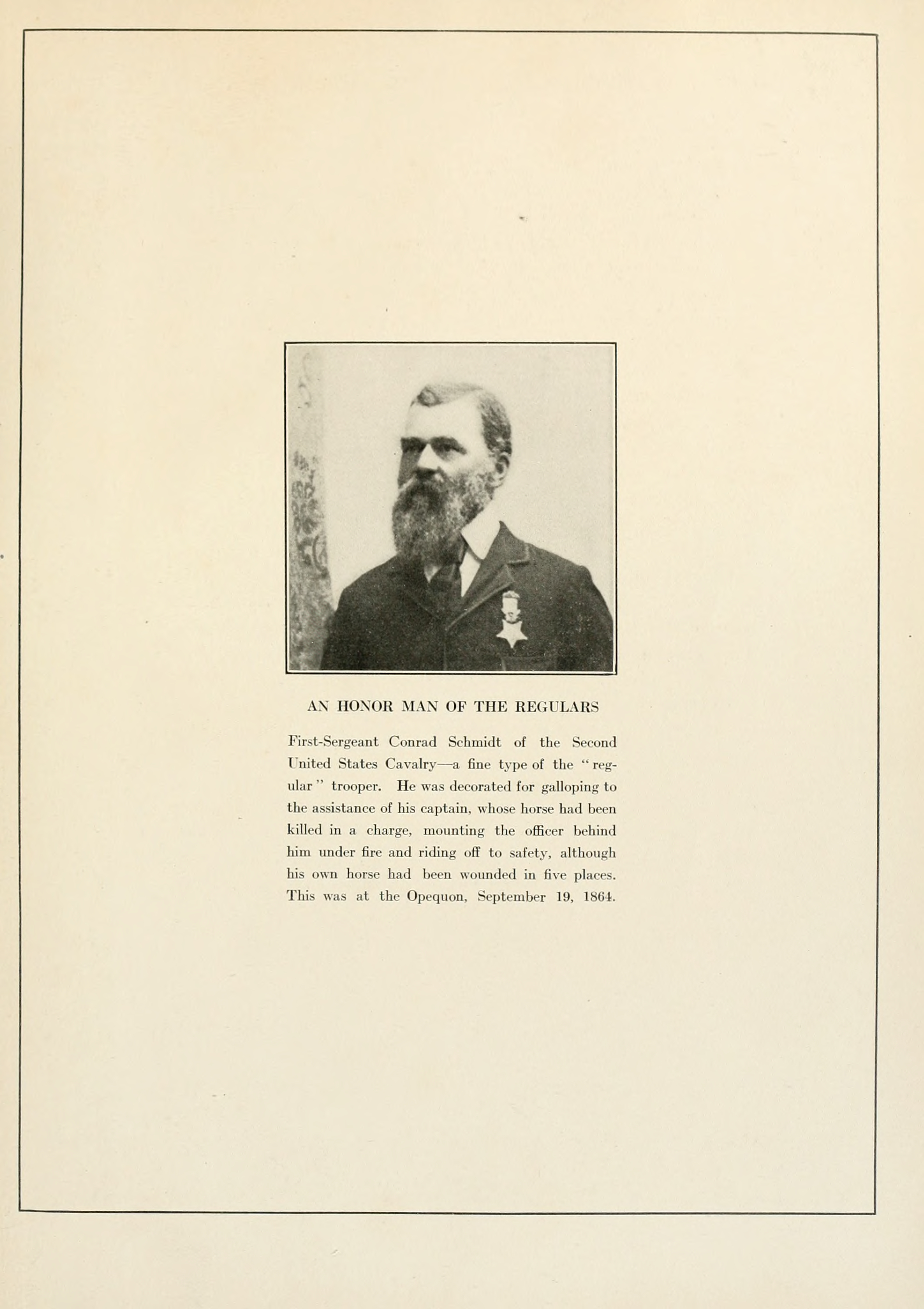
Sgt Conrad Schmidt

At the onset of the Civil War in 1861, the regiment was recalled to the Eastern theater and redesignated on 3 August 1861 as the Second Cavalry Regiment. Thomas J. Wood was named the fourth Colonel of the regiment, but was promoted out of the job shortly after. Throughout the war, the 2nd Cavalry would be commanded by many company-grade officers such as Captains Wesley Merritt and Theophilus Francis Rodenbough. C Company was the last unit of the regiment to fight as dragoons, during the Battle of Wilson's Creek.

For much of the war, the regiment was a key part of either the "Reserve Brigade" or the "Regular Brigade" of the Cavalry Corps of the Army of the Potomac and served in numerous campaigns and battles. They fought in numerous battles, including the Siege of Yorktown, the Second Battle of Bull Run, the Battle of Antietam, the Battle of Fredericksburg, the Battle of Chancellorsville, the Battle of Gettysburg, the Battle of Spotsylvania Court House, and the Battle of Cold Harbor.

During the Battle of Fredericksburg in December 1862, SGT Martin Hagan of the 2nd Cavalry and a small group of troopers held a Confederate cavalry brigade at bay, covering the Union retreat across the river. This action was completed without the loss of a man or a horse, and SGT Hagan was awarded the regiment's first Medal of Honor. The 2nd Cavalry was also present during the Stoneman Raid just prior to the Battle of Chancellorsville. This raid is regarded as the "resurgence of the Union Cavalry."

During the Battle of Kelly's Ford, the 2nd Cavalry became the first Union cavalry regiment to engage Confederate General J.E.B. Stuart's cavalry in a head-to-head charge. This action hurt Stuart's reputation in the eyes of Southern leadership, just three weeks before the Battle of Gettysburg. Leading up to the Battle of Gettysburg, the 2nd Cavalry fought a continuous recon and counter-recon with Stuart's cavalry until the two armies met at Gettysburg, Pennsylvania. Here, the regiment dismounted and skirmished the Confederates in a delaying action until the main Union force could reach the battlefield.

During the Battle of Trevilian Station in June 1864, the 2nd Cavalry Regiment charged the Confederate Cavalry and smashed their lines. CPT T.F. Rodenbough led the charge and was wounded, and earned the Medal of Honor for his heroism in this brief but savage charge. Returning to duty in September 1864, he led the regiment in another charge during the Third Battle of Winchester. He was wounded again and lost his mount and right arm. First Sergeant Conrad Schmidt of K Company bravely rode back under fire to rescue his regimental commander. Schmidt was given the Medal of Honor for his swift and courageous action.

On 9 October 1864, the 2nd Cavalry, as part of the reserve brigade of the 1st Cavalry Division, the regiment attacked the flanks of the Confederate line, forcing them to retreat. During this action, PVT Edward Hanson of H Company earned the Medal of Honor for braving enemy fire to capture the flag of the 32nd Virginia Cavalry. The 2nd Cavalry Regiment earned 14 battle streamers and 5 Medals of Honor during their Civil War service.

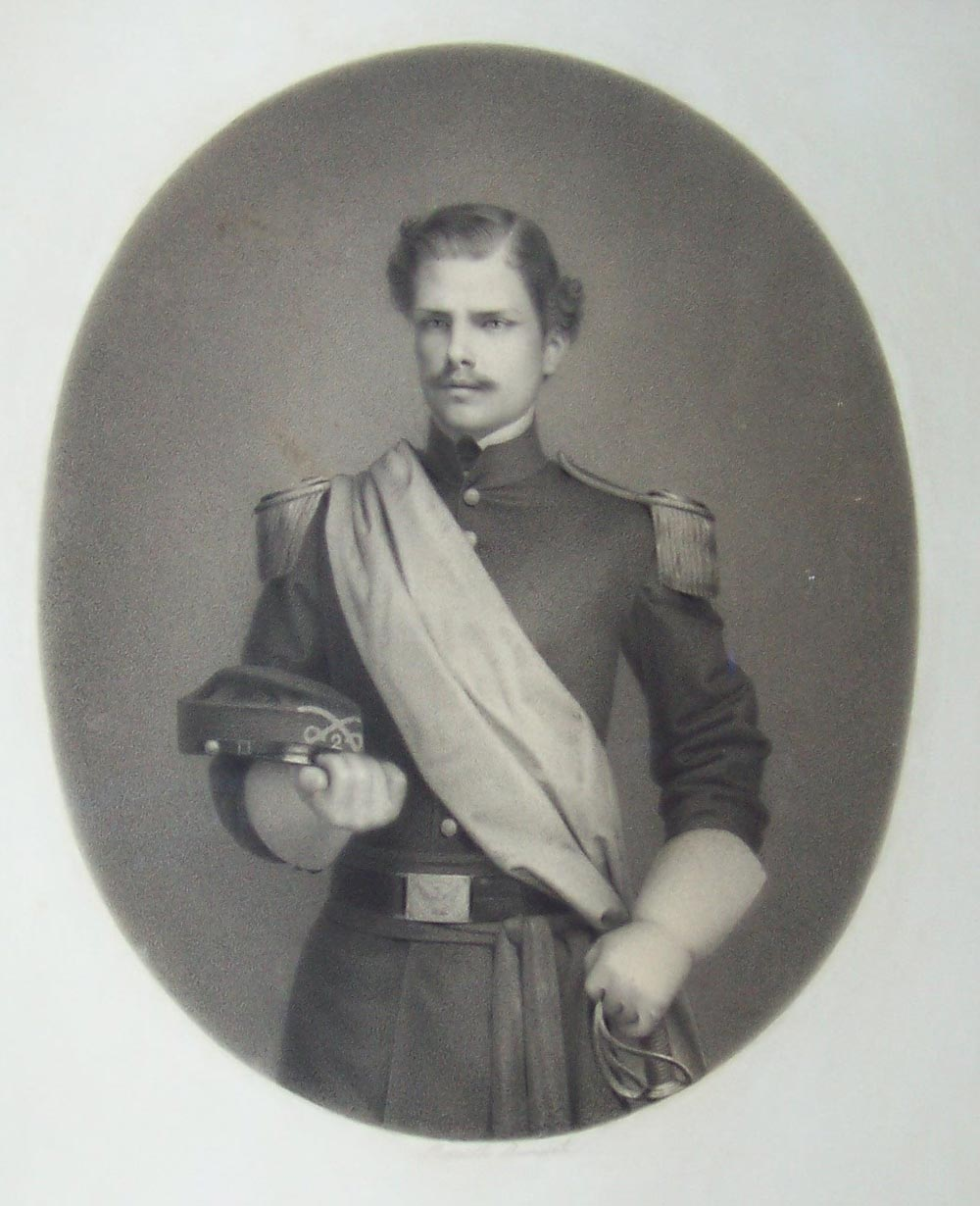
Lt William Orton Williams.

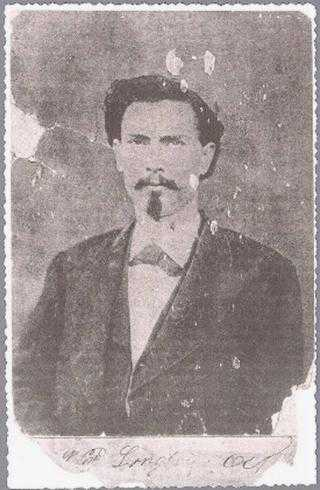
Pvt William Preston Longley Deserter from Company B 2nd Cavalry 1870-1872

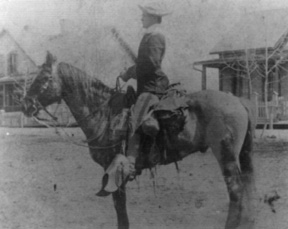
In 1895 Second Lieutenant Cornelius C. Smith, a Medal of Honor recipient, posed with his favorite horse, Blue, in front of his quarters while serving in the 2d Cavalry.

Like the other early mounted units, many members of the Second Cavalry went on to higher ranks and command positions on both sides during the war. A former lieutenant of the regiment, Colonel Orton Williams, C.S.A who had been commissioned into the regiment on the recommendation of Robert E. Lee, was hanged as a spy by the federal authorities in 1863.

=== Indian wars ===
When the Civil War ended, the 2nd Cavalry Regiment was sent west to fight against hostile Indian tribes and protect American settlers. With US troops focused on fighting Confederate forces in the east, the Indians of the frontier grew bolder. The vastness of the American frontier meant that the regiment was seldom together, and was spread out, often with only one troop occupying a post.

In December 1866, 25 troopers of the 2nd Cavalry under LT George W. Grummond accompanied CPT William J. Fetterman in his expedition against Chief Red Cloud. In northern Wyoming, these 81 men were engaged by a force of roughly 1,000 Indians, where they were all massacred in a desperate battle. On 29 June 1867, a small party of 10 troopers and 1 Indian scout under LT Lyman Kidder were ordered to take dispatches from General William Sherman to LTC George A. Custer.

Custer grew impatient and moved out ahead of schedule, and when LT Kidder's party arrived, they found the camp to be deserted. Making their way to Fort Wallace, the troopers were set upon by a band of Lakota and Cheyenne warriors near present-day Goodland, Kansas. The 12 cavalrymen and scout were surrounded and killed to a man, and their bodies were scalped and mutilated. However, they managed to kill an enemy chief, Yellow Horse, in the fight (known as the Kidder massacre).

On 23 January 1870, elements of Companies F, G, H, and L participated in the Marias Massacre in the Montana Territory, where 200 Piegan Blackfeet Indians were killed. After this massacre, Federal Indian policy changed under President Grant, and more peaceful solutions were sought. On 15 May 1870, SGT Patrick James Leonard was leading a party of 4 other troopers from C Company along the Little Blue River in Nebraska attempting to locate stray horses. A band of 50 Indians surrounded this detachment and the men raced for cover and made a fortified position with their two dead horses.

One trooper, PVT Thomas Hubbard, was wounded, but they managed to hold the Indians at bay and inflicted several casualties. When the hostile band retreated after an hour of fighting, the troopers left, took a settler family under their charge and returned safely. All 5 men were awarded the Medal of Honor (SGT Patrick J. Leonard, and PVTs Heth Canfield, Michael Himmelsback, Thomas Hubbard, and George W. Thompson). Today, junior NCOs in the 2nd Cavalry Regiment compete for the Sergeant Patrick James Leonard award.

On 17 March 1876, troopers from Companies E, I, and K (156 men) joined the 3rd US Cavalry Regiment under COL Joseph J. Reynolds to combat the Cheyenne and Lakota in the ill-fated Big Horn Expedition. During the Battle of Powder River, the cavalrymen attacked, but were repulsed, and the 2nd Cavalry lost 1 man killed and 5 wounded. 66 men also suffered from frostbite. The 2nd Cavalry was once again repulsed by the Cheyenne and Lakota at the Battle of the Rosebud on 17 June 1876, and only a few days later, Custer's 7th Cavalry were defeated at the Battle of Little Bighorn.

By April 1877, most of the US cavalry was in the west, fighting against bands of hostile Indians. The Cheyenne surrendered in December, Sitting Bull escaped to Canada, and Crazy Horse, the victorious chief in the Battles of the Rosebud and Little Bighorn, surrendered in April 1878. Chief Lame Deer was one of the last Lakota war-chiefs left resisting the US Government. The "Montana Battalion" of the 2nd Cavalry Regiment eventually caught up with his band near the Little Muddy Creek, Montana on 6 May 1878. After a midnight march, the troopers surprised Lame Deer's warriors at dawn on 7 May.

H Company charged the village and scattered the enemy horses, while the remaining troopers charged and routed the band of Lakota. During the intense battle, PVT William Leonard of L Company became isolated, and defended his position behind a large rock for two hours before he was rescued by his comrades. He, and PVT Samuel D. Phillips of H Company both earned the Medal of Honor for their gallantry in this battle. While searching the ruined village, the troopers found many uniforms, guidons, and weapons from the 7th Cavalry Regiment, and they left knowing that they had avenged those fallen at Little Bighorn.

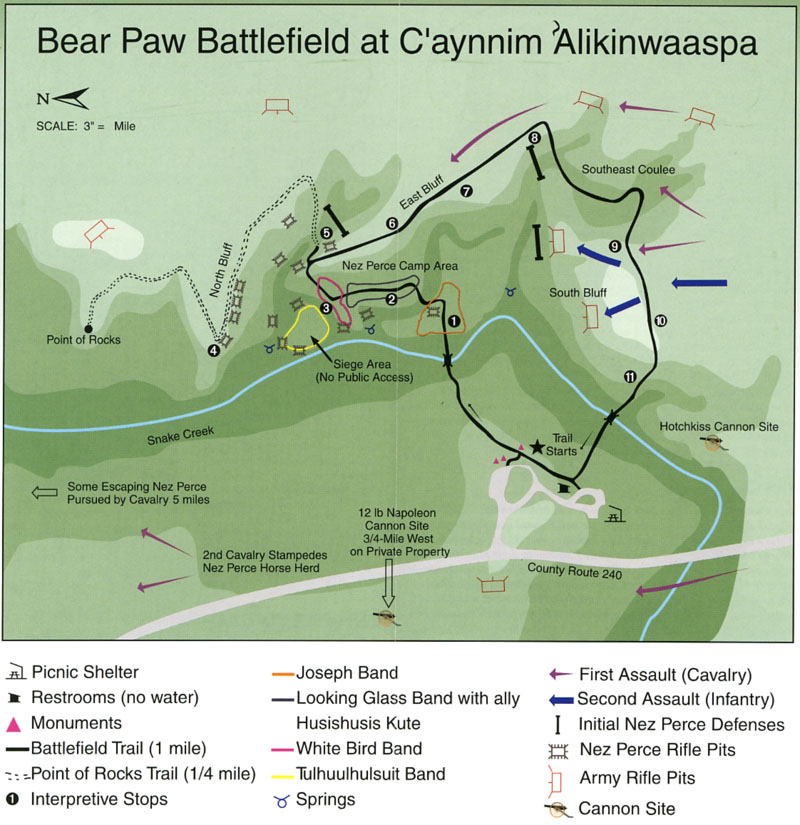
A map of Bear Paw Battlefield part of Nez Perce National Historical Park

On 20 August 1877, elements of the 2nd Cavalry which had been pursuing Chief Joseph's band of Nez Perce Indians through Idaho reported that their quarry had turned on them, stole their pack train, and began attempting to escape to Canada. Despite being low on supplies, L Troop and two additional Troops of the 1st Cavalry were dispatched to retrieve the pack train. After a hard ride, the Indians were overtaken and a fierce battle ensued.

CPL Harry Garland, wounded and unable to stand, continued to direct his men in the battle until the Indians withdrew. For his actions, he would receive the Medal of Honor along with three other men from L Troop; 1SG Henry Wilkens, PVT Clark, and Farrier William H. Jones. Today, the annual award for the most outstanding trooper in the 2nd Cavalry is called the Farrier Jones Award. On 18 September, a force of 600 men under General Oliver Otis Howard and Colonel Nelson A. Miles, including Troops F, G, and H of the 2nd Cavalry, marched to stop Chief Joseph's band from reaching Canada. L Troop was sent back to Fort Ellis to gather supplies but would join the expedition later.

On 30 September 1877, the Battle of Bear Paw Mountain began. The three Troops of 2nd Cavalry were dispatched to drive away the Indians' ponies by attacking their rear. G Troop, under LT Edward John McClernand, caught up with Chief White Bird as he and his band tried to escape to Canada. The ensuing engagement was brief, but violent, and resulted in the capture of the Indians and their mounts. Lt McClernand was awarded the Medal of Honor for his gallantry. After a four-day siege, Chief Joseph surrendered his band to General Howard on 4 October 1877.

In the fall of 1878, the 2nd Cavalry was posted in two forts in Montana; Fort Custer and Fort Keogh with the mission of preventing Chief Sitting Bull from returning to US territory after escaping to Canada. In early winter, Chiefs Dull Knife and Little Wolf left their reservations in Oklahoma and began moving northwards. Dull Knife was intercepted and surrendered at Fort Robinson, Nebraska, but Little Wolf sought shelter in the Sand Hills of Wyoming. Elements of E and I Troop under LT William P. Clark (who had earned a special rapport with the Indians) were sent to negotiate with these stalwarts.

The band was located near Box Elder Creek, Montana on 25 March 1879, and was persuaded to accompany the troopers back to Fort Keogh. During the march back, on 5 April, several Indians escaped and attacked the soldiers. SGT T.B. Glover took 10 men of B Troop and charged the numerically superior enemy, forcing them to surrender. SGT Glover received the Medal of Honor for this action. Chief Little Wolf eventually surrendered his band when the party returned to Fort Keogh.

In the winter of 1886, the 2nd Cavalry Regiment was charged with preventing Indians from crossing the border from Canada and protecting settlers in Montana and Wyoming. In early March 1887, a large band of Sioux entered Montana from Canada without warning, and C Troop from Camp Stambaugh, Wyoming and E Troop from Fort Sanders, Wyoming were sent to pursue them. After a 150-mile chase, the combatants met at O'Fallon's Creek, Montana. In the fierce battle that followed, the cavalrymen killed many braves and captured 46 of their horses.

CPT Eli L. Huggins and 2LT Lloyd M. Brett both earned the Medal of Honor during this battle for their intrepid leadership and courage. This action forced the Sioux to flee back to Canada. CPT Huggins became the 12th Colonel of the 2nd Cavalry, and today, the annual Regimental award for the most outstanding junior officer is named in honor of CPT Eli L. Huggins.

During the Indian Wars, the 2nd Cavalry Regiment earned 13 battle streamers to add to their flag, and 15 troopers received the Medal of Honor for their gallantry.

=== Spanish–American War ===
When the Spanish–American War began, the 2nd Cavalry Regiment was stationed in Kansas, Colorado, and New Mexico and assembled together in Georgia, the first time the entire regiment had been together since the Civil War. The troopers and horses of Troops A, C, D, and F boarded transports in Mobile, Alabama and set sail for Cuba, while the rest of the regiment traveled overland to Tampa, Florida. Due to a lack of transports, they served as logistical troops, and helped load units like Teddy Roosevelt's Rough Riders onto their ships. These four troops quickly found that they were the only horse-mounted cavalry units in Cuba, and soon began working for General William Rufus Shafter. Joining Teddy Roosevelt and the Rough Riders, the 2nd Cavalry fought at the Battle of El Caney, the Battle of San Juan Hill, the Battle of the Aguadores, and the Siege of Santiago. During the armistice period, the women and children of Santiago were sent out of the city and into American lines to a camp in El Caney. D Troop was in charge of feeding and policing these 22,000 refugees. B Troop was committed to the Puerto Rican Campaign in July and August 1898, but illness forced them to return to the US. In January 1899, the entire regiment began pacification duty in Cuba where they remained for three years, facilitating public education and improving the island's sanitation.

=== The Philippines and the Mexican Border ===
The 2nd Cavalry Regiment was sent to the Philippines during the Philippine-American War soon after their tenure in Cuba. From 23 January – 18 July 1905, they participated in the Cavite Campaign, working to root out insurgents and secure the surrounding countryside. On 14 February 1910, the troopers of the 2nd Cavalry fought in the Battle of Tiradores Hill on Mindanao island. Their next clashes were during the Moro Rebellion on Jolo island. They fought in the Battle of Mount Bagoak on 3 December 1911, and the Battle of Mount Vrut from 10 to 12 January 1912. The regiment continued patrolling and security operations until they arrived home in June 1912.

When they returned to the US in 1912, the 2nd Cavalry was sent to the border of Mexico to enforce border laws and prevent raids by banditos. The regiment's sector extended from El Paso, Texas all the way to Presidio, Texas, a stretch of 262 miles. The troopers were busily engaged in the duties of border surveillance and border security. In December 1913, the 2nd Cavalry was moved out of their post at Fort Bliss and sent to Fort Ethan Allen, Vermont to conduct maneuvers with several Army National Guard units. In 1914, troopers of the 2nd Cavalry were selected to represent the US Army in the annual horse show in Madison Square Garden in New York City.

=== World War I ===
The USA entered World War I on the side of the Allies on 6 April 1917. The 2nd Cavalry Regiment, while at Fort Ethan Allen, was split into thirds; one third remained as the 2nd Cavalry, and the other two became the 18th Cavalry Regiment and the 19th Cavalry Regiment. These "skeletons" of cadre were then recruited to full strength. Later in the year, the 18th Cavalry was redesignated as the 76th Field Artillery Regiment, and the 19th Cavalry was redesignated as the 77th Field Artillery Regiment. The 76th Field Artillery served with the 3rd Infantry Division during the war and their unit heraldry still bears the insignia of the 2nd Dragoons. The 77th Field Artillery served with distinction with the 4th Infantry Division.

General Pershing, the commander of the American Expeditionary Force, arrived in France on 26 June 1917, and 31 troopers from the 2nd Cavalry Headquarters Troop served as his escort. These were the first American troops to land on European soil in the First World War. April 1918 saw the rest of the 2nd Cavalry arrive in France. The regiment was sent to the Toul sector and was initially used to manage horse remount depots and as a military police unit. Troops B, D, F, and H were formed into a provisional squadron and were the last element of the regiment to engage the enemy as horse-mounted cavalry. The 2nd Cavalry fought in the Aisne-Marne Offensive from 18 July – 6 August 1918, and assisted the 1st Infantry Division and the 2nd Infantry Division penetrate the German flanks at Soissons. Detachments of the 2nd Cavalry also fought in the Oise-Aisne Offensive from 8 August – 11 September 1918. The troopers of the 2nd Cavalry also served with distinction in the Battle of Saint-Mihiel; Troops A, B, C, D, F, G, and H fought valiantly under the command of LTC D.P.M. Hazzard from 12 to 16 September.

At this point in the war, 6 American divisions massed on an 18-mile front separate from any European command. The 1st Infantry Division began their attack on Mount Sec and reached the Germans reserve lines. From here, the 2nd Cavalry passed through the forest and scouted the open country around Heudicourt, Creue, and Vigneulles. Elements of the regiment advanced to Saint Maurice, Woël, and Jonville to pursue the retreating enemy.

The 2nd Cavalry's next engagement, the Meuse-Argonne Offensive, would be the largest battle the AEF would fight in World War I. From 26 September – 11 November 1918, the regiment was attached to the 35th Infantry Division and served as the left flank of the advance. Later they served as the main effort of the advance between the Meuse River and the Argonne Forest. From 26 September-2 October, spearheading the assault on the left flank, the 2nd Cavalry fought in a six-day running battle starting in Vauquois and winding through the woods nearby. The men from the Regiment were commended for "...accomplishing their tasks with fearlessness, courage, and disregard for danger and hardship." By the end of the war, 2nd Cavalry troopers had earned three more campaign streamers for the regimental standard for their gallant service.

The 2nd Cavalry remained in Koblenz, Germany as part of the Army of Occupation until August 1919.

=== Interwar period ===
In the years prior to American entry into the Second World War, the 2nd Cavalry was garrisoned at Fort Riley, Kansas from 1919 to 1939. They performed their peacetime duties as a school training regiment for the Cavalry School. Here at Fort Riley, the regiment was equipped with its first armored cars in 1936, the year they celebrated their centennial, marking 100 years of proud national service. In 1938, the 1st Armored Regiment and the 13th Armored Regiment joined the 2nd Cavalry for maneuvers at Fort Riley, to practice and develop combined arms tactics. These maneuvers combined infantry, cavalry, armored, artillery, and aviation units.

=== World War II ===
Nazi Germany's Invasion of Poland in 1939 forced American strategists to focus on building up the Army's armored capabilities, and the Attack on Pearl Harbor thrust the US into the war. On 15 July 1942, the 2nd Cavalry Regiment was inactivated, and all the troops and equipment were transferred to the newly formed 2nd Armored Regiment, 9th Armored Division. The regiment was reactivated on 15 January 1943 at Fort Riley as the 2nd Mechanized Cavalry Group, or the 2nd MCG (Between 1943 and 1946 cavalry were organized into Groups, but this term is interchangeable with Regiment in this context). Charles H. Reed became the 31st Colonel of the Regiment. It was reorganized as the Headquarters and Headquarters Troop (HHT), 2nd Cavalry Reconnaissance Squadron, Mechanized (present day 1st Squadron), and 42nd Cavalry Reconnaissance Squadron, Mechanized (present day 2nd Squadron). In July 1944, the 2nd MCG landed in Normandy as part of General Patton's Third Army. Their early assignments during the Battle of Normandy included rear area security, attempting to disrupt the activities of German infiltrators. They were then attached to General Troy Middleton's VIII Corps during Operation Cobra, and served as a flank security and reconnaissance element for the 4th Armored Division. The cavalry scouts performed such daring reconnaissance missions that their German foes gave them the nickname, "Ghosts of Patton's Army." In August, the 2nd MCG conducted recon of the city of Nantes and aggressively used its light armor and firepower to probe the edges of the Wehrmacht's defense.

As the Third Army began to advance east, the 2nd MCG protected the vulnerable rear and supply lines over a large frontage of 45 miles between Nantes and Angers, as well as the area west of Nantes. In small patrols, the cavalrymen screened the main drive east and disrupted German movement in the Rennes-Nantes Corridor for ten days until 23 August 1944. Now assigned to XII Corps, the 2nd MCG began moving east toward Lorraine. On 26 August, the 42nd Squadron attacked a German regimental-sized unit near Carisey, protecting the southern flank of the 4th Armored Division as it drove on Troyes. On 30 August, the Dragoons led the XII Corps assault across the Marne River, with the 2nd Squadron in front of the 80th Infantry Division and the 42nd Squadron in front of the 4th Armored Division. By 2 September, the drive reached the Moselle River near Toul and the 2nd Squadron began scouting for possible crossing points. Despite a failed crossing attempt by 80th Division troops against stiff resistance, the 2nd MCG was active in scouting and screening during this period. On 4 September, B and F Troops of the 42nd Squadron defeated a column of 1,000 German soldiers attempting to attack the XII Corps flank by massing direct fire from their light tanks, and indirect fire from artillery units.

On 7 September, the 602nd Tank Destroyer Battalion, equipped with M18 Hellcats, was attached to the 2nd MCG. This allowed the 42nd Squadron to assault and capture Fort de Pont-Saint-Vincent and defeat an enemy counterattack. The 2nd MCG then began to protect the southern flank of the 4th Armored Division as it fought to envelop Nancy on 11 September 1944. They were often engaged in heavy contact against German units while protecting the flanks of the 4th Armored Division's assault. On 16 September, the Dragoons launched a squadron-sized attack on Lunéville. The Germans put up a vigorous defense but could not hold against the 2nd MCG, and retreated. However, on 18 September, elements of the 111th Panzer Brigade counterattacked with "six Panther tanks and two companies of infantry." The Panzers' armor was too thick and the cavalrymen were forced to retreat. This was the beginning of the Battle of Arracourt. Conducting a delaying action, the two squadrons worked in tandem and managed to keep the enemy at bay until 1100, when reinforcements of the 4th Armored Division arrived and beat back the Germans. This battle provides a perfect example of how Mechanized Cavalry Groups were designed to function in World War II. Had it not been for the screening and delaying efforts of the 2nd MCG, the main effort of the Wehrmacht attack would have fallen on the flank of the 4th Armored Division.

In late October, the 2nd MCG was assigned to protect the flanks of the 26th Infantry Division by seizing Moncourt Ridge. Despite fierce German resistance, the 42nd Squadron dismounted and attacked along a two-mile front and seized their objectives. The attack was conducted entirely dismounted with cavalrymen acting as infantry, much like dragoons, and showed that MCG's could be flexible. The cavalry group continued to screen and protect the flanks of the 26th Division until 22 November, when the 2nd MCG was split up. The 2nd Squadron remained in the south to cover the gap and maintain contact between XII Corps and XV Corps of the Seventh Army. The 42nd Squadron was sent north to assist the 80th Infantry Division and maintain contact with XX Corps.

On 14 December 1944, the 2nd MCG joined the 35th Infantry Division as it was assaulting the Siegfried Line. They were relieved on 22 December by the 44th Infantry Division and moved north to assist in the relief of Bastogne. Holding the flank against the Germans, the 2nd MCG freed up troops needed for the assault on the southern shoulder of the Bastogne salient. This period was marked by active patrolling and small unit actions to harass the Germans and divert their attention from their main objectives. In early January 1945, C Troop of the 2nd Squadron seized the town of Machtum, killing nine Germans and capturing fourteen, while only losing three wounded.

On 7 February 1945, the 2nd MCG screened the advance of the XII Corps across the Sauer River, and conducted their own assault across the Moselle on 19 February in order to support the advance of the 10th Armored Division. The 2nd Squadron dismounted and led the attack; they seized the town of Wincheringen, and captured 30–40 Germans at the loss of 5 killed and 22 wounded. Conducting limited patrols along the Moselle, the 2nd MCG was assigned to the 76th Infantry Division and was sent to clear the compromised southern flank of the division. After completing this mission, the 42nd Squadron attacked the town of Zemmer on 7 March, and killed 10 Germans, and captured 61. On 2 April, the cavalrymen, conducting scouting and screening missions, located and liberated 3,328 US and 3,205 Allied POWs, including a Soviet general near Bad Orb. The rapid nature of the US advance made rear security of paramount importance, and the 2nd MCG conducted this mission along with other cavalry units. On 10 April, the 42nd Squadron attacked 300 SS troops and 3 tanks near Gleicherwiesen, destroying the enemy's freedom of movement and protecting the advance of XII Corps.

One of the most remarkable missions the 2nd MCG performed was at the end of the war. On 28 April, A Troop, 42nd Squadron seized the town of Hostouň in Czechoslovakia in order to liberate Allied POWs. They discovered 300 POWs, as well as 670 horses, including the famous Lipizzaner stallions. General Patton, a cavalryman himself, ordered their rescue when he learned that the Lipizzaners would fall under Soviet control. On 12 May, four days after VE Day, "Operation Cowboy" was launched to rescue the fine horses, and all were successfully herded or ridden back to American lines. This was dramatized by Walt Disney in the 1963 movie, Miracle of the White Stallions.

=== Cold War ===
The Cold War began in 1945 with the ending of World War II, and the 2nd Cavalry was charged with conducting border surveillance along the Iron Curtain. In 1951, the regiment was headquartered in Nuremberg and operated out of the cities of Freising and Augsburg. In 1955, the cavalry returned to the US and were relieved by the 3rd Armored Cavalry Regiment. They returned to West Germany in 1958, and would remain there for the next 33 years; they operated out of Nuremberg, Feucht, Bindlach, Amberg, and Bamberg. Throughout this period, the 2nd Cavalry was responsible for reconnoitering and providing border security along 731 kilometers of the Iron Curtain; 375 km along with West German-East German border, and 365 km along the West German-Czechoslovak border. In 1978, M Troop, of 3rd Squadron, was selected to represent the US in the 1979 Canadian Army Trophy (CAT), finishing 4th – the first time the US entrant had not placed last. In 1989, the Iron Curtain was lifted, and the regiment halted their border security missions on 1 March 1990.

==== Persian Gulf War ====
When the Persian Gulf War began in 1990, the regiment was ordered to move to Saudi Arabia and prepare for combat operations. By mid-December, the 2nd ACR had established itself in the VII Corps sector of the Saudi desert and began training to fight. The 210th Field Artillery Brigade, AH-64 Apache helicopters from 2-1 Aviation Battalion, and the 82nd Engineer Battalion joined the regiment to form "Dragoon Battle Group", a force of 8,500 soldiers.

On 23 February 1991, the 2nd Cavalry attacked across the Saudi–Iraq border after preparatory fires, and engaged in their first combat operation in 45 years. Spearheading the VII Corps advance, the regiment attacked into southern Iraq and fought a series of sharp battles with four divisions of the Iraqi Army. The 2nd and 3rd Squadrons of the regiment destroyed two brigades of the Iraqi Republican Guards Tawakalna Division in the Battle of 73 Easting. The 2nd Squadron, 2nd ACR alone contributed 55 Iraqi tanks destroyed, 45 other armored vehicles, an equal number of trucks, hundreds of Iraqi infantry KIA, and 865 Iraqi soldiers taken prisoner. The unit earned the Valorous Unit Award for its service in Operation Desert Storm. By the end of its covering force mission in Iraq, the 2nd ACR had broken the Republican Guard's defensive line, provided intelligence to the VII Corps commander, and moved over 250 kilometers. It also captured 2,000 prisoners, destroyed 159 enemy tanks, and 260 other vehicles. The regiment's losses include 6 Dragoons killed, and 19 wounded.

=== Haiti ===
Returning from the Gulf, the 2nd Armored Cavalry Regiment was inactivated at Nuremberg, Germany. The regiment was reactivated as the 2nd Armored Cavalry Regiment (Light) in 1993 by renaming the previous 199th Infantry Brigade (Motorized), the former 3rd Brigade, 9th Infantry Division, at Fort Lewis, Washington. The regiment's ground squadrons became light cavalry units equipped with Humvees mounted with TOW launchers, Mk 19 grenade launchers, .50 caliber machine guns and M249 light machine guns (SAWs). The 2nd ACR (Light) was then sent to Fort Polk in Louisiana in 1993. From there, the regiment deployed in support of the peace enforcement operation in Haiti from 1995 to 1996; Operation Uphold Democracy. The 3rd Squadron ("Wolfpack") was the first ground unit to deploy and operated under the 25th Infantry Division in Port au Prince, Haiti. After six months in Haiti, 1st Squadron arrived to replace 3rd Squadron. In October 1995, 2nd Squadron replaced 3rd Squadron and redeployed in March 1996 completing the cycle. In Haiti the Dragoons served in a number of different roles. They guarded humanitarian relief convoys, and served as the United Nations Quick Reaction Force (UNQRF). They also seized illegal weapons, conducted security patrols, and protected the Haitian president, and the US President (Bill Clinton) and Vice President (Al Gore) when they visited the island.

=== Bosnia service ===
In April 1997, the regiment received orders to be prepared to deploy to Bosnia and Herzegovina. Following the first mission rehearsal exercise held at the JRTC in June, the unit moved to Germany to begin integration with the 1st Armored Division. Meanwhile, all its equipment was shipped to the intermediate staging base at Taszar, Hungary.

The regiment's participation in Operation Joint Guard began when the 2nd and 3rd Squadrons moved across the Sava River into Bosnia in August 1997 to augment the 1st Infantry Division (Forward) in support of Bosnia-Herzegovina's municipal elections. The regiment's air cavalry, the 4th Squadron and the Regimental Support Squadron also moved into the country. The regiment's separate units – the 502nd Military Intelligence Company; the 84th Engineer Company; Company H (Aviation Maintenance), 159th Aviation Regiment; and the Air Defense Battery – completed the regimental troop list.

While the ground squadrons were in Bosnia, the regimental headquarters deployed to Germany to train with the 1st Armored Division Headquarters in preparation for assuming command in Bosnia. During August and September, the regiment was spread across five countries on two continents, and was under the direct command and control of three different general officer commands. This period included another first for any Army unit during a 12-month period: the regiment participated in major training exercises at all three of the Army's combat training centers: The National Training Center (NTC) at Fort Irwin, the Joint Readiness Training Center (JRTC) at Fort Polk, and the Joint Multinational Readiness Center (JMRC) at Hohenfels, Germany. In October the remainder of the regiment rode into theater, assuming responsibility for the American sector of Multinational Division (North), which stretched from the war-torn bridge at Brčko in the north to the shattered city of Srebrenica in the south.

The first major action of the regiment in Bosnia was the seizing of Serbian radio-television towers to control communications into the Republika Srpska. Other significant operations that the regiment conducted include: the restructuring of the Republika Srpska Specialist Police; the creation of the first multi-ethnic police department, in the city of Brčko; security for the announcement of the Brcko Arbitration Decision (an effort to resolve the status of this Serb-dominated city within Bosnia); institution of common license plates and currency in Bosnia, and the opening of the Bosnian rail system. In conducting operations in this sector, the regiment executed an estimated 12,500 patrols and 480 weapon storage site inspections, supervised the removal of over 12,000 mines, and oversaw 350 training exercises for the former warring factions. The regiment served one of the longest tours of military units there.

=== Global war on terrorism ===
After returning from Bosnia, the unit remained at Fort Polk, Louisiana. On 13 April 2002, B Troop, 1-2 Cavalry deployed to Southwest Asia in support of Operation Enduring Freedom and the Global War of Terrorism. They provided port and site security in Kuwait, Qatar, Jordan, and Djibouti, and were relieved by L Troop, 3-2 Cavalry, in October, who continued these duties.

==== Iraq War ====
On 25 March 2003, 2nd Squadron was deployed again to the Gulf for Operation Iraqi Freedom. The squadron began combat operations by 1 April 2003. The rest of the regiment arrived in May and operated in eastern Baghdad. The troopers worked to improve the peoples' lives, and provided security to infrastructure sites such as power stations, telephone stations, fuel stations, schools, and hospitals. The 2nd Armored Cavalry also took direct action in hundreds of raids to disrupt the activities of the Fedayeen Saddam militia. The regiment also trained several companies of the Iraqi Civil Defense Corps (ICDC) to assist their operations. On 19 August 2003, a VBIED detonated near a UN compound and a spinal cord clinic causing consternation and much damage. Elements of the 2nd Cavalry rushed to secure the area, and saved the lives of 125 UN workers.

On 4 April 2004, the 2nd Armored Cavalry and the 1st BCT-1st Cavalry Division engaged in fierce urban fighting during the Siege of Sadr City. The Dragoons and thousands of Muqtada al-Sadr's militiamen, the Mahdi Army, clashed in a violent battle that cost 8 US and 300 enemy deaths. This initial battle marked the beginning of several more uprisings throughout Iraq, and the 2nd Cavalry was soon sent south to battle insurgents in Hillah, Al Kut, An Najaf, Kufa, and Al Diwaniyah. This action forced them to stay in Iraq for a further three months. The battles of Al Kut, Kufa, and Al Diwaniyah were short, but intense. The regiment was forced to retake each town from hostile forces and seize government buildings. In An Najaf, hundreds of Mahdi Militiamen fought a protracted urban campaign that lasted a few weeks. In late June 2004, the 2nd Cavalry was relieved by elements of the 1st Infantry Division and returned to Fort Polk on 15 July 2004. In Iraq, the Dragoons suffered 21 killed and over 100 wounded. They had inflicted 1,000 deaths on their enemy and captured hundreds more. A total of 16 months was spent in combat, and the regiment earned another Presidential Unit Citation. On its return from combat operations, the 2nd ACR found itself heading back to Fort Lewis in Washington in December 2004. The regiment was re-designated the 2nd Cavalry Regiment and reorganized as a Stryker brigade combat team in April 2005.

On 1 June 2006 at Fort Lewis, Washington, the 2nd Cavalry Regiment and the 1st Brigade, 25th Infantry Division conducted a joint re-flagging and Casing of the Colors ceremony. The 2nd CR was reflagged as the 4th Brigade, 2nd Infantry Division (Stryker). The 1st Brigade, 25th Infantry Division cased its brigade colors and was reflagged as the 2nd Stryker Cavalry Regiment. The Army re-stationed 2nd SCR to Rose Barracks, Vilseck, Germany, near the regiment's Cold War home of Nuremberg, as of 15 September 2006. With a foundation of infantry-based tactics and the mobility of the Stryker vehicle, the Stryker unit has become more of a hybrid, filling the gap between pure, light infantry and the mechanized, heavy infantry.

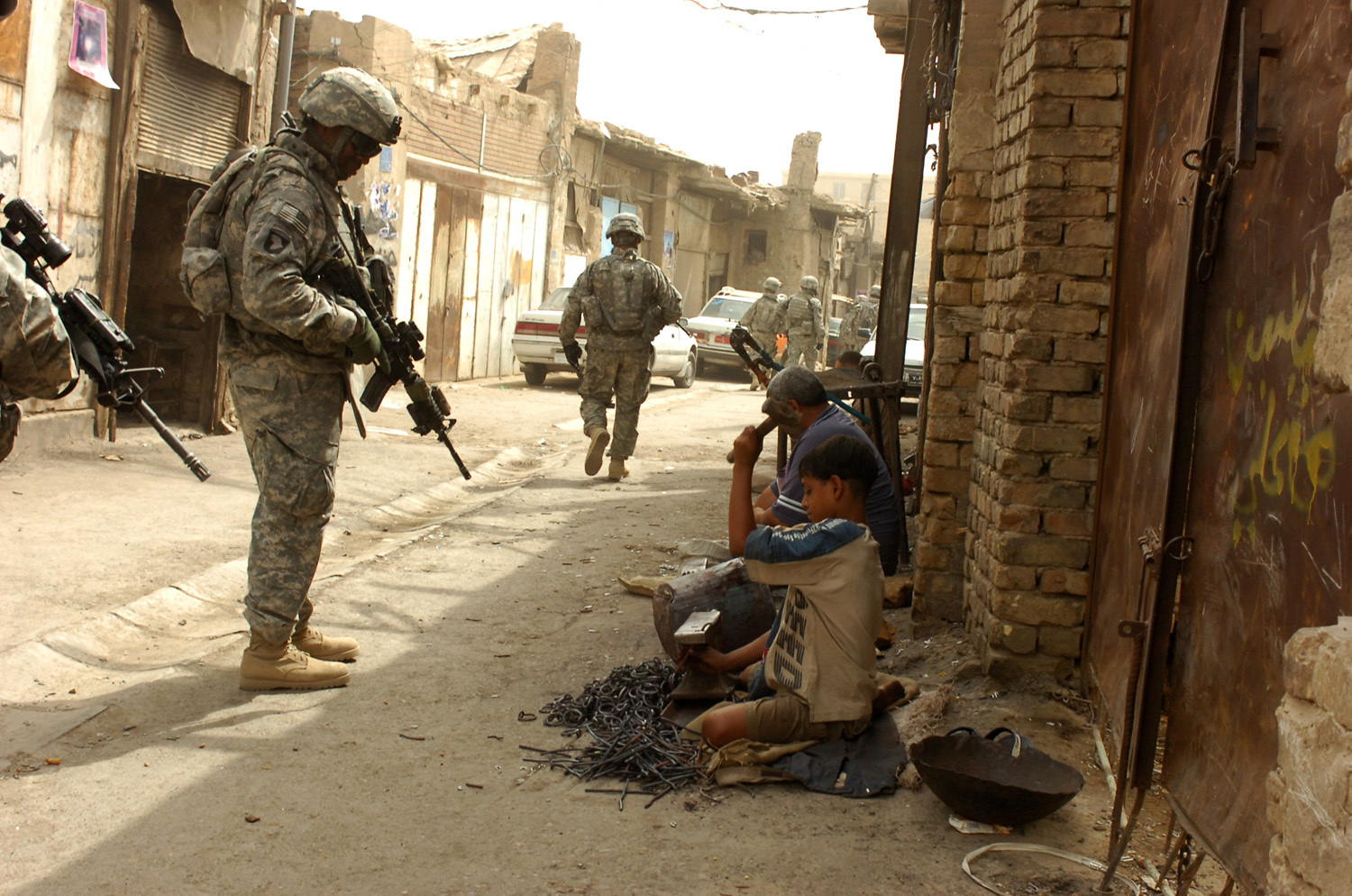
A 2nd Cavalry Regiment soldier, watches a young Iraqi boy pound steel into chainlinks during his platoon's patrol through the market area in the Karkh District of Baghdad 8 September 2007.

On 12 August 2007, the Dragoons arrived in Kuwait and prepared for another combat deployment in Iraq. On 13 September, the regiment replaced the 3rd Stryker Brigade, 2nd Infantry Division at Camp Liberty, Baghdad as part of President George W. Bush's surge campaign. 1st Squadron (War Eagles), with Troops A, B, and C, was sent to NE Baghdad to work in Sadr City, Hayy Ur, Thawra, Jamilla, and Adhamiyah. They conducted numerous cordon-and-search, checkpoint, and raid missions until the Jaysh al-Mahdi uprising in March 2008. Joining with Iraqi Army and Iraqi Police, 1st Squadron fought these insurgents until a ceasefire was brokered on 11 March. The squadron assisted building a security wall in Sadr City and conducted many civic action projects until it was sent to Mosul in August 2008 to assist the 3rd Armored Cavalry Regiment quell the violence in that city.

2nd Squadron (Cougars), with Troops D, E, and F, was sent to East Rashid in south central Baghdad. E Troop was quickly lauded for its aggressive operations against Al-Qaeda in Iraq (AQI) extremists, which resulted in 10 wounded Dragoons and 13 enemy killed in action. Working alongside the 3rd Squadron (Wolfpack), with Troops G, H, I, and N, they cleared the neighborhoods of Dora and Hadar in Operation Dragoon Talon. The combined effort of 2nd Squadron and 3rd Squadron cleared out East Rashid or AQI insurgents, and allowed local nationals to return to their homes.

While 2nd Squadron was in East Rashid until May 2008, 3rd Squadron was acting as the Corps reserve and sent to Diyala Governorate to conduct clearing operations with the 4th Stryker Brigade, 2nd Infantry Division. G, H, and I Troops were sent to the "breadbasket of Iraq" in the Hamrin Mountains during Operation Raider Harvest to clear out AQI strongholds. From December 2007-October 2008, the region was made safer and infrastructure was improved by the squadron as they defeated numerous AQI cells and conducted humanitarian operations.

4th Squadron (Sabre), with Troops O, P, Q, and elements of I moved to FOB Prosperity in the Al Karkh district of the Green Zone. Here, the troopers secured the heart of Baghdad and turned it into one of the most secure areas of the city; they successfully partnered with units of the Iraqi Army and police to accomplish this mission.

Fires Squadron (Hell), with A, B, and C Batteries along with support from K Troop, was based out of Camp Taji to secure the region of Agar Quf northeast of Baghdad. C Battery acted as the reserve force of the 1st Brigade, 1st Cavalry Division and conducted air assault mission to kill or capture high value targets. The remainder of the squadron continued to secure the Agar Quf region and conducted both combat and humanitarian operations. In January 2008, Fires Squadron was returned to Regimental control, and 1st Battalion-21st Infantry Regiment (Gimlets) was attached to the 2nd Cavalry.

In April 2008, the 2nd Cavalry Regiment moved to Diyala Governorate to replace the 4th Brigade, 2nd Infantry Division and joined with elements of the 3rd Cavalry Regiment to combat extremist Sunni and Shia militias. The Dragoons also conducted humanitarian operations and partnered with their Iraqi allies to make this possible. In Operation Glad Tidings of Benevolence 50,000 Iraqi soldiers and police officers assisted the regiment in aiding the community, as well as clearing out villages, roads, and farms controlled by terrorist forces.

At the completion of this 15-month tour in Iraq, it was at its most consolidated by June 2008 with all units in Diyala but 1st Squadron, which was in Sadr City. On 25 November 2008, the 2nd Cavalry Regiment (Stryker) was officially welcomed back to Vilseck, Germany on 7 October 2008. In Iraq from 2007 to 2008, the 2nd Stryker Cavalry Regiment lost 29 soldiers killed, 250 injured, and 70 vehicles were damaged. They managed to kill over 100 confirmed enemies and capture 1,100 more. 100,000 IEDs, weapons, and other enemy materiel items were either captured or destroyed.

==== War in Afghanistan ====
On 15 March 2010, the Department of Defense announced that the 2nd Cavalry Regiment would deploy to Afghanistan in support of Operation Enduring Freedom and the International Security Assistance Force in July 2010. In July 2010, 1st Squadron assumed responsibility of Tarin Kowt, Afghanistan in Uruzgan Province as well as the Shah Wali Kot District serving alongside Australia's 2nd Cavalry Regiment. The remainder of the regiment was located in the volatile Zabul Province with regimental headquarters located at FOB Lagman. 3d Squadron was sent to the Maiwand district in support of Combined Task Force Strike. During their attachment to CTF Strike, 3d Squadron took part in battle harden operations such as Operation Dragon Strike in which 3d Squadron, along with the other units in the CTF, earned the Presidential Unit Citation along with several personal medals for valor for the intense fighting and stabilization brought back to the region which took place during the operation.

In the summer of 2013, the 2nd Cavalry Regiment deployed to Afghanistan for a second time in southern Afghanistan in support of Operation Enduring Freedom and the International Security Assistance Force. The Regiment redeployed to Rose Barracks in April 2014. The Regiment was awarded the Meritorious Unit Commendation for their efforts in Kandahar Province, Afghanistan.

== Organization ==
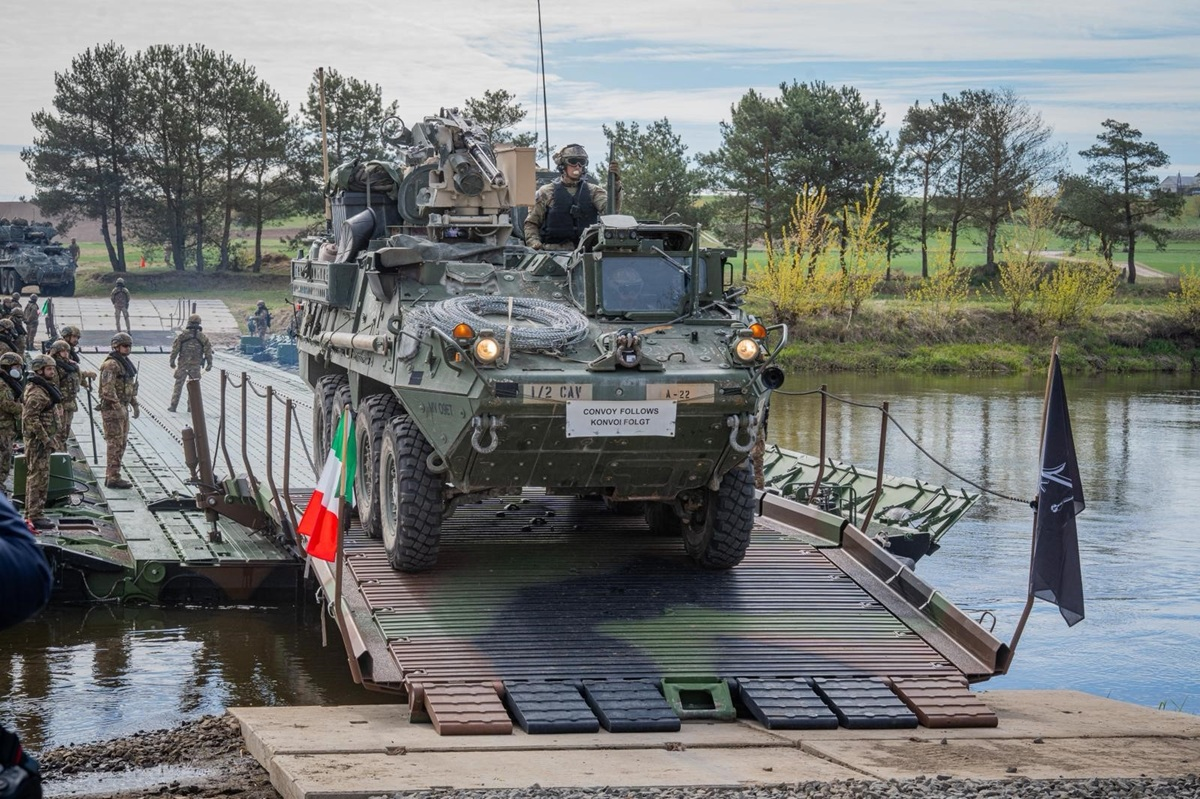
1st Squadron, 2nd Cavalry Regiment Stryker vehicles crossing an Italian Army 2nd Pontieri Engineer Regiment pontoon bridge during exercise "Saber Strike 2026" in Poland

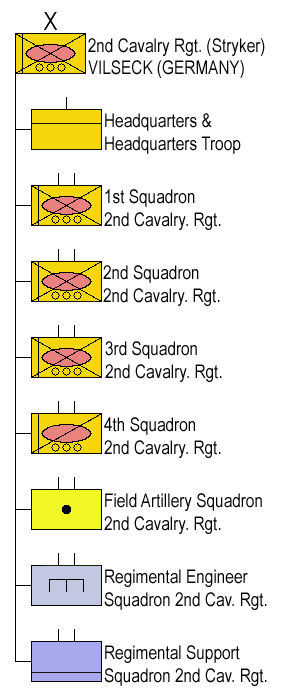
2nd Cavalry Regiment(Stryker) Structure

As of December 2025 the 2nd Cavalry Regiment is organized as a Stryker brigade combat team and consists of the following units: a regimental headquarters and headquarters troop, four cavalry squadrons, a regimental engineer squadron, a field artillery squadron and a regimental support squadron.

- 2nd Cavalry Regiment
  - Regimental Headquarters and Headquarters Troop "Vipers"
  - 1st Squadron 2nd Cavalry Regiment "War Eagles" (Stryker Squadron)
    - Headquarters and Headquarters Troop, 1st Squadron, 2nd Cavalry Regiment "Mustangs"
    - Apache Troop (Stryker Infantry Troop)
    - Bull Troop (Stryker Infantry Troop)
    - Comanche Troop (Stryker Infantry Troop)
    - Dakota Troop (Forward Support Troop)
  - 2nd Squadron 2nd Cavalry Regiment "Cougars" (Stryker squadron)
    - Headquarters and Headquarters Troop, 2nd Squadron, 2nd Cavalry Regiment "Headhunters"
    - Eagle Troop (Stryker Infantry Troop)
    - Fox Troop (Stryker Infantry Troop)
    - Ghost Troop (Stryker Infantry Troop)
    - Havoc Troop (Forward Support Troop)
  - 3rd Squadron 2nd Cavalry Regiment "Wolfpack" (Stryker Squadron)
    - Headquarters and Headquarters Troop, 3rd Squadron, 2nd Cavalry Regiment "Hammer"
    - Iron Troop (Stryker Infantry Troop)
    - Killer Troop (Stryker Infantry Troop)
    - Lightning Troop (Stryker Infantry Troop)
    - Fury Troop (Forward Support Troop)
  - 4th Squadron 2nd Cavalry Regiment "Saber" (Reconnaissance, Surveillance, and Target Acquisition Squadron)
    - Headquarters and Headquarters Troop, 4th Squadron, 2nd Cavalry Regiment "Warhorse"
    - Nemesis Troop (Stryker Cavalry Scout Troop)
    - Outlaw Troop (Stryker Cavalry Scout Troop)
    - Palehorse Troop (Stryker Cavalry Scout Troop)
    - Quickstrike Troop (Anti-armor Troop, equipped with Stryker M1134 anti-tank guided missile vehicles)
    - War Wagon Troop (Forward Support Troop)
  - Regimental Engineer Squadron 2nd Cavalry Regiment "Pioneers"
    - Headquarters and Headquarters Troop 2nd Cavalry Regiment Regimental Engineer Squadron "Lakota"
    - Argonaut Troop (Engineer Troop)
    - Beast Troop (Engineer Troop)
    - Chaos Troop (Signal Troop)
    - Delta Troop (Military Intelligence Troop)
    - Elite Troop (Forward Support Troop)
  - Field Artillery Squadron 2nd Cavalry Regiment "Artillery Hell"
    - Headquarters and Headquarters Battery 2nd Cavalry Regiment Field Artillery Squadron "Hellraisers"
    - Archer Battery (6-gun M777A2 155 mm howitzer battery)
    - Bulldog Battery (6-gun M777A2 155 mm howitzer battery)
    - Cobra Battery (6-gun M777A2 155 mm howitzer battery)
    - Phoenix Troop (Forward Support Troop)
  - Regimental Support Squadron 2nd Cavalry Regiment "Muleskinners"
    - Headquarters and Headquarters Troop 2nd Cavalry Regiment Regimental Support Squadron "Hellraisers"
    - Supply and Transportation Troop "Pack Horse"
    - Maintenance Troop "Blacksmiths"
    - Medical Troop "Cerberus"

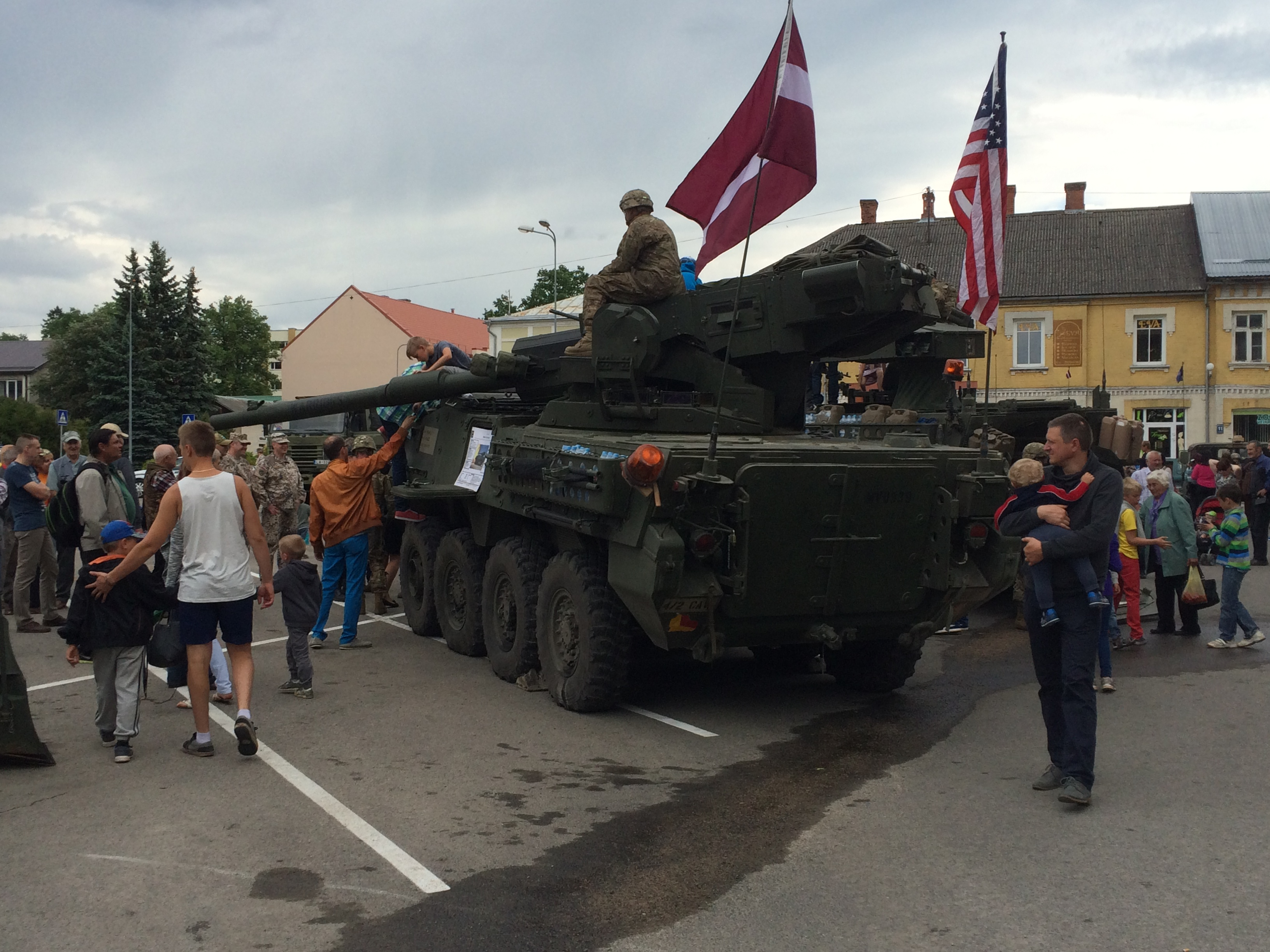
M1128 Mobile Gun System in Latvia, 2016

== Medal of Honor recipients ==
- Sgt Conrad Schmidt. US Civil War, on 19 September 1864 at the Third Battle of Winchester; awarded 16 March 1896.
- Private Heth Canfield. Indian Wars. On 15 May 1870, while serving with Company C at Little Blue, Nebraska, for displaying gallantry in action.
- Private Michael Himmelsback. Indian Wars. On 15 May 1870, while serving with Company C at Little Blue, Nebraska, for displaying gallantry in action.
- Private Patrick James Leonard. Indian Wars. On 15 May 1870, while serving with Company C at Little Blue, Nebraska, for displaying gallantry in action.
- Private Thomas Hubbard. Indian Wars. On 15 May 1870, while serving with Company C at Little Blue, Nebraska, for displaying gallantry in action.
- Private George W. Thompson. Indian Wars. On 15 May 1870. while serving with Company C at Little Blue, Nebraska, for gallantry in action.
- Private Wilfred Clark. Indian Wars. On 9 August 1877 at Big Hole, Montana, and on 20 August 1877 at Camas Meadows, Idaho, while serving with Company L, for displaying conspicuous gallantry, especial skill as sharpshooter.
- Private William Leonard. Indian Wars. On 7 May 1877, while serving with Company L, for bravery in action.
- First Sergeant Henry Wilkens. Indian Wars. On 7 May 1877, at Little Muddy Creek, Montana, and 20 August 1877 at Camas Meadows, Idaho, for gallantry in action.
- Private Samuel D. Phillips. Indian Wars. On 7 May 1877, while serving with Company H at Little Muddy Creek, Montana, for gallantry in action.
- Corporal Harry Garland. Indian Wars. On 7 May 1877 at Little Muddy Creek, Montana, and on 29 August 1877 at Camas Meadows, Idaho, while serving with Company L, for gallantry in action with hostile Sioux, at Little Muddy Creek, Mont.; having been wounded in the hip so as to be unable to stand, at Camas Meadows, Idaho, he still continued to direct the men under his charge until the enemy withdrew.
- William H. Jones. Indian Wars. While serving with Company L, on 7 May 1877 at Little Muddy Creek, Montana for gallantry in the attack against hostile Sioux Indians, and on 20 August 1877 at Camas Meadows for the engagement with Nez Perces Indians in which he sustained a painful knee wound.
- Second Lieutenant Edward J. McClernand. Indian Wars. On 20 September 1877, for gallantly attacking a band of hostiles and conducting the combat with excellent skill and boldness.
- Sergeant T.B. Glover. Indian Wars. On 10 April 1879 at Mizpah Creek, Montana, and at Pumpkin Creek, Montana on 10 February 1880, while serving with Troop B, he was in charge of small scouting parties, fought, charged, surrounded, and captured war parties of Sioux Indians.
- Captain Eli L. Huggins. Indian Wars. On 1 April 1880, at O'Fallons Creek, Montana, for surprising the Indians in their strong position and fighting them until dark with great boldness.
- Second Lieutenant Lloyd M. Brett. Indian Wars. On 1 April 1880, at O'Fallons Creek, Montana, his fearless exposure and dashing bravery in cutting off the Indians' pony herd, thereby greatly crippling the hostiles.

== Notable members ==
- Creighton W. Abrams
- Henry Tureman Allen
- Ripley A. Arnold
- Joseph Barnes
- John Buford
- George Armstrong Custer
- Harry Chamberlin
- John Davidson
- Martin Dempsey
- Tommy Franks
- William Gainey
- William Hardee
- Douglas Lute
- Charles A. May
- H. R. McMaster
- Wesley Merritt
- Michael Powell
- Peter Schoomaker

== Regimental commanders ==
- David E. Twiggs
- William S. Harney
- Philip St. George Cooke
- Thomas J. Wood
- Innis N. Palmer
- John Davidson (general)
- John Porter Hatch
- Dorsey R. Rodney
- Lawrence Edward Schlanser
- Nelson B. Sweitzer
- David R. Clendenin
- George G. Hunt
- Henry E. Noyes
- Eli L. Huggins
- Winfield Scott Edgerly
- Fredrick K. Ward
- David M. Maddox - 61st Colonel of the Regiment
- Colonel Leonard D. "Don" Holder - 65th Colonel of the Regiment
- John C. Eberle - 66th Colonel of the Regiment
- Frank West (Medal of Honor)
- Thomas J. Lewis
- William Jones Nicholson
- Joseph T. Dickman
- Arthur Thayer
- John S. Winn
- Charles A. Romeyn
- John T. Cole
- John H. Tilelli Jr. General Vice Chief of Staff
- Colonel James J. Steele
- Colonel Thomas M. Molino (67th Colonel; Fort Lewis/Fort Polk)
- Colonel James P. Cahill

== Alliances ==
- Australia – 2nd Cavalry Regiment (Bond of friendship)
- Germany – German Versorgungsbataillon 4 (Bond of friendship)

== See also ==
- Officers and men of G Company, 2nd Cavalry are featured in the 2017 Western film Hostiles, set in New Mexico Territory in 1892.
- List of United States Regular Army Civil War units
