= History of the School of Advanced Military Studies =

The history of the United States Army School of Advanced Military Studies (SAMS) has its beginning in the early 1980s. It began as an additional year of study for selected graduates of the United States Army's Command and General Staff College at Fort Leavenworth, Kansas. Although there was some disagreement as to the course purpose, it settled into providing its students a "broad, deep military education in the science and art of war."

Colonel Wass de Czege provided the vision and impetus for the school, and coordinated the shaping of the curriculum and the school before and during its early years. The early years were marked with uncertainty about how its graduates would be accepted and how they would perform, but the initial results from the field were positive. Its growing popularity and reputation attracted students from other U.S. uniformed services, and eventually international military students. U.S. interagency students from the Defense Intelligence Agency, Department of State, and the United States Agency for International Development, among others followed.

The first major combat test for SAMS graduates was Operation Just Cause, where the school further built its reputation. However, it wasn't until Operation Desert Storm that SAMS graduates earned the moniker of "Jedi Knight", due partly to their efforts in planning the invasion. Since then, SAMS graduates have participated in nearly every U.S. military operation as well as military operations other than war, such as relief efforts following Hurricane Katrina. Today, the school produces "leaders with the flexibility of mind to solve complex operational and strategic problems in peace, conflict, and war".

== Early years ==
The impetus for the SAMS course manifested in various forms. Colonel Richard Sennrich, SAMS's second director, pointed to a post-Vietnam War "hole" in U.S. military education between the CGSC focus on tactics and the war colleges' focus on " 'grand strategy' and national security policy". In the period after the Vietnam War, the commandant of the United States Army's Command and General Staff College (CGSC), lieutenant general (LTG) William Richardson, "ordered the directors of CGSC to find ways to 'improve the tactical judgment' of CGSC graduates." Colonel Huba Wass de Czege, an officer stationed at Fort Leavenworth, was the primary driver for the creation of the school. According to Wass de Czege, the solutions generated were inadequate, and he readied a new proposal—starting a new school—which he briefed to LTG Richardson during a trip to China on the Yangtze River in the spring of 1981. In 1982–1983, Wass de Czege's purpose was to "develop a curriculum for a course focused on large unit operations and specifically the operational art". After approval on 28 December 1982 by General Glen Otis (the commander of the U.S. Army's Training and Doctrine Command—TRADOC), a pilot program began in June 1983—a "1-year extension of the Command and General Staff College ... for specially selected officers."

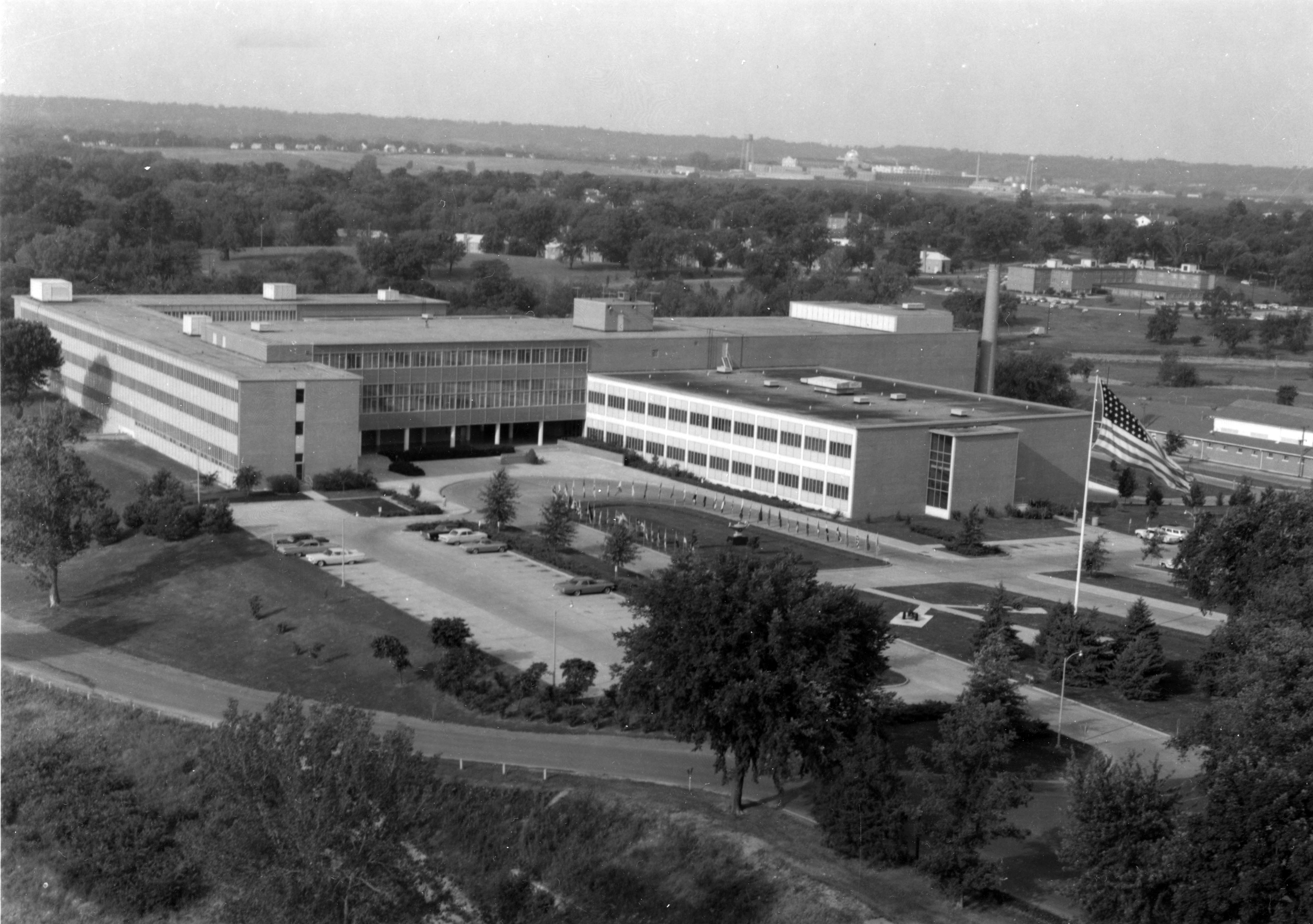
Bell Hall

As a further indication of the need for extended schooling, Wass de Czege compared the length of the U.S. Army's staff college (42 weeks) to that of other "first rate" armies such as Canada, Germany, Russia, and the United Kingdom, with lengths between 65 and 150 weeks for selected officers. He also pointed to periods in the past when the Command and General Staff School was two years in duration.

=== Course purpose ===
There were a number of considerations regarding the purpose and concept for the school. Wass de Czege thought that certain officers should receive a "broad, deep military education in the science and art of war." Graduates would not be a "privileged elite", but would "create a multiplier effect in all areas of Army competence." But there were varying ideas about what product the course should generate. For example, the commandant of the Command and General Staff School, Lieutenant General Jack N. Merritt "wanted sort of a junior Henry Kissinger kind of course," whereas the deputy commandant, Major General Crosbie Saint Jr. envisioned a "super dooper tacticians course." What was developed, and eventually approved, by both officers was "a broad-based curriculum that began with military theory and ended with courses on preparing for war—a logical progression through the complexities of warfare".

Although Army senior leaders had accepted the need for the school, an additional challenge was finding the right students to attend. According to John S. Brown, "A fraction of SAMS's popularity was its exploitation of a time-honored technique: Seduce talented officers into staff work by promising to make them line officers in due course.

=== Course development ===
Two officers became the "curriculum carpenters" to mold the course with Wass de Czege: Lieutenant Colonel Hal Winton, and Lieutenant Colonel Douglas Johnson. They developed the course from March to June 1983 in accordance with U.S. Army TRADOC requirements. Lieutenant Colonel L. Don Holder later also joined the team. They planned travel into the course, including observation of Regular Army and National Guard training, as well as visits to U.S. military headquarters and a trip to Europe for a NATO exercise.

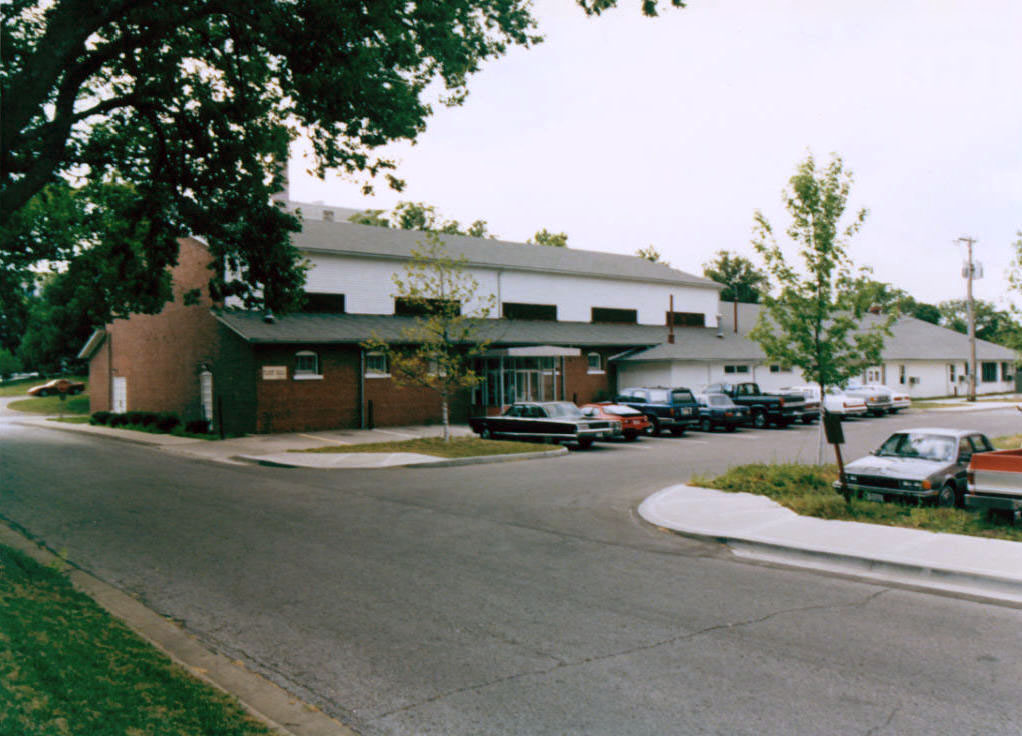
Flint Hall, circa 1980s.

In June 1983, students reported for the first SAMS class. Although the curriculum was ready, the school faced a number of challenges at the outset. For example, there was no separate academic building for the school. Classrooms in Fort Leavenworth's Bell Hall (image right) were reserved "on a daily basis." During the first year, Winton observed that, "It was a little bit on the fly and everybody put up with that and understood it." Difficulties aside, the 13 students of the first class completed their studies and graduated in May 1984. By then, SAMS had become "the symbol for intellectual renaissance in the officer corps".

As planned at the outset, enrollment steadily increased in following years; the second class comprised 24 students, which rose to 52 by 1991—the year SAMS graduates would be tested in Operation Desert Storm. The school saw a number of other changes as well in the early years. Due to challenges with the Army Personnel Management Division in supplying high-quality officers to serve as instructors for three years, Wass de Czege made some adjustments. In 1984, he hired the first two civilian faculty members, both with PhDs in history. Additionally, in 1985, the Advanced Operational Studies Fellowship (AOSF)^{[a]} began, which put selected officers through the course and made them instructors in the following year.

By the time Wass de Czege relinquished the reins as director of the school to Colonel Richard Sennreich in 1985, the school was beginning to produce results: "The Army as a whole and the College in particular came to view SAMS as a useful experiment." But the school was not done developing. In 1986, Sennreich changed the name from the Department of Advanced Military Studies to the School of Advanced Military Studies. This action "ensured a large degree of freedom for future directors" by establishing it as a separate school within CGSC.

By the time Colonel L. Don Holder became the third Director of the school, the effect of SAMS on the force was still unclear. Attendance "was still regarded as 'a slightly chancy thing to sign up for'". Yet, there were positive signs. Other uniformed services became interested in benefitting from the course. During Holder's tenure, there were Air Force officers in each of the four AMSP seminars. The program was also "growing in popularity", applications for entry into SAMS soon more than doubled the available 48 seats, and the result of the admissions process "was a very select, bright group of officers who were eager for the SAMS experience.

Holder instituted further changes. As a masters-degree program, the requirement to write a single master's thesis was changed to two monographs.^{[b]} Holder also split the SAMS Fellows (AOSF) into a separate seminar with their own curriculum. But the changes did not stop there. Holder saw the first international officer assigned as a SAMS faculty member—a British Colonel who eventually led a seminar due to various faculty members' departure to command U.S. Army brigades in 1987.

By 1990, SAMS was called to help develop U.S. Army doctrine. Lieutenant Colonel Thomas E. Mitchell, the fifth SAMS director, Colonel James McDonough, and various other members of the SAMS team played a significant part in revising the U.S. Army Doctrinal Manual 100-5 Operations in 1990–1993.

== Curriculum development ==
I realized that the SAMS guy in the Division HQ was the go-to person for everyone.

— Mark Hertling, 1988 SAMS graduate.

In the early years, the course "was defined largely by historical studies of modern, and usually armored, campaigns and analyzed in terms of Clausewitzian concepts, particularly centers of gravity and culmination". This, according to the school's second director, separated the course from the Jominian focus—adherence to a recipe of rules and principles—of the Command and General Staff College. The school's founders also stressed the importance of theory, and this became an integral part of the course. Clausewitz, Jomini, Mao Zedong, Sun Tzu, and Tuchachevsky found homes in SAMS' theory courses. Critical thinking, as part of the course, was reinforced by guest speakers, who also "challenged conventional wisdom".

== Operation Just Cause and beyond ==
In its early years, the value of the school had not yet been clearly established. The "first test of battle" for SAMS graduates came during Operation Just Cause. A core planning cell of seven SAMS graduates "crafted a well rehearsed and well executed plan that simultaneously struck some roughly 50 objectives in a single coordinated blow". According to Kevin Benson, "The Army and SAMS faced a test of battle and the new group of highly-educated planners appeared to have passed the test with flying colors."

Eisenhower Hall

The results of Operation Just Cause reverberated within the school. An end-of-course survey in 1990 suggested that—considering the operation—" 'LIC [low intensity conflict] needed more emphasis', and that the course needed 'more joint participation'". The school and faculty knew that there would be further tests for SAMS graduates ahead. They were not wrong: "The next test ... would take place in the deserts of the Persian Gulf."

Shortly after General Norman Schwarzkopf arrived in Riyadh, Saudi Arabia in 1990, U.S. Army Chief of Staff, General Carl Vuono offered him the use of some SAMS graduates. Schwarzkopf accepted. These SAMS planners became known as "Schwarzkopf's famous 'Jedi Knights'". This "small Jedi Knight team ... would dramatically shape the outlines of Operation Desert Storm".^{[c]} But the efforts of SAMS graduates were not limited to the initial planning effort. 82 graduates were participating in "a wide array of command and planning tasks", in the theater by February 1991. These efforts "established SAMS in the minds of the leadership of the Army as a place to turn to for superb planners".

The number one reason for the success of Desert Storm was General (H. Norman) Schwarzkopf. ... The number two reason was the air war, and the number three reason was the SAMS graduates who put together General Schwarzkopf's plan.

— Williamson Murray, Professor of Military History at Ohio State University, 1991

After Desert Storm, the school again looked ahead. The Army was "grappling with a range of new problems: military operations other than war, peacekeeping, and peace enforcement operations". The school and its graduates examined the situations in Bosnia, Haiti, and Somalia, and SAMS Jedi Knights engaged in operations worldwide, as well as domestic contingencies such as those in Los Angeles and Miami (after Hurricane Katrina). But SAMS graduates had not completely turned away from large-scale operational planning. Lieutenant General Guy C. Swan noted that SAMS graduates were indispensable in Europe after the fall of the Berlin Wall and the dissolution of the WARSAW Pact. They were expected to "re-engineer the decades of planning that had gone into the GDP [General Defense Plan] almost overnight". Swan stated that this was "the first true test of SAMS on a large scale".

The course itself continued to change in the waning hours of the twentieth century. Under Colonel Robin P. Swan, the school moved from Fort Leavenworth's Flint Hall to Eisenhower Hall (image right) in October 1994. Swan also decided to add an additional two seminars. The civilian faculty also expanded.

The drawdown in forces after Operation Desert Storm affected SAMS as well. By 1998, the school's enrollment began to shrink based on timing concerns by eligible students in a shrinking force. This was in spite of favorable comparisons between SAMS attendees and non-attendees on promotion and command selection boards in 1995–1998.

== The 21st century ==
Although the first class comprised only 13 students, "subsequent classes over the next 16 years averaged 48." By the twentieth century, demand for SAMS graduates increased. By the year 2000, there were 57 students in the program; this would increase to 95 in the next four years. This was within the range of 36 to 120 that Wass de Czege predicted in 1983 would "assure quality" in the course.

SAMS's "Jedi Knights" played a significant role in the war on terrorism / Iraq War as well. The United States Central Command requested SAMS graduates along with its "sister schools", the United States Air Force's School of Advanced Air and Aerospace Studies (SAAAS), as well as the United States Marine Corps's School of Advanced Warfighting (SAW). These planners participated in the preparations for the invasion of Iraq, as well as a "post-hostility plan for the occupation of Iraq".

Four years later, SAMS officers also deployed to Baton Rouge, Louisiana, to assist Joint Task Force Katrina and the Federal Emergency Management Agency after Hurricane Katrina.

The school continued to morph to meet the demands of a changing world. An additional faculty expansion occurred in 2005–2006, and the Fellows' curriculum shifted further away from that of the AMSP program's. To meet an increasing demand, the 11th Director, Colonel Steve Banach, began a winter-start SAMS course in 2007. During this period, SAMS also "continued to serve the Army at war as a 'reach' asset", helping deployed headquarters plan operations and contingencies.

On 30 August 2011 the school's offices and most of its seminars moved from Eisenhower Hall to the newly renovated Muir Hall at Fort Leavenworth.

== Directors of the school ==
- 1983. Huba Wass de Czege
- 1986. Richard Sinnreich
- 1987. Leonard D. Holder Jr.
- 1989. William Janes
- 1990. James McDonough
- 1994. Greg Fontenot
- 1995. Danny M. Davis
- 1998. Robin P. Swan
- 2001. James K. Greer
- 2003. Kevin Benson
- 2007. Steve Banach
- 2010. Wayne Grigsby
- 2011. Thomas Graves

== Notes ==
a. In 1995, the name changed to the Advanced Operational Arts Studies Fellowship (AOASF).
b. The school investigated adding a Doctor of Military Art and Sciences degree—a military PhD program—under the fifth SAMS Director, COL James McDonough, in the early 1990s. These plans were eventually dropped. The two-monograph requirement was later reduced to one under the eighth SAMS Director, Colonel Robin P. Swan, where it remains as of 2012.
c. According to the Command and General Staff College, SAMS graduates are "remembered most famously in the early days for producing the 'Jedi Knights' employed by Gen. Norman Schwarzkopf in developing the famous 'left hook' during Desert Storm".

== Bibliography ==
- Baggott, Christopher L. (1998). The School of Advanced Military Studies in the 21st Century (SAMS Monograph). United States Army Command and General Staff College.
- Baker, Jon E.; Sepanic, Jason R. (October–December 2010). "The School for Advanced Military Studies: An Untapped Resource for the Army Medical Department". U.S. Army Medical Department Journal. U.S. Army Medical Department: 78–80.
- Banach, Stefan J. (March–April 2009). "Educating by Design: Preparing Leaders for a Complex World". Military Review: 96–104.
- Barth, Frank L. (2002). The Challenges of Leadership Development in the United States Army: Part II: The School of Advanced Military Studies (SAMS) (SAMS Monograph). United States Army Command and General Staff College.
- Bower, Melissa (9 December 2010), "SAMS Graduates Renowned for Skill Sets", The LAMP
- Brown, John S. "The Maturation of Operational Art: Operation Desert Shield and Desert Storm." In Krause, Michael D.; Phillips, R. Cody, eds. (2005). Historical Perspectives of the Operational Art. Washington D.C.: Center of Military History. pp. 439–475.
- Benson, Kevin (2009). School of Advanced Military Studies Commemorative History: 1984–2009 (PDF). Kansas: United States Army Command and General Staff College. Archived from the original (PDF) on 29 August 2012.
- Benson, Kevin C. M. (2010). Educating the Army's Jedi: The School of Advanced Military Studies and the Introduction of Operational Art into U.S. Army Doctrine, 1983–1994 (PhD Diss.). University of Kansas.
- Bower, Melissa (9 December 2010), "SAMS Graduates Renowned for Skill Sets", The LAMP
- Erickson, Matt (30 August 2011). "Former Horse Stables Become Site of Fort Leavenworth Officer School after $12.2 Million Renovation". The Tonganoxie Mirror.
- Gifford, John L. (2000). Teaching and Learning the Operational Art of War: An Appraisal of the School of Advanced Military Studies (SAMS Monograph). United States Army Command and General Staff College.
- Goble, Jeffrey J. (2008). Wants and Needs: SAMS' Relationship with the Army (SAMS Monograph). United States Army Command and General Staff College.
- High, Gill (April 1999). "More than "Officer U"". Soldiers. 54 (4): 32–35.
- Huntoon, David (21 May 2009). "Huntoon Speech" (PDF). United States Army Combined Arms Center. Archived from the original (PDF) on 29 August 2012.
- Krause, Michael D.; Phillips, R. Cody, eds. (2005). Historical Perspectives of the Operational Art. Washington D.C.: Center of Military History.
- Kretchik, Walter E. (December 1998), "Whither SAMS?", Army Magazine, 48 (12): 31–34
- Liewer, Steve (21 May 2010). "SAMS Graduates Largest Class". United States Army Combined Arms Center.
- Naylor, Sean D. (29 April 1991), "'Jedi Knights' Put Together a Winning Plan", Air Force Times, 38: 10, 16
- Plank, Lori (16 April 2010). "Inside Modern Military Training" (PDF). Kansas City Star. Kansas: U.S. Army Combined Arms Center. Archived from the original (PDF) on 7 November 2010.
- Romjue, John L. (1996). American Army Doctrine for the Post-Cold War. TRADOC Historical Monograph Series. Fort Monroe, Virginia: Headquarters, United States Army Training and Doctrine Command, Military History Office.
- Romjue, John L.; Canedy, Susan; Chapman, Anne W. (1993). Prepare the Army for War: A Historical Overview of the Army Training and Doctrine Command, 1973–1993. TRADOC Historical Monograph Series. Fort Monroe, Virginia: Headquarters, United States Army Training and Doctrine Command, Office of the Command Historian.
- Scales, Robert H. (October 2009), "Return of the Jedi", Armed Forces Journal: 22–25, 45
- Stewart, Richard W., ed. (2010). The United States Army in a Global Era, 1917–2008. American Military History. Vol. II (Second ed.). Washington D.C.: United States Army Center of Military History.
- Stewart, Michael David (2010). Raising a Pragmatic Army: Officer Education at the U.S. Army Command and General Staff College (PhD Diss.). University of Kansas.
- United States Army Command and General Staff College. "SAMS Tri-Fold: SAMS Historical Narrative" (PDF). School of Advanced Military Studies. United States Command and General Staff College.
- United States Army Command and General Staff College (December 2005). Self-Study Report. Fort Leavenworth, Kansas: United States Army Command and General Staff College.
- United States Army Command and General Staff College (8 January 2008). Intermediate Level Education: Self-Study Report. Fort Leavenworth, Kansas: United States Army Command and General Staff College.
- United States Army Command and General Staff College (13 July 2011). "Combined Arms Research Library Digital". Kansas: U.S. Army Command and General Staff College. Archived from the original on 9 September 2016.
- United States Army Training and Doctrine Command (2003). Transforming the Army: TRADOC's First Thirty Years, 1973–2003. TRADOC Historical Monograph Series. Fort Monroe, Virginia: Headquarters, United States Army Training and Doctrine Command, Military History Office.
- United States, Congress, Another Crossroads? Professional Military Education Twenty Years after the Goldwater-Nichols Act and the Skelton Panel. 111th Congress. 1st Sess. 20 May 2009. United States Government Printing Office. Washington D.C. 2010.
- United States Army Command and General Staff College Public Affairs (10 August 2010). "SAMS 25th Anniversary Celebration: A Quarter Century of Excellence in Education". United States Army Combined Arms Center.
- U.S. News & World Report (1992). Triumph Without Victory: The Unreported History of the Persian Gulf War. New York and Toronto: Random House. ISBN 0-8129-1948-3.
- Wass de Czege, Huba (November 1984). "How to Change an Army". Military Review: 33–49.
- Wass de Czege, Huba (July–August 2009). "The School of Advanced Military Studies: An Accident of History". Military Review. 89 (4): 102–106.
- Wass de Czege, Huba (13 June 1983). Army Staff College Level Training Study (Final Report). Fort Leavenworth, Kansas: United States Army Command and General Staff College.
- West, Joe (29 April 1991), "AF to Develop Soldier-scholar", Air Force Times, 38: 10, 16.
