= Conrad Schmidt =

Conrad Schmidt may refer to:

- Conrad Schmidt (social activist)
- Conrad Schmidt (Medal of Honor)
- Conrad Schmidt (economist)
