= Camp Stambaugh (Wyoming) =

U.S. army outpost in the Wyoming Territory

Coordinates: 42.503567°N 108.680666°W

Camp Stambaugh was a U.S. army outpost in the Wyoming Territory located in the mining district near South Pass City and Atlantic City in the Wind River Range.

== Background ==
The camp was established in June 1870 to stop hostilities between miners and Native Americans and named for First Lieutenant Charles B. Stambaugh who was killed protecting settlers from a raid the month before. The camp was established and manned by Company B of the 2nd Cavalry from Fort Bridger. Camp Stambaugh was abandoned in 1878 as the mining town populations plummeted.
