= Eli L. Huggins =

American general and Medal of Honor recipient (1842–1929)

Eli Lundy Huggins
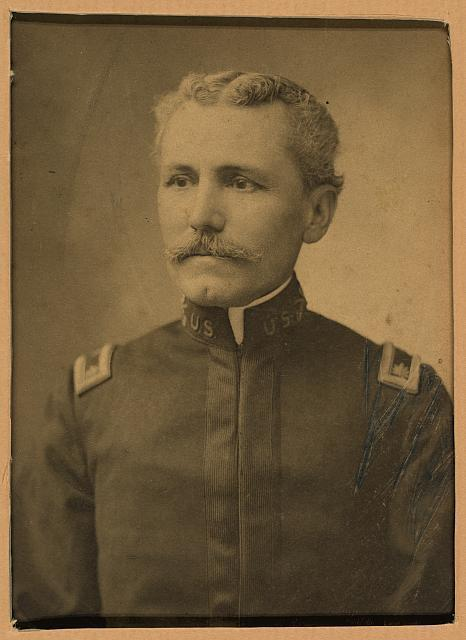
- Huggins in 1898
- Born: August 1, 1842; Schuyler County, Illinois, U.S.
- Died: October 22, 1929 (aged 87); San Diego, California, U.S.
- Burial place: Mountain View Cemetery, Oakland, California U.S.
- Military career
- Allegiance: United States
- Branch: United States Army (Union Army)
- Service years: 1861–1903
- Rank: Brigadier General
- Units: 1st Minnesota Heavy Artillery Regiment; 2nd Cavalry Regiment; 6th US Cavalry
- Commands: 8th Volunteer Infantry Regiment; 3rd Cavalry Regiment
- Conflicts: American Civil War: Chickamauga campaign; Battle of Chickamauga; American Indian Wars; Spanish–American War; Boxer Rebellion; Filipino–American War
- Awards: Medal of Honor

Eli Lundy Huggins (August 1, 1842 – October 22, 1929) was an American Brigadier General and author who received the Medal of Honor for his actions during the Indian Wars. He was also the commander of the 8th Volunteer Infantry Regiment during the Spanish–American War.

== Family ==
Eli was born on August 1, 1842, at Schuyler County, Illinois as one of eight children of the Reverend Alexander and Lydia Huggins (née Pettijohn). His family became one of the first to settle at Nicolet County, Minnesota with his parents becoming missionaries at Lac qui Parle and Traverse des Sioux. While stationed at Alaska, Huggins had formed a relationship with a woman from Alaska of possible Inuit or Russian descent with their only son, Zenoah Alexander Huggins.

== Military career ==
After briefly attending Hamline University, Huggins dropped out and enlisted as a private in the 2nd Minnesota Volunteer Infantry in July 1861. He was promoted to corporal in 1862, and was captured at the Battle of Chickamauga, but released the following year. In March 1865, he was commissioned first lieutenant in the 1st Minnesota Heavy Artillery Regiment, before mustering out the following September.

Thanks to a recommendation by congressman William Windom, Huggins was commissioned as a second lieutenant of the 2nd Artillery Regiment in February 1866, and regained his wartime rank by the end of the year. While in the army, he attended Mankato Normal School now called Minnesota State University, Mankato from 1872 to 1875. He was then promoted to captain of the 2nd Cavalry Regiment in April 1879. In October 1882 he was assigned as Assistant Inspector General in the Department of the Columbia. He was promoted to major in January 1897, and served as aide-de-camp to general Nelson A. Miles until Miles' appointment as Commanding General of the Army.

At the outbreak of the Spanish–American War, Huggins was appointed colonel of the 8th US Volunteer Infantry in May 1898. After the war he reverted to his pre-war rank and served with the 6th US Cavalry in the Boxer Rebellion. He was again promoted to colonel in November 1901 and received command of his old regiment, the 2nd Cavalry. During the Filipino–American War, Huggins served as the Lieutenant Colonel of the 3rd Cavalry Regiment. He was finally promoted to brigadier general on February 22, 1903, and retired the next day.

== Career as an author ==
Huggins also published several works and books throughout his life with his first work being an article titled Men and Things in Alaska that was published in the periodical, The Citizen Magazine. He has been credited with over 31 works of various genres in his name with his most famous one being titled Winona, A Dakota Legend and Other Poems in 1890.

== Post-retirement ==
Following his retirement, Huggins became a real-estate investor in the Indian Territory, living at Muskogee with his sister, Jane Sloan Huggins Holtsclaw. He could also speak various languages including French, Spanish, Portuguese, Russian and Sioux. By 1910, he lived at Mission Valley, San Diego but had moved to East San Diego, California, in 1920. He was buried at Mountain View Cemetery in Oakland, California.

== Medal of Honor citation ==
Rank and organization: Captain, 2nd U.S. Cavalry. Place and date: Near O'Fallons, Mont., April 1, 1880. Entered service at: Minnesota. Birth: Schuyler County, Ill. Date of issue: November 27, 1894.

Surprised the Indians in their strong position and fought them until dark with great boldness.
