= William H. Jones (Medal of Honor) =

American soldier in the U.S. Army

- Born: 1842; Davidson County, North Carolina, U.S.
- Died: December 23, 1911 (aged 69); Efland, North Carolina, U.S.
- Burial place: Efland Methodist Church Cemetery
- Military career
- Branch: United States Army
- Service years: c. 1877 – 1878
- Rank: Private
- Unit: 2nd U.S. Cavalry
- Conflicts: Indian Wars; Black Hills War; Nez Perce War
- Awards: Medal of Honor

William H. Jones (1842 – December 23, 1911) was an American soldier in the U.S. Army who served with the 2nd U.S. Cavalry during the Indian Wars. He received the Medal of Honor for gallantry in separate battles against the Sioux and the Nez Perce in the Rocky Mountains during the summer of 1877.

== Biography ==
William H. Jones was born in Davidson County, North Carolina in 1842. He later enlisted in the U.S. Army in Louisville, Kentucky and joined the 2nd U.S. Cavalry. Jones later became a regimental farrier and a sergeant. While on frontier duty in the Rocky Mountains in 1877, he was twice cited for gallantry against the Plains Indians in the Montana and the Idaho territories. The first occurred against the Sioux at Little Muddy Creek on May 7, and the second against the Nez Perce at Camas Meadows on August 20, 1877. It was during this last battle that Jones suffered a serious knee injury. For his actions at these engagements, he received the Medal of Honor on February 28, 1878. Jones returned to North Carolina after leaving the military and died in Efland, North Carolina on December 23, 1911, a day before Christmas Eve. He was buried at the Efland Methodist Church Cemetery.

== Medal of Honor citation ==
Rank and organization: Farrier, Company L, 2d U.S. Cavalry. Place and date: At Little Muddy Creek, Mont., 7 May 1877- at Camas Meadows, Idaho, 20 August 1877. Entered service at: Louisville, Ky. Birth. Davidson County, N.C. Date of issue: 28 February 1878.

Citation:

Gallantry in the attack against hostile Sioux Indians on May 7, 1877 at Muddy Creek, Mont., and in the engagement with Nez Perces Indians at Camas Meadows, Idaho, on 20 August 1877 in which he sustained a painful knee wound.

== See also ==
- List of Medal of Honor recipients for the Indian Wars
