= Conrad Schmidt (Medal of Honor) =

US Union Army soldier

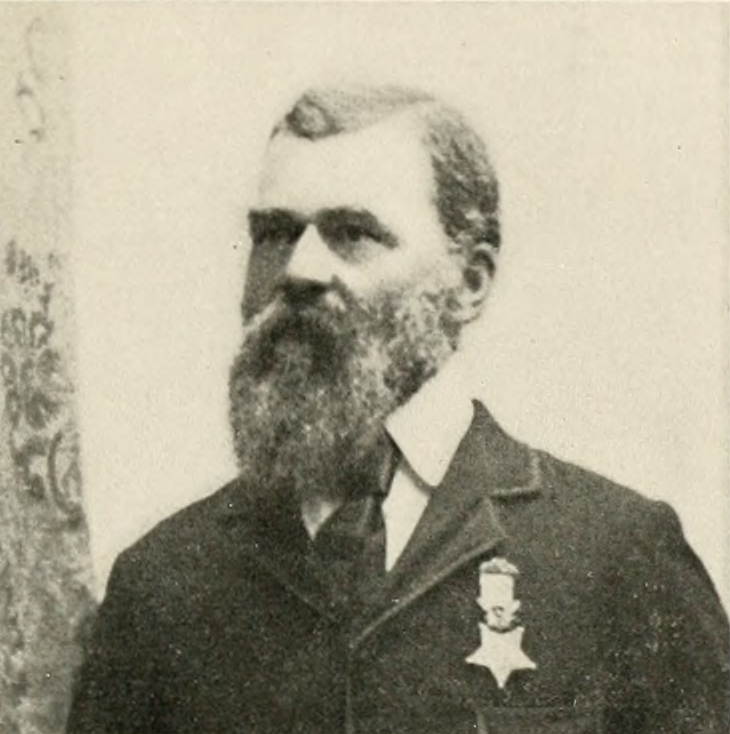
- Medal of Honor recipient Conrad Schmidt
- Born: February 27, 1830; Kingdom of Württemberg, German Confederation
- Died: December 26, 1908 (aged 78); Kansas
- Burial place: Catholic Cemetery, Ogden, Kansas
- Military career
- Allegiance: United States
- Branch: United States Army; Union Army
- Service years: 1861 - 1866
- Rank: Quartermaster Sergeant
- Unit: 2nd U.S. Cavalry
- Conflicts: American Civil War • Battle of Opequon
- Awards: Medal of Honor

Conrad Schmidt (February 27, 1830 – December 26, 1908) was a Union Army soldier during the American Civil War. He received the Medal of Honor for gallantry during the Battle of Opequon, more commonly called the Third Battle of Winchester in Virginia on September 19, 1864.

Schmidt joined the army from Fort Leavenworth in February 1861, and was discharged in December 1866.

== Medal of Honor citation ==
"The President of the United States of America, in the name of Congress, takes pleasure in presenting the Medal of Honor to First Sergeant Conrad Schmidt, United States Army, for extraordinary heroism on 19 September 1864, while serving with Company K, 2d U.S. Cavalry, in action at Winchester, Virginia. First Sergeant Schmidt went to the assistance of his regimental commander, whose horse had been killed under him in a charge, mounted the officer behind him, under a heavy fire from the enemy, and returned him to his command."

== See also ==
- List of Medal of Honor recipients
- List of American Civil War Medal of Honor recipients: Q–S
