= Gleicherwiesen =

- Ortsteil of Römhild
- Coat of arms
- Interactive map of Gleicherwiesen
- Location within Germany Location within Thuringia
- Coordinates: 50°21′48″N 10°38′2″E
- Country: Germany
- State: Thuringia
- District: Hildburghausen
- Town: Römhild

Population
  - Total: 350
- Time zone: UTC+01:00 (CET)
  - Summer (DST): UTC+02:00 (CEST)
- Postal codes: 98646
- Dialling codes: 036875
- Vehicle registration: HBN
- Website: www.stadt-roemhild.de

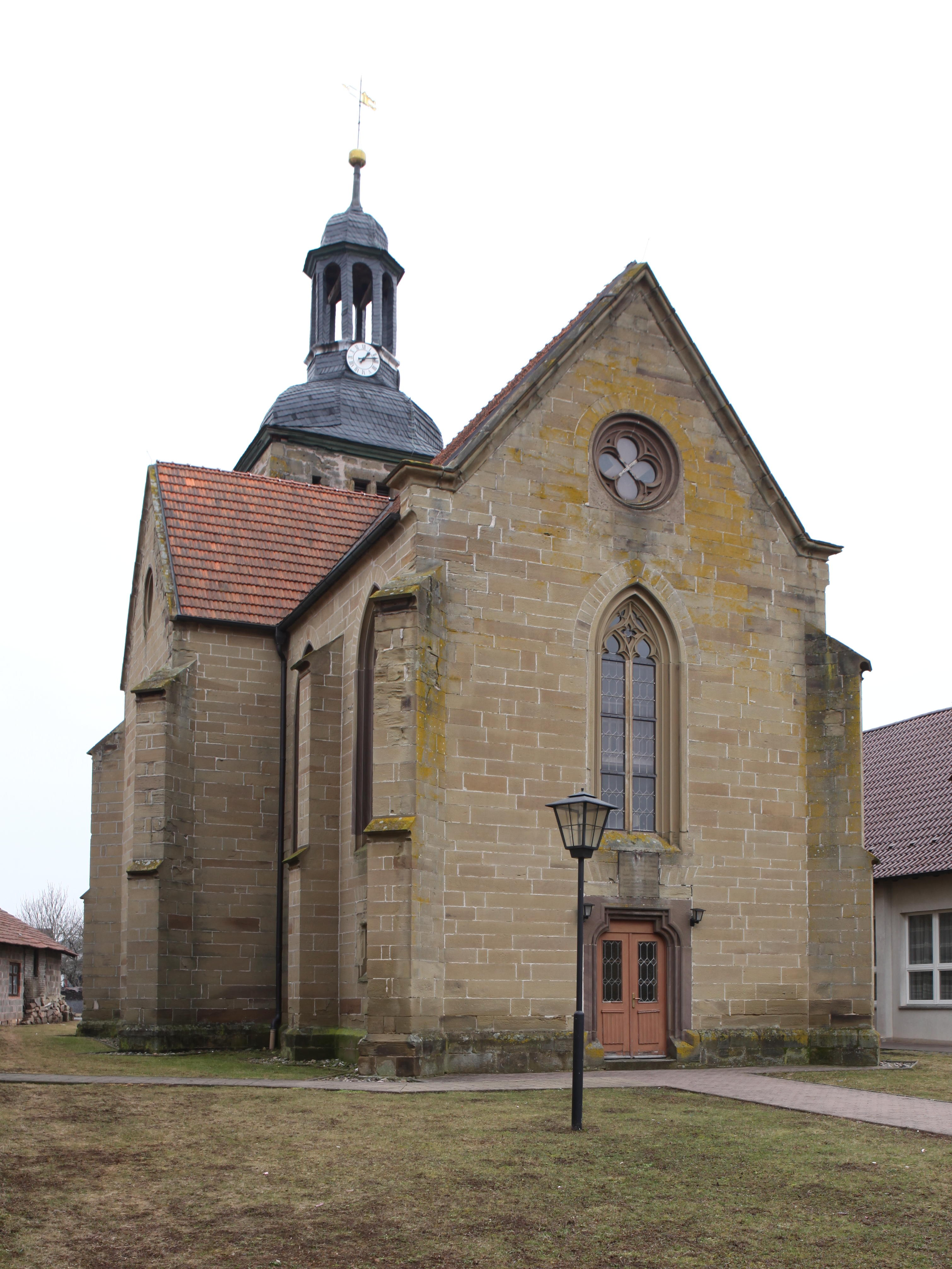
St. Nikolaus

Gleicherwiesen in Thuringia is a part of the town Römhild.

== History ==
First mentioned in 1100 under the name Glychon, in 1182, Glychon an der Wysen (today Gleicherwiesen) and Glychon am Berg (today Gleichamberg) are referenced. Over much of history, the village was under control of von Bibra family (c.1356 - 1850). Much of the manor house still exists.

The village received the right to hold a market in 1743 and commerce flourished. Before World War I, about one third of the population was Jewish. A Jewish cemetery is outside of town.

The church, which stands somewhat in the middle of the village, was built onto the tower in 1843.

== Coat of arms ==
The beaver is the symbol of the von Bibra (Bibra is old German word for beaver), who owned the village for a long time. The linden tree symbolises the ancient linden tree in the village. The green and silver division of the shield symbolises the meadows and pastures (Wiesen).
