= Vigneulles =

- Commune
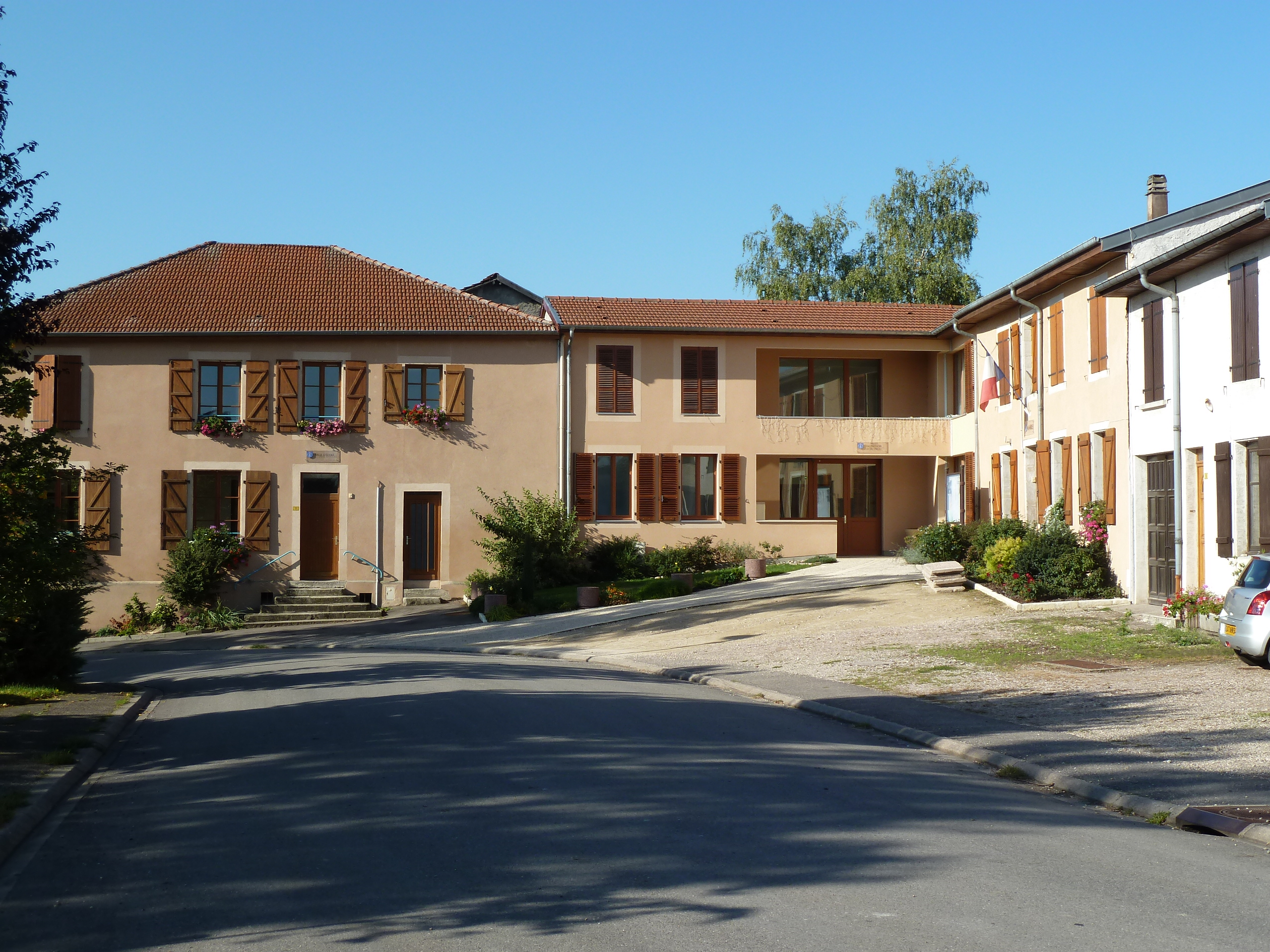
- The town hall in Vigneulles

- Coat of arms
- Location of Vigneulles
- Location within France Location within Grand Est
- Coordinates: 48°33′41″N 6°19′55″E
- Country: France
- Region: Grand Est
- Department: Meurthe-et-Moselle
- Arrondissement: Lunéville
- Canton: Lunéville-2
- Intercommunality: CC Meurthe, Mortagne, Moselle

Government
  - Mayor (2020–2026): Philippe Daniel
- Area^{1}: 5.57 km^{2} (2.15 sq mi)
- Elevation: 200 m (660 ft)
- Highest elevation: 335 m (1,099 ft)
- Lowest elevation: 207 m (679 ft)
- Population (2023): 235
  - Density: 42.2/km^{2} (109/sq mi)
- Time zone: UTC+01:00 (CET)
  - Summer (DST): UTC+02:00 (CEST)
- INSEE/Postal code: 54565 /54360
- ^{1} French Land Register data, which excludes lakes, ponds, glaciers > 1 km^{2} (0.386 sq mi or 247 acres) and river estuaries.

Vigneulles (French pronunciation: [viɲœl]) is a commune in the Meurthe-et-Moselle département in north-eastern France.

In the past, inhabitants of Vigneulles were known by their neighbours as poussais ("chasers"), having taken up pitchforks to chase off the villagers from Barbonville who had come to steal their supposedly miracle performing statue of the Virgin.

== See also ==
- Communes of the Meurthe-et-Moselle department
