= Leonard D. Holder Jr. =

United States Army general

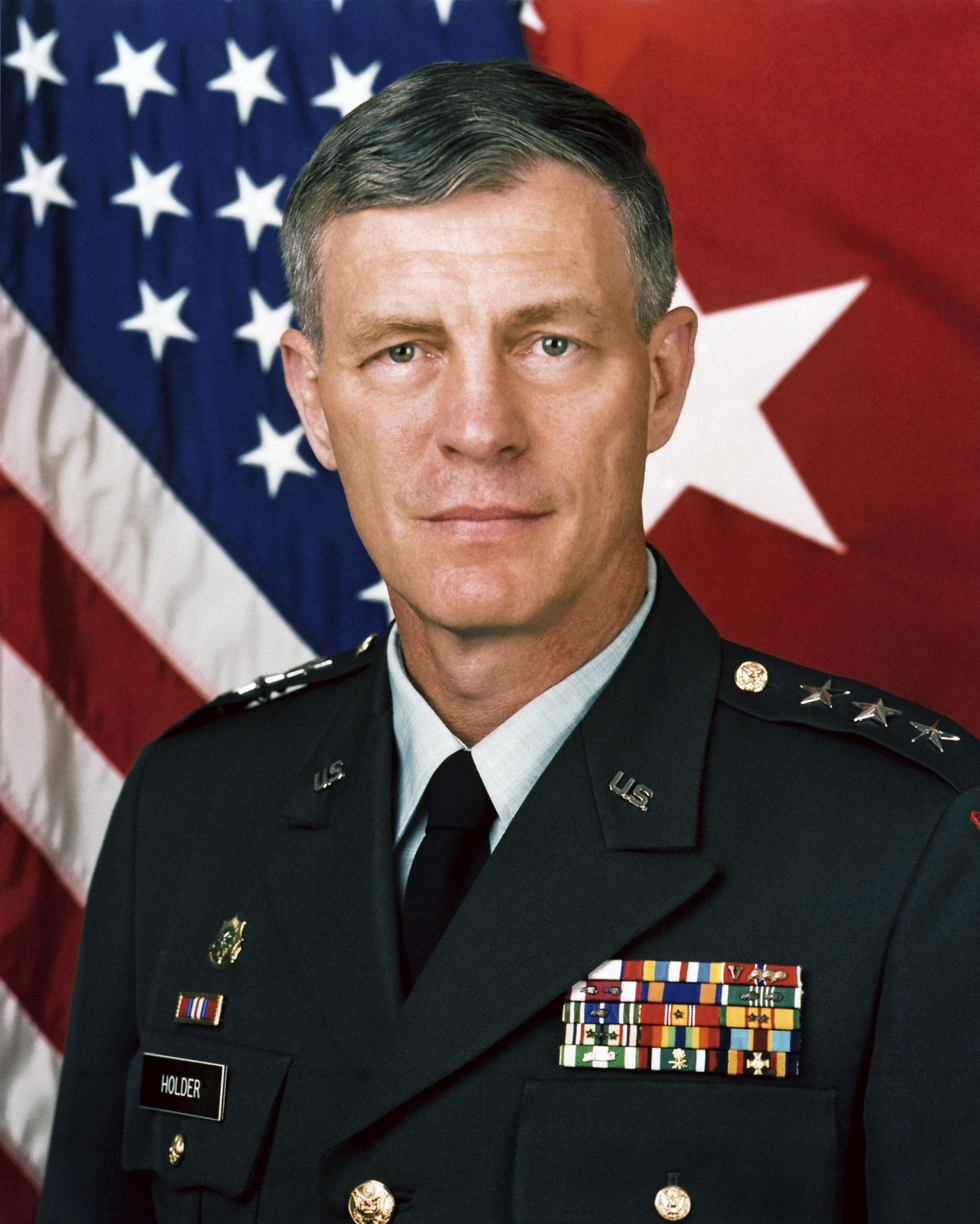
- Born: January 19, 1944 (age 82); San Antonio, Texas, U.S.
- Military career
- Allegiance: United States
- Branch: United States Army
- Service years: 1966–1997
- Rank: Lieutenant General
- Commands: Troop K, 3rd Reconnaissance Squadron, 2nd Armored Cavalry Regiment; Troop C, 1st Squadron, 4th Cavalry Regiment; 1st Squadron, 3rd Armored Cavalry Regiment; 2nd Armored Cavalry Regiment; 3rd Infantry Division (Mechanized); Commandant of the United States Army Command and General Staff College
- Conflicts: Colonel Holder was the Regimental Commander of 2nd Armored Cavalry Regiment during Operation Desert Storm. His unit led the VII Corps effort on the famous "left hook" that engaged the Tawalkana Division of the Republican guard, rendering it combat ineffective and allowing the 1st and 3rd Armored Divisions to conduct a passage of lines and continue the fight.
- Other work: Colonel Holder was instrumental in developing FM 100-5, the Airland Battle concept that replaced the "Active Defense" strategy used until the mid 1980s. This required buy-in by the USAF, and centered around getting inside the enemy decision making loop, and using tactical strikes to delay or disrupt follow on enemy units.

Leonard Donald Holder Jr. (born January 19, 1944) is a retired lieutenant general in the United States Army. He was Commandant of the United States Army Command and General Staff College from July 19, 1995, to August 7, 1997.

As a colonel, Holder commanded the United States 2nd Armored Cavalry Regiment in the Battle of 73 Easting

He was inducted into the Fort Leavenworth Hall of Fame.
