= List of Native American leaders of the Indian Wars =

This is a list of Native American leaders who participated in the American Indian Wars, which occurred throughout the early 17th century until the early 20th century. This list includes both chiefs and others.

Name	Life	Years Active	Tribe Of Origin	Comments
Black Elk	1863–1950	1870–1890s	Lakota	A prominent Wichasha Wakan of the Oglala Lakota, he was a combatant at the Battle of the Little Bighorn. During the late 1880s, he was involved in the Ghost Dance movement and was injured at the Wounded Knee Massacre.
Black Hawk	1767–1838	1810s–1830s	Sauk	Sauk chief who led the Sauk and Fox tribes against the United States off and on during the early 19th century, from the War of 1812 until his eventual defeat following the Black Hawk War.
Black Kettle	c. 1803–1868	1850s–1860s	Cheyenne	Cheyenne chief who resisted the American settlement of the Kansas and Colorado territories during the 1860s. After his village was destroyed during the Sand Creek massacre, he participated in the Colorado War with the Comanche and Kiowa negotiating several treaties with the United States before his death at Battle of Washita River.
Blue Jacket	c. 1743 – c. 1810	1770s–1800s	Shawnee	
Billy Bowlegs	c. 1810–1859	1830s–1860s	Seminole	
Joseph Brant	c. 1743–1807	1750s–1800s	Mohawk	
Buckongahelas	c. 1720–1805	1770s–1800s	Lenni-Lenape	
Lone Horn	c. 1790–1877	1810s–1870s	Minneconjou Teton Lakota	Chief of Minneconjou teton lakota Indians, signed the treaty of fort Laramie in 1868. Father of Touch the Clouds and Spotted Elk, uncle to Crazy Horse
Captain Jack	c. 1837–1873	1860s–1870s	Modoc	
Mangas Coloradas	c. 1793–1863	1820s–1850s	Apache	
Cochise	c. 1805–1874	1860s–1870s	Apache	
Cornplanter	c. 1750s–1831	1816–1831	Seneca	
Cornstalk	c. 1720–1777	1760s–1770s	Shawnee	
Crazy Horse	c. 1840–1877	1850s–1870s	Lakota	
Geronimo	1829–1909	1850s–1880s	Apache	
Chief Joseph	1840–1904	1870s	Nez Perce	Chief Joseph led his people on a 1700 mile trail to escape the US army.
Little Crow	c. 1810-1863	1860s	Mdewakantunwan Dakota	Dakota chief of the Mdewakantunwan tribe of Dakota, led an uprising in 1862 called “Little Crow’s War” in Minnesota lasting for 8 weeks.
Chief Logan	c. 1725–1780	1770s	Mingo	Mingo chief who took part in Lord Dunmore's War.
Lozen	c. 1840 – after 1887	1840s–1880s	Apache	Sister of Chihenne-Chiricahua Apache chief Vittorio, Lozen was a prominent prophet and warrior against Mexican incursions into the southwest United States.
Neolin	fl. 1761–1763	1760s	Lenni-Lanape	Known as the "Delaware Prophet", he founded a movement during the mid-18th century to reject European goods and a return to traditional way of life. His teachings would later be adopted by a number of tribal chief, most notably Pontiac.
Opchanacanough	c. 1554–1646	1500s–1600s	Pamunkey	Pamunkey chief after the death of his brother, Chief Powhatan. He led the Indian massacre of 1622.
Osceola	1804–1838	1830s	Seminole	The principal leader of the Second Seminole War, he led a small band successfully resisting the U.S. Army for over two years before his capture in 1837.
King Philip	c. 1639–1676	1660s–1670s	Wampanoag	The second son of Massasoit, Metacomet (or King Philip) led an open rebellion against the English Massachusetts Bay Colony known as King Philip's War.
Pontiac	c. 1720–1769	1760s	Odawa	Odawa chief who resisted British settlement of the Great Lakes region during the Pontiac's Rebellion.
Rain-in-the-Face	c. 1835–1905	1860s–1870s	Hunkpapa Lakota	A war chief of the Lakota, he took part in Red Cloud's War and Black Hills War.
Red Cloud	1822–1909	1860s–1890s	Oglala Lakota	A chief of the Oglala Lakota, he was one of several Lakota leaders who opposed the American settlement of the Great Plains winning a short-lived victory against the U.S. Army during Red Cloud's War.
Red Jacket	c. 1750–1830	1770s–1790s	Seneca	
Major Ridge	c. 1771–1839	1790s–1830s	Cherokee	
Sakayengwaraton	1792–1886	1810s	Mohawk	
Shingas	fl. 1740–1763		Lenape	
Chief Seattle	c. 1780–1866		Suquamish-Duwamish	
Sitting Bull	c. 1831–1890	1870s–1890s	Lakota	
Spotted Elk	c. 1826–1890	1870s–1890s	Lakota	Son of Miniconjou Lakota chief Lone Horn, he was an ally of Sitting Bull and Crazy Horse although he himself saw no action during the Black Hills War. A major figure of the Ghost Dance movement of the late 1880s, he was one of several chiefs killed during the Wounded Knee Massacre.
Tamanend	c. 1628 – c. 1701	1680s–1690s	Lenni-Lenape	
Tecumseh	c. 1768–1813	1800s–1810	Shawnee	Shawnee chief who attempted to organize a vast alliance of Native American tribes in the eastern United States during the early 19th century. Siding with Great Britain during the War of 1812, he led the Shawnee against the United States until his death at the Battle of the Thames.
Tenskwatawa	1775–1834	1800s–1830s	Shawnee	Shawnee chief known as "The Prophet" who was an ally of his brother Tecumseh, together founding Prophetstown.
Touch the Clouds	c. 1838–1905	1851–1904	Minneconjou	Minneconjou Lakota chief; supposedly was seven feet tall. Cousin to Crazy Horse and son of Lone Horn
Wovoka	c. 1856–1932	1880s	Northern Paiute	Paiute spiritual leader and prophet; founder of the Ghost Dance movement whose religious teachings became popular among the tribes of the Great Plains and western United States until the Wounded Knee Massacre in 1890.
