= Lame Deer (disambiguation) =

Lame Deer was the Miniconjou Lakota leader during the Great Sioux War of 1876

Lame Deer may also refer to:

- Lame Deer, Montana, Northern Cheyenne Reservation, Rosebud County, Montana, USA
- John Fire Lame Deer (1903–1976), Lakota holy man, subject of Lame Deer, Seeker of Visions: the life of a Sioux medicine man by Richard Erdoes
- Archie Fire Lame Deer (1935–2001), son of John Fire Lame Deer, subject of Gift of Power: the life and teachings of a Lakota medicine man by Richard Erdoes
