= Battle of Little Muddy Creek =

Battle of the American Indian Wars

- Part of the Great Sioux War
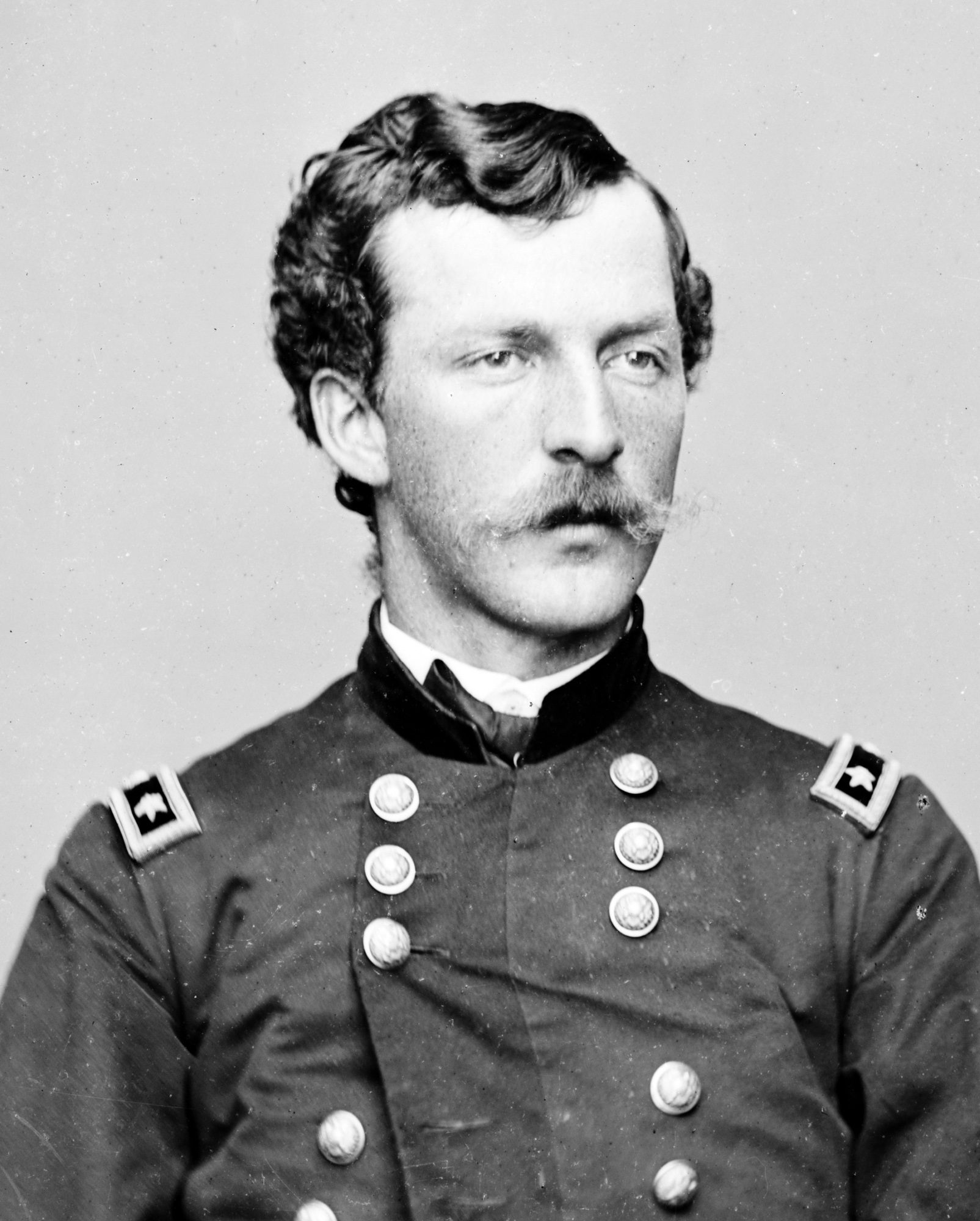
Date	May 7–8, 1877
Location	Little Muddy Creek, Montana Territory; (near present-day Lame Deer, Montana)
Result	American victory

Belligerents
United States	Miniconjou Lakota

Commanders and leaders
Nelson A. Miles	Lame Deer †

Strength
± 480	± 200

Casualties and losses
4 killed; 10 wounded	15 killed; 20 wounded; 40 captured

The Battle of Little Muddy Creek, also known as the Lame Deer Fight, was fought on May 7–8, 1877, by United States soldiers and scouts against a village of Miniconjou Lakota. The battle occurred near Little Muddy Creek in Montana Territory, near present-day Lame Deer, Rosebud County.

== Background ==
On May 1, 1877, Colonel Nelson A. Miles led a mixed force of his own 5th Regiment, the 22nd Regiment, and the 2nd Cavalry Regiment out of Fort Keogh in search of Miniconjou Lakota under Lame Deer. On the Tongue River, Indian scouts found a trail heading west to Rosebud Creek, and Miles followed with his command of 471 officers and enlisted men.

== Battle ==
Spotting a camp of 61 lodges on Little Muddy Creek, Colonel Miles left his infantry and moved in with cavalry under Captain Edward Ball and mounted infantry under Lieutenant Edward W. Casey. The mounted force reached Lame Deer's sleeping village before dawn at 4:30 a.m. Company H of the 2nd Cavalry under Lieutenant Lovell H. Jerome and the mounted infantry under Casey began the fight with a mounted charge into the village. One of the army's Indian scouts, Hump, called to the Lakota and Cheyenne that Miles wanted to negotiate with them.

Lame Deer approached Miles accompanied by his nephew Iron Star and two others. Miles told Lame Deer to lay down his rifle, which he did, but cocked and facing forward. When White Bull, one of Miles's scouts, tried to take Iron Star's rifle, he fired, with the bullet going through White Bull's coat. Lame Deer grabbed his weapon on the ground and fired it at Miles, the bullet just missing him and killing his orderly, Private Charles Shrenger. Chaos ensued. Several soldiers and Lakota were hit in the gunfire. Lame Deer was shot down by a volley of 17 bullets fired by men of Company L, 2nd Cavalry. Companies F, G, and L of the 2nd Cavalry then attacked the small and defenseless Indian village, destroying it and capturing about 450 horses, killing half of them.

== Aftermath ==
The army had four men killed and ten wounded in the engagement, while the Lakota suffered from 5–14 killed, and about 20 wounded and 40 captured. Five Congressional Medals of Honor were awarded to soldiers for their actions during the battle:

1. Henry Wilkens – first sergeant, Company L, 2nd Cavalry
2. William H. Jones – sergeant, Company L, 2nd Cavalry
3. Harry Garland – corporal, Company L, 2nd Cavalry
4. William Leonard – private, Company L, 2nd Cavalry
5. Samuel D. Phillips – private, Company H, 2nd Cavalry

A Purple Heart was awarded to David L. Brainard on January 27, 1933; one of only 12 awarded for the American Indian Wars.

== Order of battle ==
United States Army, Colonel Nelson A. Miles

- 2nd Cavalry Regiment, Companies F, G, H, L, Captain Edward Ball
- 5th Infantry Regiment, Companies B, H
- 22nd Infantry Regiment, Companies E, F, G, H
- Indian Scouts: Brave Wolf and White Bull, Northern Cheyenne and Hump, Miniconjou Lakota

Native Americans, Chief Lame Deer

- Miniconjou Lakota

== Bibliography ==
- Greene, J. (2000). "The Lame Deer Fight". Lakota and Cheyenne: Indian Views of the Great Sioux War. Norman: OU Press. §11. pp. 134–147. ISBN 9780806132457.
- Michno, G. (2003). Encyclopedia of Indian Wars: Western Battles and Skirmishes, 1850–1890. Missoula: Mountain Press. ISBN 9780878424689.
