= Gladys Laubin =

Gladys Laubin (1907–1996) was a performer of Plains Indian dances along with her husband Reginald Laubin. They were part of a movement of white Americans who sought to preserve the traditional cultures of Indigenous people by bringing them to white audiences.

== Early life ==
Gladys Laubin was born in 1907. In 1922, while attending Norwich Free Academy, she met her future husband Reginald Laubin, who was attending Norwich Art School. His interest in "Indian dance" interested her, and she quickly decided to pursue it as well. The two married in October 1928.

== Career ==
The Laubins began regular performances of Plains Indian dances sometime before 1928. They originally performed for local civic clubs, school groups, museums, Scout troops, and churches. In 1928, the pair decided to quit their jobs and perform professionally. Their performances were praised based on their stage presence and dramatic flair, with one Hartford Courant review in 1929 describing their "sinuous and muscular grace." In addition to dancing, Gladys played the tom-tom and sang.

In 1929, the pair took a belated honeymoon to Colorado to learn from Ralph Hubbard and attend events by local Indigenous people. Gladys recorded resentment from the local Indigenous people and described them as "difficult to approach." The couple's dancing was also critiqued by the local Indigenous people, which Hubbard responded to by reminding them that their "work is largely interpretive" but ultimately "good" and would be improved by more time spent around Indigenous people.

In 1930, the couple adopted stage names--Gladys became known as Wianna, or Little Woman.

The 1930s were also when the pair began to focus most on Plains Indian culture. This focus led them to the Standing Rock Reservation in 1934, where they met One Bull. Another turning point came when the Laubins visited Standing Rock Indian Reservation in 1934. There they met One Bull, a nephew of Sitting Bull and a veteran of the Battle of the Little Bighorn. Disappointed to see One Bull wearing white clothing, Laubin lent him his dance outfit for a photo. When the Sioux man saw Laubin's shield with its drawing of a buffalo bull, he said that Laubin had written his name, One Bull. Laubin claimed that One Bull took the drawing as a sign that the couple had been sent by a higher force to represent Sioux people. The next day, One Bull and his family adopted the Laubins. One Bull gave Laubin his own name, Tatanka Wanjila (One Bull), and to Gladys he gave his mother's name, Wiyaka Wastewin (Good Feather Woman). This meeting became crucial to Reginald Laubin's later storytelling, and the details were embellished as time passed. In an early letter to Stanley Vestal, Laubin wrote that "One Bull adopted us and gave me his own name and Mrs. Laubin that of his mother." Later stories included a legal adoption into the Standing Rock Sioux (in 1934), comments from One Bull about their dancing (in 1944), and suggestions of divine intervention (in 1976). Despite this theatricality, the Laubins maintained a close relationship with One Bull for decades, as reflected in their correspondence.

The couple's correspondence shows appreciation and positive regard from many contemporaneous Indigenous people of the northern plains. This positive regard may have come from the way white audiences responded to the Laubins' performances, which was with sympathy and admiration for Plains Indian cultures.

By the late 1930s, the Laubins began to make high-profile appearances and gain greater media attention in New York. They performed at Times Hall in 1947, promoting themselves as honorary members of the Western Sioux who had spent time living with these people and learning their ways. This performance secured their position as serious professionals unlike any other Indian lore enthusiasts. They published three books with the University of Oklahoma, all successful--the books on archery and tipis remained standard through at least 2008. They also published three short educational films with the University of Oklahoma, titled The Old Chief's Dance, Talking Hands, and War Dance.

From the 1950s to the 1980s, the Laubins performed every summer at Jackson Lake Lodge. They gave their final performance there in 1988.

In 1972, the Laubins received the Capezio Award for their contributions to American dance.

Gladys Laubin died in 1996.

== Legacy ==
Although the Laubins were extremely well-received in their time, more recent scholarship has questioned the impact of their work on Indigenous peoples. Historian Clyde Ellis argues that their work suggested that Indigenous people belonged in the past tense and made it difficult for Indigenous people to take their place in the modern world. Their intentions to preserve Indigenous culture were sincere, but their programs were still not as authentic or accurate as they promoted them to be. Additionally, Janet Catherine Berlo remarks on the paternalism in their book Indian Dances of North America--they noted that "the Indians must be encouraged" to preserve their own dancing at a time when a new wave of scholarship that include Native performers was already growing.

== Bibliography ==
- The Indian Tipi, Reginald Laubin & Gladys Laubin, University of Oklahoma Press, Norman, 1957
- Indian Dances of North America, Reginald Laubin & Gladys Laubin, University of Oklahoma Press, Norman, 1977
- American Indian Archery, with Reginald Laubin & Gladys Laubin, University of Oklahoma Press, Norman, 1980
