= Touch the Clouds =

Minneconjou headman (c.1838–1905)

- Minneconjou headman
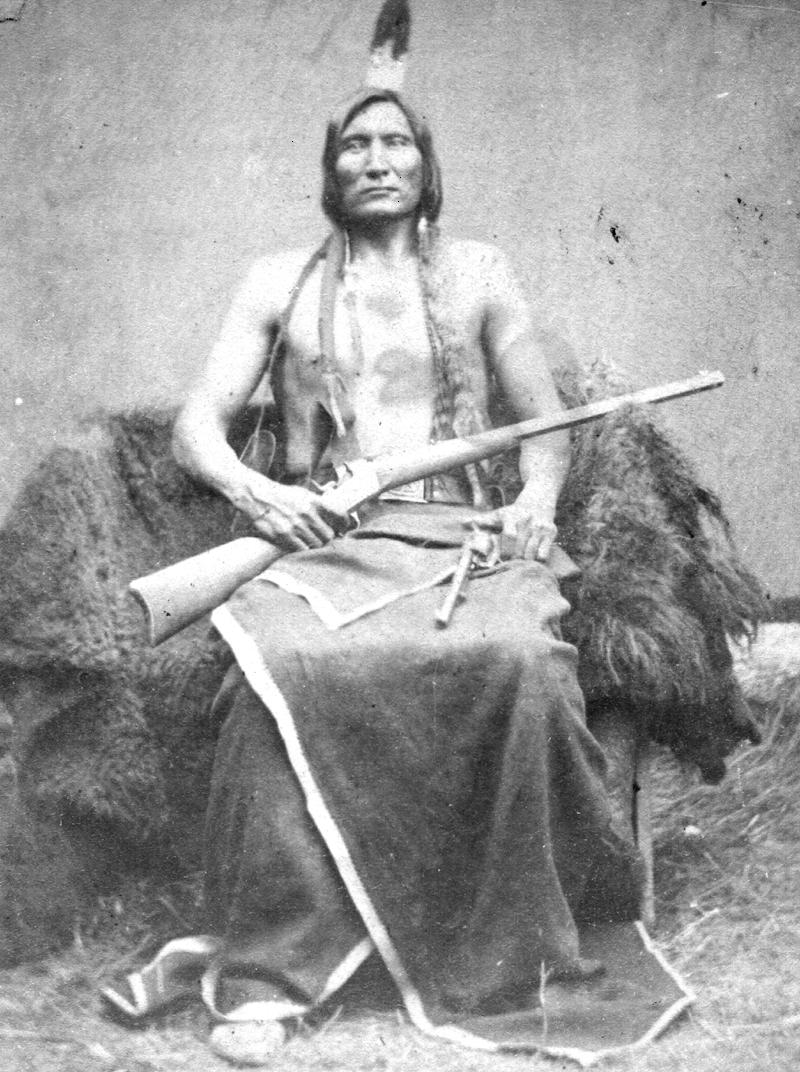
- By James H. Hamilton, taken at the Spotted Tail Agency, Nebraska, in the fall of 1877
- Successor: Amos Charging First
- Born: c. 1838; Great Sioux Nation
- Died: September 5, 1905 (aged 66–67); Cheyenne Riverside Indian Reservation, South Dakota
- Spouse: Spotted on the Ground
- Father: Lone Horn
- Mother: Stands on the Ground

Touch the Clouds (Lakota: Maȟpíya Ičáȟtagya or Maȟpíya Íyapat'o) (c. 1838 – September 5, 1905) was a chief of the Minneconjou Teton Lakota (also known as Sioux) known for his bravery and skill in battle, physical strength and diplomacy in counsel. The youngest son of Lone Horn, he was brother to Spotted Elk, Frog, and Roman Nose. There is evidence suggesting that he was a cousin to Crazy Horse.

When Touch the Clouds's Wakpokinyan band split in the mid-1870s, the band traveled to the Cheyenne River Agency. He assumed the leadership of the band in 1875 after the death of his father and retained leadership during the initial period of the Great Sioux War of 1876-77. After the Battle of the Little Bighorn, he took the band north, eventually surrendering at the Spotted Tail Agency, where he enlisted in the Indian Scouts. However, not long after being present at the death of Crazy Horse, Touch the Clouds transferred with his band back to the Cheyenne River Agency.

Touch the Clouds became one of the new leaders of the Minneconjou at the Cheyenne River Agency in 1881, keeping his position until his death on September 5, 1905. Upon his death his son, Amos Charging First, took over as the new chief.

== Rise to leadership ==
Born between 1837 and 1839, Touch the Clouds was the youngest son of the influential headman Lone Horn, leader of a Minneconjou band called the Wakpokinyan (Flies Along the Stream). Touch the Clouds was known for his height and great strength, to which his name relates. Lieutenant Henry R. Lemly, who met Touch the Clouds in 1877, described him as a Minneconjou "of magnificent physique, standing 6 feet 9 inches in his moccasins, and without an ounce of surplus flesh, weighing 300 pounds".

By the time Touch the Clouds reached his thirties, he had earned the respect of his peers and had been selected as the head of one of the tribe's warrior societies. In this role, he often led war parties against enemy tribes. White Bull later recalled an occasion in 1872 when Touch the Clouds led a horse-raiding party but decided to turn back upon discovering that they were greatly outnumbered by the Crow.

The crisis over the increasing European-American presence on the northern Great Plains caused growing dissension among the various Lakota bands as they debated what to do. The Wakpokinyan appear to have split, with part of the band (including Touch the Clouds) going into the Cheyenne River Agency on the Missouri River. A portion led by Lame Deer chose to remain out. Lone Horn struggled to maintain dialogue between the various factions of Minneconjou and their relatives, part of his long record as a Lakota diplomat. After Lone Horn died in 1875, the mantle of leadership fell to his son, just as the US Army was beginning its campaign against the non-treaty Cheyenne and Lakota bands.

== Great Sioux War of 1876–77 ==
At the beginning of the Great Sioux War of 1876-77, Touch the Clouds stayed with his band at the Cheyenne River Agency through that summer. Shortly after word of Custer's defeat at the Little Bighorn reached the reservation, Touch the Clouds pleaded with army officers at the nearby post: "Have compassion on us. Don't punish us all because some of us fought when we had to." Believing that agency bands were supporting the "hostiles", the army prepared to disarm the friendly Lakota and confiscate their ponies. In late September 1876, suspicious of the Army's intentions, Touch the Clouds led a breakout of Minneconjou and Sans Arc who fled the agency, abandoning their lodgepoles and other possessions in their hurried flight north.

The arrival of these refugees, including Touch the Clouds, Roman Nose, Bull Eagle, Spotted Elk and other headmen, introduced a more moderate element into the leadership of the northern villages. In October 1876, the combined force fought troops in several skirmishes along the new road to the Tongue River Cantonment. After Crazy Horse and Sitting Bull departed with their bands, representatives of the Minneconjou met with Colonel Nelson Miles to discuss the possibility of surrender. By February 1877, Touch the Clouds was camped near Short Pine Hills on the Little Missouri River with about 60 or 70 lodges. Here, he met the famed Brulé leader, Spotted Tail, in a five-day council. He agreed to take his band in to surrender at the Spotted Tail Agency in northwestern Nebraska. They arrived on April 14, 1877, and Touch the Clouds was the first to ride forward. "I lay down this gun," he announced to all who could hear, "as a token of submission to Gen. Crook, to whom I wish to surrender."

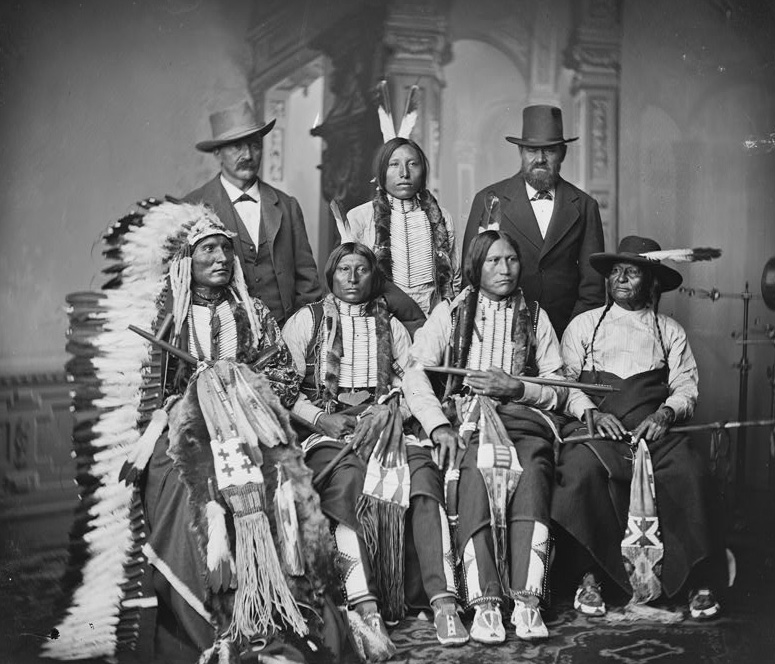
Touch the Clouds (seated at left with headdress), photo taken fall 1877, during his visit to Washington, D.C. as a delegate to meet with President Hayes

In the months that followed, Touch the Clouds and the Minneconjou lived peacefully at the Spotted Tail agency. The interpreter at Spotted Tail, Louis Bordeaux, described the Minneconjou leader as "an honorable and peaceable Indian, a man of good character, a very fine man, deprecated hostilities and was a peacemaker." The army persuaded him to enlist in the Indian Scouts. Touch the Clouds served as the first sergeant for Company E.

Touch the Clouds' relationship with Army officials soured in late August 1877 when he and Crazy Horse were asked to lead scouts north to fight Chief Joseph and the Nez Perce. Four days later, the army attempted to arrest Crazy Horse, but he slipped away to the Spotted Tail Agency. Touch the Clouds accompanied his friend back to Camp Robinson, where Crazy Horse was fatally bayonetted when army soldiers attempted to force him into the guardhouse. Touch the Clouds was allowed to remain with Crazy Horse that night until the Oglala died. Placing his hand on Crazy Horse's chest, Touch the Clouds said, "It is good: he has looked for death, and it has come." Touch the Clouds went to Washington, D.C. as a delegate the following month.

In October 1877, the Red Cloud and Spotted Tail Agencies were removed to the Missouri River, during which time Touch the Clouds and his band joined the Oglala. Many of the northern bands that had surrendered the previous spring broke away. They headed north to join Sitting Bull in Canada, where he had gone after the Battle of the Little Bighorn. Touch the Clouds was able to keep most of his band quiet and prevent them from leaving. He asked that they be transferred back home to the Cheyenne River Agency. Dr. James Irwin, agent at Red Cloud, supported the transfer. He noted that Touch the Clouds had been "very obedient and orderly during his stay with me and with his band remained behind when all the others left here."

== Cheyenne River Reservation ==
Touch the Clouds and his band finally returned in February 1878 to the Cheyenne River Reservation in central South Dakota. He lived there the remainder of his life. By the spring of 1882, the last remaining Minneconjou bands had returned to Cheyenne River, bringing together the tribe for the first time in several decades. By this time, only three of the traditional six headmen of the tribe were still alive. In 1882, the Minneconjou either affirmed or appointed new leaders to fill vacancies. Touch the Clouds was confirmed as a "shirt wearer" to fill the position of his late father. The other new leaders selected included White Bull, Big Crow, White Swan and Touch the Bear. At the ceremony, the new leaders sang the following song: "It is hard to be chief; But I do my best to be a chief."

In 1898, Touch the Clouds traveled to Omaha, Nebraska as part of the Trans-Mississippi and International Exposition, where he was photographed by Frank A. Rinehart.

Touch the Clouds continued to be a vocal advocate for his people for the remainder of his life. In 1884, Rev. Addison Foster visited the Cheyenne River Reservation. Following a church service, Touch the Clouds remained behind "to say that he felt the importance of this new way and that he wished for himself and his people schools and churches." He died on September 5, 1905, on Cherry Creek River, South Dakota.

Touch the Clouds was married at least twice. He had several daughters and at least one son. His oldest son, Amos Charging First, succeeded his father as a community leader, the next in the dynasty of Minneconjou headmen starting with the great Lone Horn.
