= Paul Swan (Lakota leader) =

Paul Swan (Lakota: Maǧáska, 1838? – September 30, 1900) was a prominent Minneconjou Lakota headman on the Cheyenne River Reservation.

== Early life ==
Born about 1838, he was the son of the influential headman Chief White Swan, one of six hereditary chiefs of the Minneconjou (a.k.a. Howoju or Owoju) 1866. White Bull later recalled that the elder White Swan "in particular hated the whites."

By the time of the Great Sioux War of 1876-77, however, White Swan's position had moderated and he had settled at the Cheyenne River Agency on the Missouri River. His sons, however, including Paul Swan a.k.a. Little Swan, Fine Weather and Puts on His Shoes, remained out with the non-treaty bands. Paul fought at the Battle of Rosebud and the Battle of the Little Bighorn. Following the death of his father in 1877, Paul Swan assumed the leadership role of his family band.

== Cheyenne River Reservation ==
It is uncertain when Paul Swan and his brothers surrendered at the Cheyenne River Agency. They may have come in with the large number of Minneconjou who surrendered in the spring of 1877 or they could have gone to Canada with Sitting Bull and not returned until the surrenders in 1881–82. By 1886, Paul Swan was living at Cheyenne River.

In 1881, the Minneconjou leadership gathered at Cheyenne River to select new slcapshirt wearers, symbols of leadership among the Lakota. With only three of the original chieftains still living, the tribe decided to select replacements. Paul Swan was selected to fill the vacancy of his father. Other headmen selected included Touch the Clouds, White Bull, Big Crow and Touch the Bear.

Paul Swan received an allotment in the Cherry Creek area of South Dakota where he raised his family. He died September 30, 1900.
