= Paul Swan =

Paul Swan may refer to:

- Paul Swan (Lakota leader)
- Paul Swan (dancer)
