= Black Moon (person) =

Lakota military leader (1821-1893)

Black Moon (Lakota: Wí Sápa; c. 1821–March 1, 1893) was a Miniconjou Lakota headman with the northern Lakota during the nineteenth century, not to be confused with the Hunkpapa leader (Oni Sapa) by the same name.

== Biography ==
Virtually nothing is known of Black Moon's early years. He had risen to a position of influence among his tribe by 1869 when he was present at the appointment of Sitting Bull as head war leader of the Lakota.

By the time of the Great Sioux War of 1876–77, this fifty-five-year-old headman was leader of a small Miniconjou band that chose to remain away from the Cheyenne River Agency. Black Moon is listed as one of the Miniconjou leaders who had joined the northern village by the early summer of 1876 and was present at the Battle of the Little Bighorn. He and his family fled to Canada in 1877, joining Sitting Bull near Wood Mountain.

When majority of the northern Lakota elected to surrender in 1880–81, Black Moon decided to remain in Canada, as did No Neck and a Brulé named Black Bull. He and his family lived near Moose Jaw and Willow Bunch and established relationships with Canadians in the region. Black Moon's daughter, Mary, married a corporal in the Royal Mounted Police stationed at nearby Fort Walsh. Black Moon finally departed Canada for the U.S. in the spring of 1889 with eleven lodges. Intercepted by soldiers, they were allowed to continue on to the Standing Rock Agency two weeks later. Black Moon and his family were transferred to the Cheyenne River Agency in October 1890. Part of his family traveled with Big Foot when he fled the agency during the Ghost Dance troubles. According to Dickson, "Black Moon's wife, daughter and son were killed" at Wounded Knee; and "another son and other family members were wounded." Afterwards, survivor Alice War Bonnet Charging Cloud reported seeing Black Moon with his brothers, Iron Horn and Wood Pile, at Pine Ridge, according to her son, William War Bonnet.

Black Moon lived the remainder of his life along Cherry Creek on the Cheyenne River Reservation.
