= Samuel D. Phillips =

- Born: c. 1845; Butler County, Ohio
- Died: 1915 (aged 69–70); Saint Paul, Minnesota, U.S.
- Burial place: Oakland Cemetery (St. Paul, Minnesota), Saint Paul, Minnesota
- Military career
- Allegiance: United States of America
- Branch: United States Army
- Rank: Private
- Units: Company H, 2nd U.S. Cavalry
- Conflicts: Indian Wars
- Awards: Medal of Honor

Samuel D. Phillips (c. 1845 – 1915) was a Medal of Honor recipient in the United States Army during the Plains Indian Wars. While serving as a private in Company H, 2nd U.S. Cavalry, he fought in an action against Native Americans at the Battle of Little Muddy Creek in Montana Territory on May 7, 1877.

== Medal of Honor citation ==
Rank and organization: Private, Company H, 2d U.S. Cavalry. Place and date: At Muddy Creek, Mont., May 7, 1877. Entered service at: United States. Birth: Butler County, Ohio, United States. Date of issue: August 8, 1877.

Citation:

Gallantry in action.

== See also ==
- List of Medal of Honor recipients
