= White Bull =

Native American warrior and chief (1849–1947)

- Tȟatȟáŋka Ská
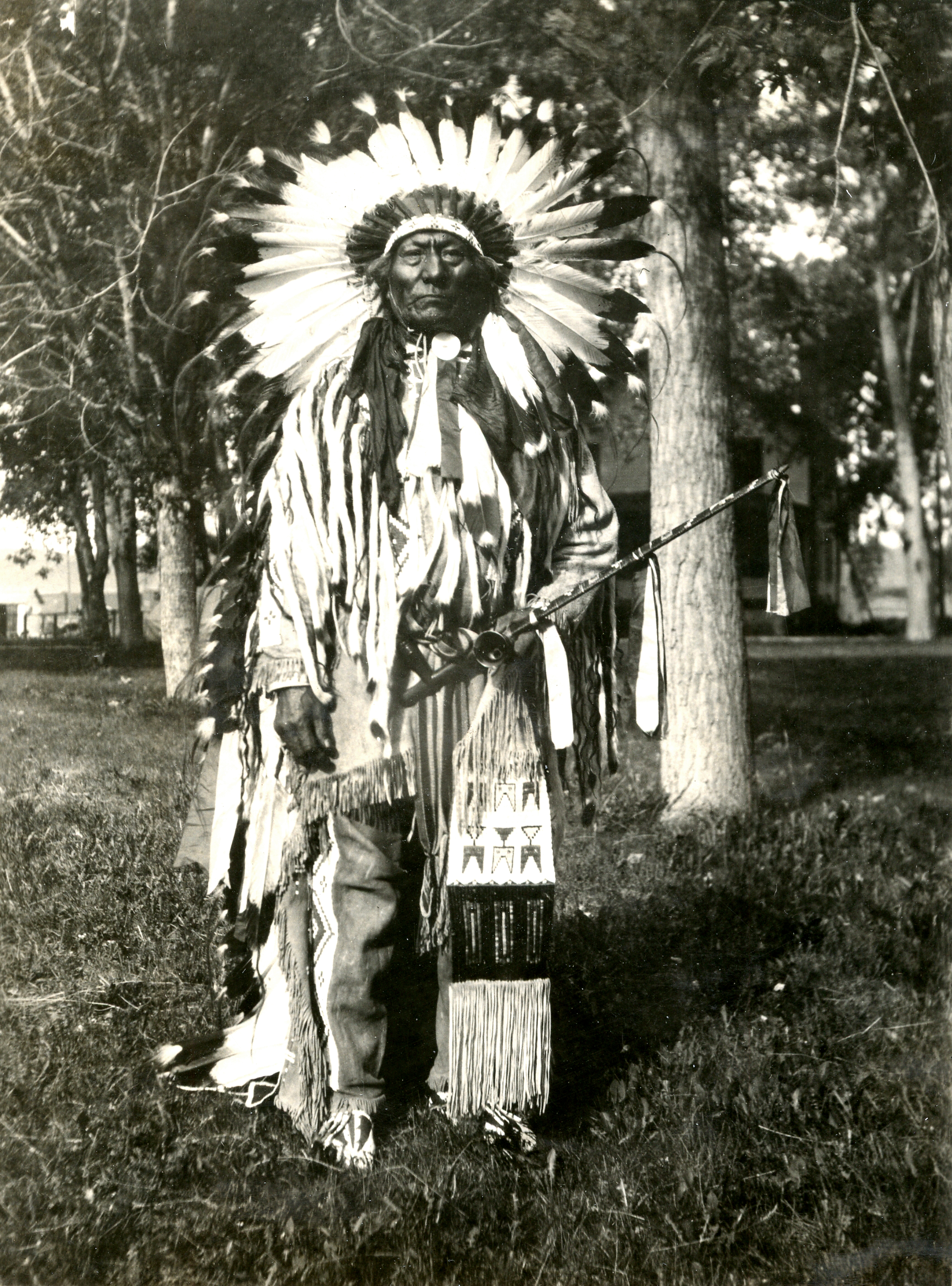
- White Bull in 1926

Personal details
- Born: April 1849 Black Hills
- Died: June 21, 1947 (aged 98) South Dakota
- Relations: One Bull (brother); Sitting Bull (uncle); Black Moon (uncle); Floris White Bull (descendant)
- Parents: Makes Room (father); Good Feather (mother)

White Bull (Lakota: Tȟatȟáŋka Ská; April 1849 – June 21, 1947), later known as Joseph White Cow Bull, was the nephew of Sitting Bull, and a famous warrior in his own right. White Bull participated in the Battle of the Little Bighorn on June 25, 1876.

== Early life ==
Born in the Black Hills in South Dakota, his original name was Bull-Standing-with-Cow. He came from a prominent Sioux family, being the son of Good Feather, Sitting Bull's sister, and Makes Room, a respected Miniconjou chief. His brother was One Bull. At just 16 years old, White Bull became a skilled warrior, earning recognition for his bravery by unseating three scouts from their horses and claiming 10 horses for his tribe. In honor of his achievements, his uncle Black Moon then gave him the name White Bull.

== Little Bighorn ==
For years, rumors circulated that White Bull claimed to have killed Lt. Col. George Armstrong Custer at the infamous battle. However, those who knew White Bull disputed this, stating that he never made such a boast, but rather acknowledged struggling with Custer. After the battle, White Bull joined his uncle, Hunkpapa Sioux leader Sitting Bull, while fleeing to Canada. Also, young Chief Solomon "Smoke" and Chief No Neck (Lakota: Tȟahú Waníče) (these two chiefs were the sons of the old Chief Smoke 1774–1864), fled with White Bull and Sitting Bull and their bands to Canada.

White Bull surrendered to government troops in 1876. He eventually became a chief, replacing his father Chief Makes Room upon his death. He acted as a judge of the Court of Indian Offenses, and was a proponent of Lakota land claims in the Black Hills. White Bull died in South Dakota in 1947.

White Bull's relationship to his uncle made him an important contributor to Stanley Vestal's biography of Sitting Bull.

== Popular culture ==
White Bull, played by Sal Mineo, was used as a character in the 1958 Disney Western adventure film Tonka.
