= Reginald Laubin =

American historian (1903–2000)

Reginald Laubin (December 4, 1903 – April 5, 2000) was an American writer, dancer, and expert on Native American culture and customs. With his wife, Gladys Laubin, he performed theatrical interpretations of Plains Indian dances. A white man, Laubin believed in Native American culture as an antidote to life in the modern world. Through his performances, he sought to preserve what he saw as Indian ways.

== Biography ==
=== Early life and marriage ===
Laubin grew up in Lima, Ohio. His parents, Karl and Carrie Laubin, were musicians, and they encouraged Reginald to pursue a career in music. Young Laubin had other ideas. He read Ernest Thompson Seton's Two Little Savages: Being the Adventures of Two Boys Who Lived as Indians Do, and What They Learned, and it influenced him to learn everything he could about Native Americans. At the age of eleven, Laubin watched a performance by Indian dancers. Afterward, he introduced himself to the dancers, and they taught him some steps. He decided that he too would become an "Indian dancer."

When Laubin was sixteen years old, his parents died of influenza. Laubin moved to Hartford, Connecticut, to live with his uncle. In 1922, he enrolled in Norwich Art School. There, he met Gladys Tortachel, who was attending the nearby Norwich Free Academy. The two began a partnership based on their mutual fascination with American Indian dance and culture. They married on October 20, 1928.

=== Dance career ===
By the time they married, the Laubins had already begun to experiment with a career as an Indian dance team. Shortly before their wedding, they quit their jobs and became professional Indian lore performers. The Great Depression made it difficult to earn a living as an artist, but Laubin found a niche by marketing the show as education. The duo appeared on stages for local civic clubs, school groups, museums, Scout troops, and churches. In a typical show, Laubin performed several carefully choreographed interpretations of Plains Indian dances while Gladys accompanied him on the tom-tom and occasionally sang. Most shows also included recorded orchestral music, an array of props and backdrops, and pyrotechnic blasts of smoke and fire. Laubin interspersed his dancing with talks on Plains Indian culture.

A turning point in Laubin's career came in the summer of 1929 when the couple traveled to Wyoming to visit Ralph Hubbard at his Ten-Sleep Ranch. Hubbard took the Laubins to local Indian events, taught them songs and dances, and helped them purchase props and costumes for their show. A highlight of the trip was a visit to Cheyenne Frontier Days. There, the Laubins watched an Indian parade and war dance, but the performance by Native Americans disappointed the couple. At the same event, an Indian woman criticized Laubin's dancing. After working with Hubbard, Laubin began to take a position as a savior of Indigenous culture, noting in an interview that he "had to teach members of the vanishing red race some of their own ceremonials," and that three months with Hubbard was worth three years on the reservation.

Another turning point came when the Laubins visited Standing Rock Indian Reservation in 1934. There they met One Bull, a nephew of Sitting Bull and a veteran of the Battle of the Little Bighorn. Disappointed to see One Bull wearing white clothing, Laubin lent him his dance outfit for a photo. When the Sioux man saw Laubin's shield with its drawing of a buffalo bull, he said that Laubin had written his name, One Bull. Laubin claimed that One Bull took the drawing as a sign that the couple had been sent by a higher force to represent Sioux people. The next day, One Bull and his family adopted the Laubins. One Bull gave Laubin his own name, Tatanka Wanjila (One Bull), and to Gladys he gave his mother's name, Wiyaka Wastewin (Good Feather Woman). Laubin used this adoption story, which he embellished over time, as a promotional tool and retold it at every performance.

After the Laubins performed at Times Hall in New York City in December 1947, they began to be regarded as serious artists. They built a cabin in Moose, Wyoming, in 1952 and hosted Indian lore enthusiasts who traveled from around the world. In 1953, the Laubins went on a five-month tour of Europe and North Africa with a company of nine Crow people. Beginning in 1955, the couple became the featured performers at Jackson Lake Lodge, and they continued to perform there for thirty-three years.

They also published three books with the University of Oklahoma, all successful—the books on archery and tipis remained standard through at least 2008. They also published three short educational films with the University of Oklahoma, titled The Old Chief's Dance, Talking Hands, and War Dance.

=== Retirement and death ===
The Laubins gave their last performance at Jackson Lake Lodge in 1988.

In 1996, Laubin donated his collection to the Spurlock Museum at the University of Illinois. The collection includes objects that the Laubins used in performances, some created by Native American artists and others created by the Laubins in traditional style. The Spurlock Museum, opened in 2002, named its Laubin Gallery of American Indian Cultures in the couple's honor.

Laubin died on Wednesday, April 5, 2000, at a hospital in Urbana, Illinois.

== Reception and legacy ==
=== Critical reception ===
Critics reviewed Laubin's dancing favorably. John Martin wrote for the New York Times, "Theoretically there is little to be said in defense of dancers who go about doing 'authentic' dances of other races. Why the same indefensibility does not attach itself to the Laubins it would be difficult to say, but it definitely does not."

Many contemporaneous Native American people appreciated Laubin's performances. This positive regard may have come from the way white audiences responded to the Laubins' performances, which was with sympathy and admiration for Plains Indian cultures.For example, Laubin claimed that at the 1947 Crow Fair, Crow leader Bird Horse led him around the dance arena and chided the younger Crows, "Look at him. He's nothing but a white man but he looks more real, more like early days, than you young fellows do."

In 1972, the Laubins received the Capezio Award for their contributions American dance.

=== Legacy ===
Laubin became an icon of the Indian lore movement. As such, he believed and promoted the assumptions that Indians were vanishing, that their way of life could be an antidote for the ills of white culture, and that whites could speak for Indians.

Although the Laubins were extremely well-received in their time, more recent scholarship has questioned the impact of their work on Indigenous peoples. Historian Clyde Ellis argues that their work suggested that Indigenous people belonged in the past tense and made it difficult for Indigenous people to take their place in the modern world. Their intentions to preserve Indigenous culture were sincere, but their programs were still not as authentic or accurate as they promoted them to be. Additionally, Janet Catherine Berlo remarks on the paternalism in their book Indian Dances of North America--they noted that "the Indians must be encouraged" to preserve their own dancing at a time when a new wave of scholarship that include Native performers was already growing.

== Bibliography ==
- The Indian Tipi, Reginald Laubin & Gladys Laubin, University of Oklahoma Press, Norman, 1957
- Indian Dances of North America, Reginald Laubin & Gladys Laubin, University of Oklahoma Press, Norman, 1977
- American Indian Archery, with Reginald Laubin & Gladys Laubin, University of Oklahoma Press, Norman, 1980
