= William Leonard (Medal of Honor) =

- Born: Ypsilanti, Michigan
- Military career
- Allegiance: United States of America
- Branch: United States Army
- Rank: Private
- Units: Company L, 2nd U.S. Cavalry
- Conflicts: Indian Wars
- Awards: Medal of Honor

William Leonard was a Medal of Honor recipient in the United States Army during the Plains Indian Wars. While serving as a private in Company L, 2nd U.S. Cavalry, he fought in an action against Indians at the Battle of Little Muddy Creek in Montana Territory on May 7, 1877.

== Medal of Honor citation ==
Rank and organization: Private, Company L, 2nd United States Cavalry. Place and date: At Muddy Creek, Montana, May 7, 1877. Entered service at: United States. Birth: Ypsilanti, Michigan, United States. Date of issue: August 8, 1877.

Citation:

Bravery in action.

== See also ==
- List of Medal of Honor recipients for the Indian Wars
