= Henry Wilkens =

- Born: 1855; Germany
- Died: August 2, 1895 (aged 40); Brooklyn, New York, United States
- Burial place: Cypress Hills National Cemetery
- Military career
- Allegiance: United States of America
- Branch: United States Army
- Service years: c. 1877–c. 1895
- Rank: Ordnance Sergeant
- Unit: 2nd U.S. Cavalry
- Conflicts: Indian Wars; Nez Perce War
- Awards: Medal of Honor

Henry Wilkens (1855 – August 2, 1895) was a German-born soldier in the U.S. Army who served with the 2nd U.S. Cavalry during the Nez Perce War. In the summer of 1877, he received the Medal of Honor for two separate engagements, Little Muddy Creek and Camas Meadows, against Lame Deer and the Nez Perce in the Idaho Territory. Wilkens was one of four men who received the award for taking part in the battle of Little Muddy Creek.

== Biography ==
Henry Wilkens was born in Germany in 1855, and later emigrated to the United States. While living in Pittsburgh, Pennsylvania, he enlisted in the U.S. Army and was sent out west to the frontier. He became a member of the 2nd U.S. Cavalry and eventually reached the rank of first sergeant. During the Nez Perce War, he was among the cavalry troopers which did battle with various small bands of renegade Indians hiding throughout the Idaho Territory. He was cited for bravery in two major engagements during the summer months of 1877. On May 7, Wilkens was among the soldiers who stormed Lame Deer's camp near Little Muddy Creek in the neighboring Montana Territory. Three months later, he led troops in routing the renegades at Camas Meadows in Idaho on August 20. Despite suffering a serious head injury, Wilkens remained with his company throughout the battle. This included participating in the pursuit of a captured mule train and defending his fellow soldiers when the company was surrounded by the Nez Perce for several hours. He received the Medal of Honor for both engagements on February 28, 1878. Wilkens was one of five men who received the award at Camas Meadows including Cpl. Harry Garland, Pvt. Samuel Phillips, Pvt. William Leonard and Farrier William Jones. Wilkens died in Brooklyn, New York on August 2, 1895, and buried at Cypress Hills National Cemetery. He was 40 years old.

He and the other MOH recipients of Camas Meadows were referenced in the 1998 historical novel Ashes of Heaven as part of Terry C. Johnston's Plainsmen Series.

== Medal of Honor citation ==
Rank and organization: First Sergeant, Company L, 2d U.S. Cavalry. Place and date: At Little Muddy Creek, Mont., 7 May 1877; at Camas Meadows, Idaho, 20 August 1877. Entered service at: ------. Birth: Germany. Date of issue: 28 February 1878.

Citation:

Bravery in actions with Indians.

== See also ==
- List of Medal of Honor recipients for the Indian Wars
