= John Fire Lame Deer =

Lakota holy man (1903–1976)

Tȟáȟča Hušté John Fire Lame Deer
- Born: Tȟáȟča Hušté; March 17, 1903; Rosebud Indian Reservation
- Died: December 14, 1976 (aged 73); Tripp, Hutchinson, Dakota Territory
- Other name: John Fire
- Children: Archie Fire Lame Deer
- Parents: Silas Fire Let-Them-Have-Enough (Hunkpapa Lakota) (father); Sally Red Blanket (Miniconjou Lakota) (mother)

John Fire Lame Deer (in Lakota Tȟáȟča Hušté; March 17, 1903 – December 14, 1976, also known as Lame Deer, John Fire and John (Fire) Lame Deer) was a Lakota holy man, member of the Heyoka society, grandson of the Miniconjou head man Lame Deer, and father of Archie Fire Lame Deer.

== Life ==
John Fire Lame Deer was a Mineconju-Lakota Sioux born on the Rosebud Indian Reservation. His father was Silas Fire Let-Them-Have-Enough. His mother was Sally Red Blanket. He lived with his maternal grandparents until he was 6 or 7, after which he was placed in a day school near the family until age 14. He was then sent to a boarding school, one of many run by the U.S. Bureau of Indian Affairs for Indian youth, which were designed to assimilate Native Americans into the dominant Euro-American culture after their forced settlement on reservations. He attended for six years without learning to read, write, or speak English.

Lame Deer's mother died of tuberculosis when he was 17. His father moved north to Standing Rock Indian Reservation soon after and left Lame Deer with land and livestock, which Lame Deer quickly sold.

=== Vision-seeking or hanblechia ===
At 16, Lame Deer participated in the vision-seeking ceremony or hanblechia, during which he decided to become a medicine man, or wičháša wakȟáŋ. After four days and nights alone, he had a vision of his great-grandfather Chief Tahca Ushte (Lame Deer), and consequently took his name.

=== Rodeo clown / Heyoka ===
Lame Deer's life as a young man was rough and wild; he traveled the rodeo circuit as a rider and later as a rodeo clown. He was also a member of the peyote church and tribal policeman. According to his personal account, he drank, gambled, womanized, and once went on a several-day-long car theft and drinking binge. He learned English during his wandering years, or oyumni. This adventurous quality aligned with the Lakota sacred figure of the heyoka or "holy clown," who is able to embody the whole spectrum of things, both good and bad.

== Political and spiritual work ==
Making his home at the Pine Ridge Reservation and traveling around the country, Lame Deer became known both among the Lakota and to the American public at a time when Indigenous culture and spirituality were going through a period of rebirth and the psychedelic movement of the 1960s had yet to disintegrate. He performed pipe ceremonies and often participated in American Indian Movement activist events, including sit-ins at the Black Hills. This land, sacred to the Lakota and a number of other Plains tribes, was legally owned by the Lakota before the United States government illegally seized it without compensation after discovering gold in the area. The U.S. Supreme Court found that the federal government "decided to abandon the Nation's treaty obligation to preserve the integrity of the Sioux territory" and used military force to seize the Black Hills. The Lakota continue to campaign for the return of the Black Hills. He was also present at the 1973 occupation of Wounded Knee.

== Lame Deer, Seeker of Visions ==
In 1972, Simon and Schuster published Lame Deer, Seeker of Visions, a collaboration between artist and author Richard Erdoes and Lame Deer. Erdoes' recorded interviews with Lame Deer are part of the Richard Erdoes Papers at the Beinecke Rare Book and Manuscript Library, Yale University.

The book recounts Lame Deer's life and provides insight to his belief in the power of ritual in life - each experience or stage completing and beginning a new circle. During his journey to be a teacher and a healer, he believed a medicine man ought to experience the full breadth of human experience. Erdoes writes of Lame Deer's opinions of Elk, Bear, Buffalo, Coyote, and Badger medicine, and the importance Lakota ceremonial traditions played in his later life and eventual understanding of the world.
