= Great Sioux War of 1876 =

Battles and negotiations between the US and the Lakota Sioux and Northern Cheyenne

- Part of the Sioux Wars and American Indian Wars
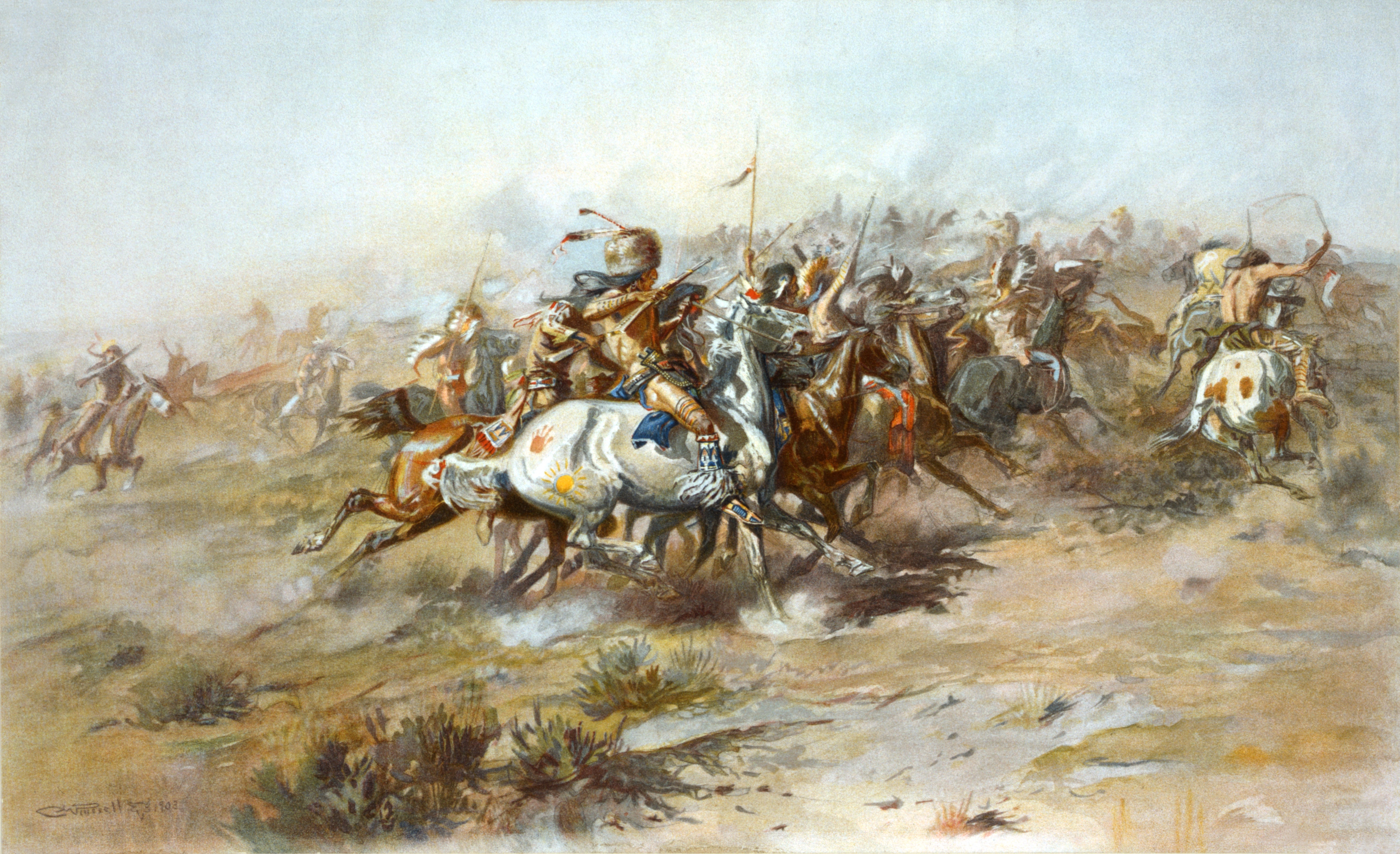
- The Custer Fight; Charles Marion Russell, 1903
Date	8 February 1876 – 5 May 1877 (1 year, 2 months and 4 weeks)
Location	Montana Territory, Dakota Territory, Wyoming Territory, Nebraska, Crow Indian Reservation
Result	United States victory

Belligerents
United States; Shoshone; Crow; Pawnee; Arikara	Lakota; Dakota; Cheyenne; Arapaho

Commanders and leaders
George Crook; Alfred Terry; George Custer †; Nelson Miles; Wesley Merritt; Joseph Reynolds; Plenty Coups	Crazy Horse (surrendered); Sitting Bull (surrendered); Little Wolf (surrendered); Dull Knife (POW)

Casualties and losses
300+ killed	265 killed

The Great Sioux War of 1876, also known as the Black Hills War, was a series of battles and negotiations that occurred in 1876 and 1877 in an alliance of Lakota Sioux and Northern Cheyenne against the United States. The cause of the war was the desire of the US government to obtain ownership of the Black Hills. Gold had been discovered in the Black Hills, settlers began to encroach onto Native American lands, and the Sioux and the Cheyenne refused to cede ownership. Traditionally, American military and historians place the Lakota at the center of the story, especially because of their numbers, but some Native Americans believe the Cheyenne were the primary target of the American campaign.

Among the many battles and skirmishes of the war was the Battle of the Little Bighorn – often known as Custer's Last Stand and the most storied of the many encounters between the US Army and mounted Plains Indians. Despite the Indian victory, the Americans leveraged national resources to force the Indians to surrender, primarily by attacking and destroying their encampments and property. The Great Sioux War took place under US Presidents Ulysses S. Grant and Rutherford B. Hayes. The Agreement of 1877 (19 Stat. 254, enacted February 28, 1877) officially annexed Sioux land and permanently established Indian reservations.

== Background ==
The Cheyenne had migrated west to the Black Hills and Powder River Country before the Lakota and introduced them to horse culture about 1730. By the late 18th century, the growing Lakota tribe had begun expanding its territory west of the Missouri River. They pushed out the Kiowa and formed alliances with the Cheyenne and Arapaho to gain control of the rich buffalo hunting grounds of the northern Great Plains. The Black Hills, located in present-day western South Dakota, became an important source to the Lakota for lodge poles, plant resources and small game.

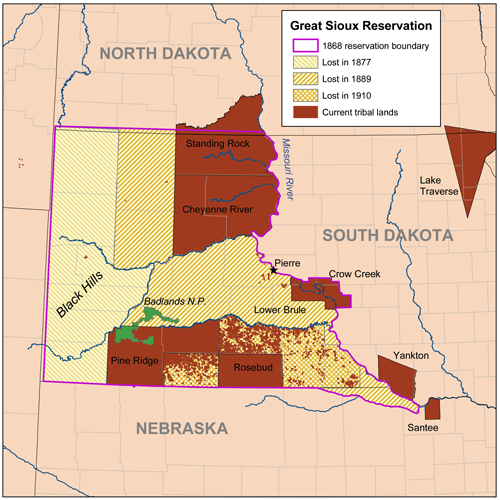
A map of the Great Sioux Reservation as established in 1868. "Unceded lands" for Cheyenne and Sioux use were west of the reservation in Montana and Wyoming. The desire of the U.S. government to obtain the Black Hills was the principal cause of the Great Sioux War.

By the early 19th century, the Northern Cheyenne became the first to wage tribal-level warfare. Because European Americans used many different names for the Cheyenne, the military may not have realized their unity. The US Army destroyed seven Cheyenne camps before 1876 and three more that year, more than any other tribes suffered in this period. From 1860 on, the Cheyenne were a major force in warfare on the Plains. "No other group on the plains achieved such centralized tribal organization and authority." The Fort Laramie Treaty of 1868, signed with the US by Lakota and Northern Cheyenne leaders following Red Cloud's War, set aside a portion of the Lakota territory as the Great Sioux Reservation. This comprised the western one-half of South Dakota, including the Black Hills region for their exclusive use. It also provided for a large "unceded territory" in Wyoming and Montana, the Powder River Country, as Cheyenne and Lakota hunting grounds. On both the reservation and the unceded territory, white men were forbidden to trespass, except for officials of the U.S. government.

The growing number of miners and settlers encroaching in the Dakota Territory, however, rapidly nullified the protections. The US government could not keep settlers out. By 1872, territorial officials were considering harvesting the rich timber resources of the Black Hills, to be floated down the Cheyenne River to the Missouri, where new plains settlements needed lumber. The geographic uplift area suggested the potential for mineral resources. When a commission approached the Red Cloud Agency about the possibility of the Lakota's signing away the Black Hills, Colonel John E. Smith noted that this was "the only portion [of their reservation] worth anything to them". He concluded that "nothing short of their annihilation will get it from them".

As a result, Cheyenne and Lakota began moving west into land belonging to smaller tribes. Most battles in the coming war would be fought "on lands those Indians had taken from other tribes since 1851". The resulting effect was resistance to the Lakotas from the local Crow tribe, which had treaty on the area. Already in 1873, Crow chief Blackfoot had called for U.S. military actions against the Indian intruders. The steady Lakota invasion into treaty areas belonging to the smaller tribes guaranteed that the United States would find allies in the Arikaras and the Crows who saw the Cheyenne and Lakotas as trespassers.]

In 1874, the government dispatched the Custer Expedition to examine the Black Hills. The Lakota were alarmed at his expedition. Before Custer's column had returned to Fort Abraham Lincoln, news of their discovery of gold was telegraphed nationally. The presence of valuable mineral resources was confirmed the following year by the Newton–Jenney Geological Expedition. Prospectors, motivated by the economic panic of 1873, began to trickle into the Black Hills in violation of the Fort Laramie Treaty. This trickle turned into a flood as thousands of miners invaded the Hills before the gold rush was over. Organized groups came from states as far away as New York, Pennsylvania, and Virginia.

Initially, the United States Army struggled to keep miners out of the region. In December 1874, for example, a group of miners led by John Gordon from Sioux City, Iowa, managed to evade Army patrols and reached the Black Hills, where they spent three months before the Army ejected them. Such evictions, however, increased political pressure on the Grant Administration to secure the Black Hills from the Lakota.

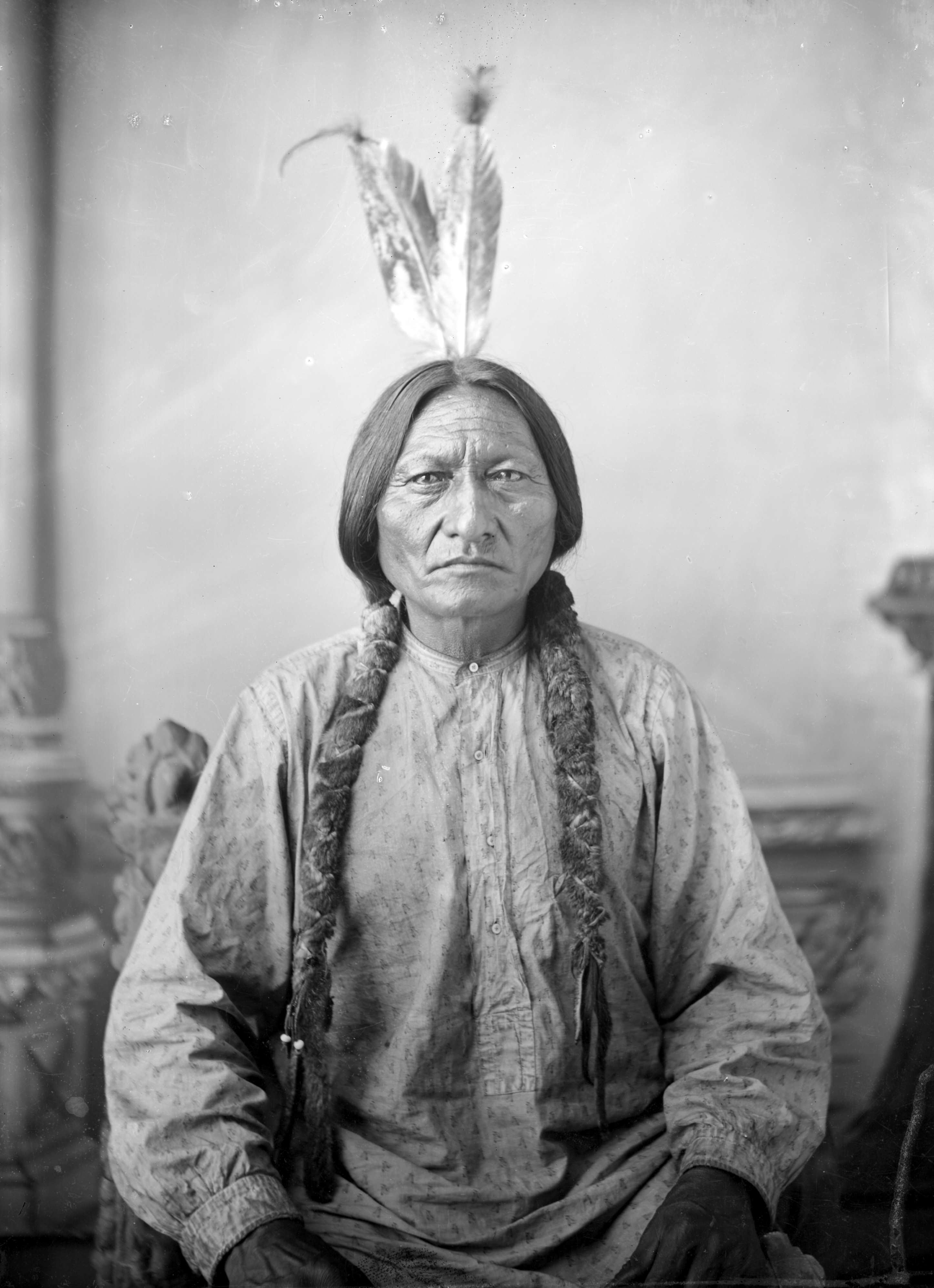
Sitting Bull, a Hunkpapa, was one of the principal Sioux leaders.

In May 1875, Sioux delegations headed by Spotted Tail, Red Cloud, and Lone Horn traveled to Washington, D.C. in an eleventh-hour attempt to persuade President Ulysses S. Grant to honor existing treaties and stem the flow of miners into their territories. They met with Grant, Secretary of the Interior Columbus Delano, and Commissioner of Indian Affairs Edward Smith. The US leaders said that the Congress wanted to pay the tribes $25,000 for the land and have them relocate to Indian Territory (in present-day Oklahoma). The delegates refused to sign a new treaty with these stipulations. Spotted Tail said, "You speak of another country, but it is not my country; it does not concern me, and I want nothing to do with it. I was not born there ... If it is such a good country, you ought to send the white men now in our country there and let us alone." Although the chiefs were unsuccessful in finding a peaceful solution, they did not join Crazy Horse and Sitting Bull in the warfare that followed.

Later that year, a US commission was sent to each of the Indian agencies to hold councils with the Lakota. They hoped to gain the people's approval and thereby bring pressure on the Lakota leaders to sign a new treaty. The government's attempt to secure the Black Hills failed. While the Black Hills were at the center of the growing crisis, Lakota resentment was growing over expanding US interests in other portions of Lakota territory. For instance, the government proposed that the route of the Northern Pacific Railroad would cross through the last of the great buffalo hunting grounds. In addition, the US Army had carried out several devastating attacks on Cheyenne camps before 1876.

== Combatants ==
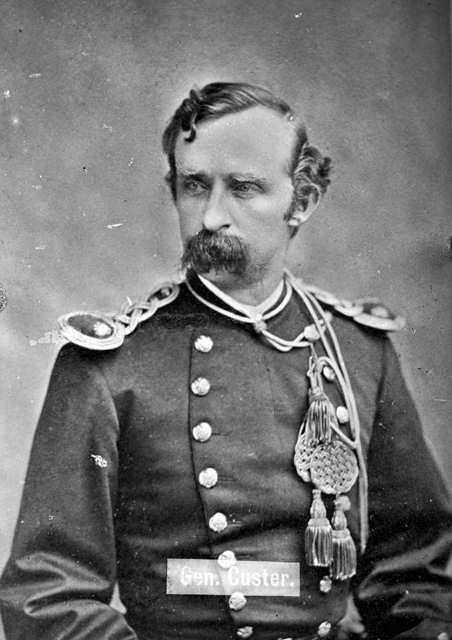
Lt. Col. George Armstrong Custer was killed at the Battle of the Little Bighorn along with 268 soldiers.

The number of Indian combatants in the war is disputed with estimates ranging from 900 up to 4,000 warriors. The seven bands of the Lakota Sioux in the 1870s numbered perhaps 15,000 men, women, and children, but most of them were living on the Great Sioux Reservation and were noncombatants. An Indian agent in November 1875 said the Indians living in the unceded areas numbered "a few hundred warriors." General Crook estimated that he might face up to 2,000 warriors. Most of the Sioux who remained in the unceded territory where the war would take place were Oglala and Hunkpapa, numbering about 5,500 in total. Added to this were about 1,500 Northern Cheyenne and Arapaho for a total hostile Indian population of about 7,000, which might include as many as 2,000 warriors. The number of warriors participating in the Battle of the Little Bighorn is estimated at between 900 and 2,000.

The Indians had advantages in mobility and knowledge of the country, but all Indians were part-time warriors. In spring, they were partially immobilized by the weakness of their horses which had survived the long winter on limited forage. Much of summer and fall they spent hunting buffalo to feed their families. About one half of the Indian warriors were armed with guns, ranging from repeating rifles to antiquated muskets, and one half with bows and arrows. The short, stout Indian bow was designed to be used from horseback and was deadly at short range, but nearly worthless against a distant or well-fortified enemy. Ammunition was in short supply. Indian warriors had traditionally fought for individual prestige, rather than strategic objectives, although Crazy Horse seems to have instilled in the Sioux some sense of collective endeavor. The Cheyenne were the most centralized and best organized of the Plains Indians. The Sioux and Cheyenne were also at war with their long-time enemies, the Crow and Shoshone, which drained off many of their resources.

To combat the Sioux, the U.S. army established a string of forts ringing the Great Sioux Reservation and unceded territory. The largest force arrayed against the Indians at one time was in summer 1876 and consisted of 2,500 soldiers deployed in the unceded territory and accompanied by hundreds of Indian scouts and civilians. Many of the soldiers were recent immigrants and inexperienced on the frontier and in Indian warfare. Cavalry soldiers were armed with .45 caliber, single-action revolvers and the Springfield model 1873, a single-shot, breech-loading rifle which gave the soldiers a large advantage in range over most Indian firearms.

== Launching the war ==
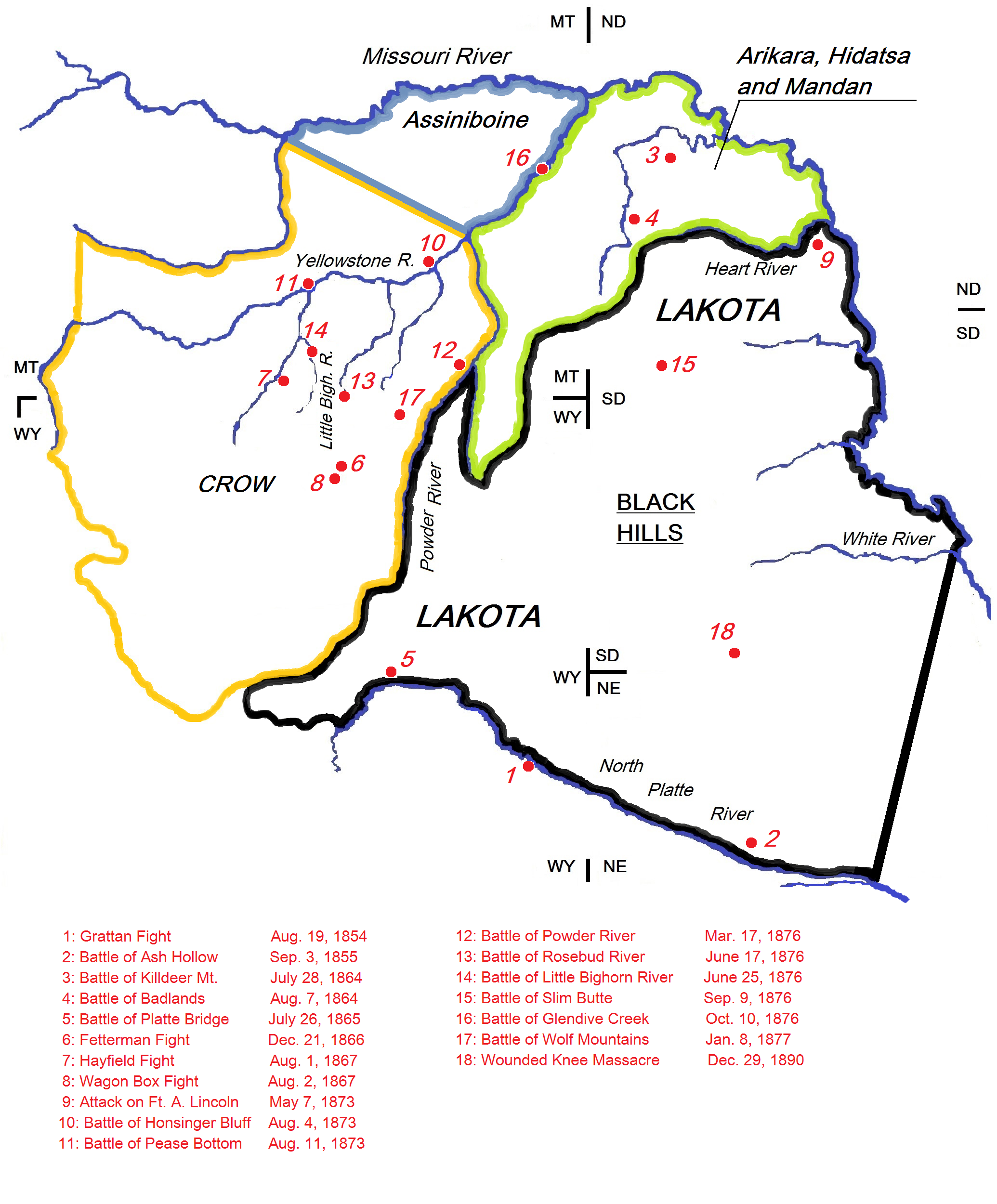
The Lakota Wars (1854–1890): The battlefields and the Lakota treaty territory of 1851. Most battles "between the army and the Dakota [Lakota] were on lands those Indians had taken from other tribes since 1851".

Grant and his administration began to consider alternatives to the failed diplomatic venture. In early November 1875, Lieutenant General Philip Sheridan, commander of the Division of the Missouri, and Brigadier General George Crook, commander of the Department of the Platte, were called to Washington, D.C. to meet with Grant and several members of his cabinet to discuss the Black Hills issue. They agreed that the Army should stop evicting trespassers from the reservation, thus opening the way for the Black Hills Gold Rush. In addition, they discussed initiating military action against the bands of Lakota and Northern Cheyenne who had refused to come to the Indian agencies for council. Indian Inspector Erwin C. Watkins supported this option. "The true policy in my judgement," he wrote, "is to send troops against them in the winter, the sooner the better, and whip them into subjection."

Concerned about launching a war against the Lakota without provocation, the government instructed Indian agents in the region to notify all Lakota and Sioux to return to the reservation by January 31, 1876, or face potential military action. The US agent at Standing Rock Agency expressed concern that this was insufficient time for the Lakota to respond, as deep winter restricted travel. His request to extend the deadline was denied. General Sheridan considered the notification exercise a waste of time. "The matter of notifying the Indians to come in is perhaps well to put on paper," he commented, "but it will in all probability be regarded as a good joke by the Indians."

Meanwhile, in the council lodges of the non-treaty bands, Lakota leaders seriously discussed the notification for return. Short Bull, a member of the Soreback Band of the Oglala, later recalled that many of the bands had gathered on the Tongue River. "About one hundred men went out from the agency to coax the hostiles to come in under pretense that the trouble about the Black Hills was to be settled," he said. "...All the hostiles agreed that since it was late [in the season] and they had to shoot for tipis [i.e., hunt buffalo] they would come in to the agency the following spring."

As the deadline of January 31 passed, the new Commissioner of Indian Affairs, John Q. Smith, wrote that "without the receipt of any news of Sitting Bull's submission, I see no reason why, in the discretion of the Hon. the Secretary of War, military operations against him should not commence at once." His superior, Secretary of the Interior Zachariah Chandler agreed, adding that "the said Indians are hereby turned over to the War Department for such action on the part of the Army as you may deem proper under the circumstances." On February 8, 1876, General Sheridan telegraphed Generals Crook and Terry, ordering them to commence their winter campaigns against the "hostiles", thus starting The Great Sioux War of 1876–77.

== Reynolds' campaign ==
While General Terry stalled, General Crook immediately launched the first strike. He dispatched Colonel Joseph J. Reynolds with six companies of cavalry, who located a village of about 65 lodges and attacked on the morning of March 17, 1876. Crook accompanied the column but did not play any command role. His troops initially took control of and burned the village, but they quickly retreated under enemy fire. The US troops left several soldiers on the battlefield, an action which led to Colonel Reynolds' court-martial. The US captured the band's pony herd, but the following day, the Lakota recovered many of their horses in a raid. At the time, the Army believed they had attacked Crazy Horse; however, it had actually been a village of Northern Cheyenne (led by Old Bear, Two Moons and White Bull) with a few Oglala (led by He Dog.)

== Summer expeditions ==
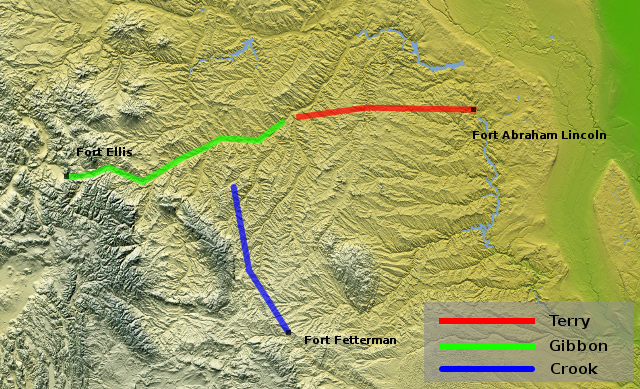
The three columns of the 1876 summer campaign

In the late spring of 1876 a second, much larger campaign was launched. From Fort Abraham Lincoln marched the Dakota Column, commanded by General Alfred Terry, with 15 companies or about 570 men, including Custer and all 12 companies of the Seventh Cavalry. The Montana Column, commanded by Colonel John Gibbon, departed Fort Ellis. General Crook commanded a third column that departed Fort Fetterman to head north. The plan was for all three columns to converge simultaneously on the Lakota hunting grounds and pin down the Indians between the approaching troops.

=== Battle of the Rosebud ===
General Crook's column was the first to make contact with the northern bands in the Battle of the Rosebud on June 17. While Crook claimed a victory, most historians note that the Indians had effectively checked his advance. Thus the Battle of the Rosebud was at the very least a tactical draw if not a victory for the Indians. Afterward General Crook remained in camp for several weeks awaiting reinforcements, essentially taking his column out of the fighting for a significant period of time.

=== Battle of the Little Bighorn ===
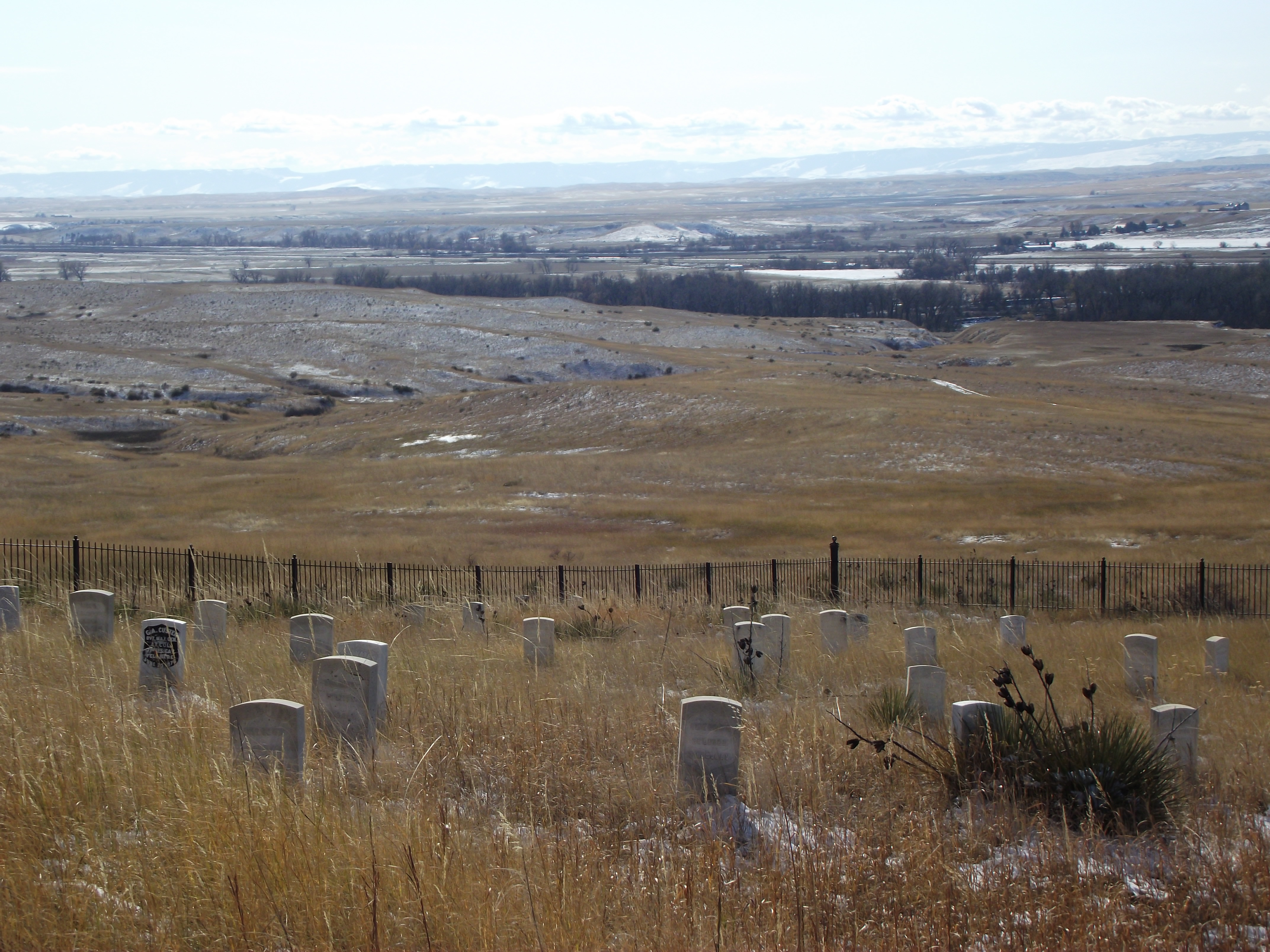
Custer and the last of his men were killed and buried here. The Indian village was on the other side of the line of trees marking the Little Bighorn River. To visit the old battlefield today it is necessary to enter the Crow Indian Reservation – it was exactly the same in 1876.

Lt. Col. George Armstrong Custer and the Seventh Cavalry were ordered out from the main Dakota Column to scout the Rosebud and Big Horn river valleys. On June 25, 1876, they encountered a large village on the west bank of the Little Bighorn. The US troops were seriously beaten in the Battle of the Little Bighorn and nearly 270 men were killed, including Custer. Custer split his forces just prior to the battle and his immediate command of five cavalry companies was annihilated without any survivors. Two days later, a combined force consisting of Colonel Gibbon's column, along with Terry's headquarters staff and the Dakota Column infantry, reached the area and rescued the US survivors of the Reno-Benteen fight. Gibbon then headed his forces to the east, chasing trails but unable to engage the Sioux and Cheyenne warriors in battle.

=== Battle of Slim Buttes ===
Reinforced with the Fifth Cavalry, General Crook took to the field. Hooking up briefly with General Terry, he soon moved out on his own but did not find a large village. Running short on supplies, his column turned south and made what became called the Horsemeat March toward mining settlements to find food. On September 9, 1876, an advance company from his column under Captain Anson Mills and First Lieutenant John Wilson Bubb was en route to Deadwood to procure supplies when it stumbled across a small village at Slim Buttes, which they attacked. Crazy Horse learned of the assault on the village and the next day led a counter-attack, which was repulsed. After reaching Camp Robinson, Crook's forces disbanded.

== Crackdown at the agencies ==
In the wake of Custer's defeat at the Little Bighorn, the Army altered its tactics. They increased troop levels at the Indian agencies. That fall, they attached most of the troops to the Army for operations. They seized horses and weapons belonging to friendly bands at the agencies, for fear they would be given to the resisting northern bands. In October 1876, Army troops surrounded the villages of Red Cloud and Red Leaf. They arrested and briefly confined the leaders, holding them responsible for failing to turn in individuals arriving in camp from hostile bands. The US sent another commission to the agencies. According to historian Colin Calloway, "Congress passed a law extinguishing all Lakota rights outside the Great Sioux Reservation."

== Mackenzie's campaign ==
Colonel Ranald S. Mackenzie and his Fourth Cavalry were transferred to the Department of the Platte following the defeat at the Little Bighorn. Stationed initially at Camp Robinson, they formed the core of the Powder River Expedition that departed in October 1876 to locate the northern villages. On November 25, 1876, his column discovered and defeated a village of Northern Cheyenne in the Dull Knife Fight in Wyoming Territory. With their lodges and supplies destroyed and their horses confiscated, the Northern Cheyenne soon surrendered. They hoped to be allowed to remain with the Sioux in the north. They were pressured to relocate to the reservation of the Southern Cheyenne in Indian Territory. After a difficult council, they agreed to go.

When they arrived at the reservation in present-day Oklahoma, conditions were very difficult: inadequate rations, no buffalo left alive near the reservation, and malaria. A portion of the Northern Cheyenne, led by Little Wolf and Dull Knife, attempted to return to the north in the fall of 1877 in the Northern Cheyenne Exodus. They succeeded in reaching the north. After they divided into two bands, that led by Dull Knife was captured and imprisoned in an unheated barracks at Fort Robinson without food or water. When the Cheyenne escaped on January 9, 1878, many died at US Army hands in the subsequent Fort Robinson massacre. Eventually the US government granted the Northern Cheyenne a northern reservation, the Northern Cheyenne Reservation in present-day southern Montana.

== Miles' campaigns ==
Another strategy of the US Army was to place troops deep within the heartland of Lakota Territory. In the fall of 1876, Colonel Nelson A. Miles and his Fifth Infantry established Cantonment on Tongue River (later renamed Fort Keogh) from which he operated throughout the winter of 1876–77 against any hostiles he could find. In January 1877, he fought Crazy Horse and many other bands at the Battle of Wolf Mountain. In the months that followed, his troops fought the Lakota at Clear Creek, Spring Creek and Ash Creek. Miles' continuous campaigning pushed a number of the Northern Cheyenne and Lakota to either surrender or slip across the border into Canada. Miles later commanded the US Army during the Spanish–American War.

== Annexation ==
The Agreement of 1877 (19 Stat. 254, enacted February 28, 1877) officially took away Sioux land and permanently established Indian reservations.

== Diplomatic efforts ==
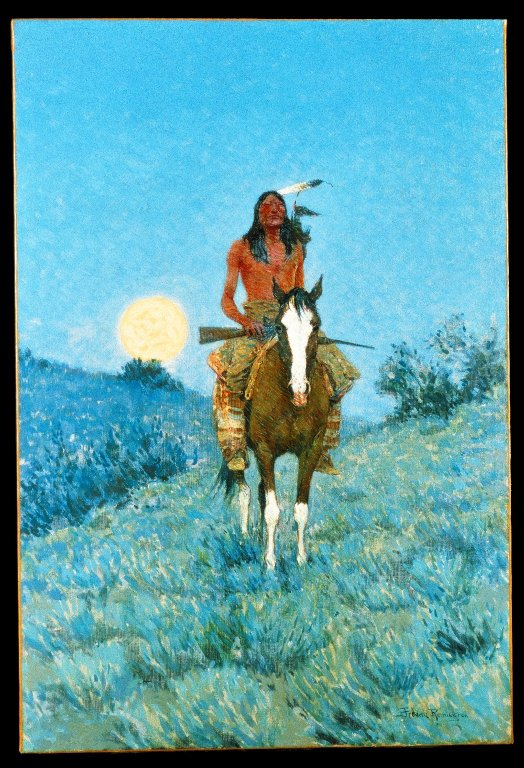
An Indian warrior, painting by Frederic Remington

While military leaders began planning a spring campaign against the Lakota and Northern Cheyenne who had refused to come in, a number of diplomatic efforts were underway in an effort to end the war.

=== "Sell or Starve" ===
After the defeat at the Battle of the Little Bighorn in June 1876, Congress responded by attaching what the Sioux call the "sell or starve" rider (19 Stat. 192) to the Indian Appropriations Act of 1876 (enacted August 15, 1876) which cut off all rations for the Sioux until they terminated hostilities and ceded the Black Hills to the United States.

=== George Sword mission ===
As the winter wore on, rumors reached Camp Robinson that the northern bands were interested in surrendering. The commanding officer sent out a peace delegation. About 30 young men, mostly Oglala and Northern Cheyenne, departed from the Red Cloud Agency on January 16, 1877, to make the dangerous journey north. Among the most prominent members of this delegation was a young Oglala named Enemy Bait (better known later as George Sword). He was the son of the prominent headman Brave Bear. The delegation found Crazy Horse on the Powder River, but found no indication that he was prepared to surrender. Other Oglala camps nearby, however, were more willing to hear the message and seriously consider surrendering at the agencies. In late February, part of the delegation continued on to find the Northern Cheyenne, where they delivered the same message.

=== Spotted Tail mission ===
The influential Brulé headman Spotted Tail also agreed to lead a peace delegation out to meet with the "hostiles". Departing his agency on February 12, 1877, with perhaps 200 people, Spotted Tail moved north along the eastern edge of the Black Hills. They soon found a large village of Miniconjou under Touch the Clouds, near Short Pine Hills on the Little Missouri River. After several days of councils, they agreed to go in and surrender at the Spotted Tail Agency.

Spotted Tail's delegation continued on to the Little Powder River, where they met with Miniconjou, Sans Arc, Oglala and a few Northern Cheyenne, including leaders such as Black Shield, Fast Bull, Lame Deer, and Roman Nose. Most of these bands also agreed to go in to the Spotted Tail Agency to surrender. Crazy Horse was not in the camp, but his father gave a horse to a member of the delegation, as evidence that the Oglala war leader was ready to surrender.

=== Johnny Brughier mission ===
Not to be outdone by General Crook's diplomatic efforts, Colonel Miles sent out a peace initiative from his Tongue River Cantonment. Scout Johnny Brughier, aided by two captive Cheyenne women, found the Northern Cheyenne village on the Little Bighorn. They met in councils for several days. His effort would lead to a large contingent of Northern Cheyenne eventually surrendering at the Tongue River Cantonment.

=== Red Cloud mission ===
On April 13, a second delegation departed the Red Cloud Agency, led by the noted Oglala leader Red Cloud, with nearly 70 other members of various bands. This delegation met Crazy Horse's people en route to the agency to surrender and accompanied them most of the way in.

== Surrenders ==
The continuous military campaigns and the intensive diplomatic efforts finally began to yield results in the early spring of 1877 as large numbers of northern bands began to surrender. A large number of Northern Cheyenne, led by Dull Knife and Standing Elk, surrendered at the Red Cloud Agency on April 21, 1877. They were shipped to Indian Territory the following month. Touch the Clouds and Roman Nose arrived with bands at the Spotted Tail Agency. Crazy Horse surrendered with his band at Red Cloud on May 5.

=== Death of Crazy Horse ===
The respected Oglala leader Crazy Horse spent several months with his band at the Red Cloud Agency amidst an environment of intense politics. Fearing he was about to break away, the Army moved to surround his village and arrest the leader on September 4, 1877. Crazy Horse slipped away to the Spotted Tail Agency. The following day, Crazy Horse was brought back to Camp Robinson with the promise that he could meet with the post commander. Instead, he was taken to the guard house under arrest. During his struggle to escape, he was fatally bayoneted by a soldier.

== Flight to Canada ==
While many of the Lakota surrendered at the various agencies along the Missouri River or in northwestern Nebraska, Sitting Bull led a large contingent across the international border into Canada. General Terry was part of a delegation sent to negotiate with the bands, hoping to persuade them to surrender and return to the US, but they initially refused. Sitting Bull later agreed to surrender at the behest of his friend Jean-Louis Legare. In 1880–81, most of the Lakota from Canada surrendered at Fort Keogh and Fort Buford. US forces transferred them by steamboat to the Standing Rock Agency 1881.

== Aftermath ==
The Great Sioux War of 1876–77 contrasted sharply with Red Cloud's War fought a decade earlier. During the 1860s, Lakota leaders enjoyed wide support from their bands for the fighting. By contrast, in 1876–77, nearly two-thirds of all Lakota had settled at Indian agencies to accept rations and gain subsistence. Such bands did not support or participate in the fighting.

The deep political divisions within the Lakota continued well into the early reservation period, affecting native politics for several decades. In 1889–90, the rise of the Ghost Dance movement found a large majority of its followers among the non-agency bands who had fought in the Great Sioux War.

While much more numerous in total population, the bands of the Lakota generally were independent and made separate decisions about warfare. Many bands did ally with the Cheyenne, and there was intermarriage between the tribes. An alternative view is that the Plains Indians considered the war of 1876–77 to be "The Great Cheyenne War".
