= One Bull =

Lakota Sioux man (1853–1947)

- Tȟatȟáŋka Waŋžíla
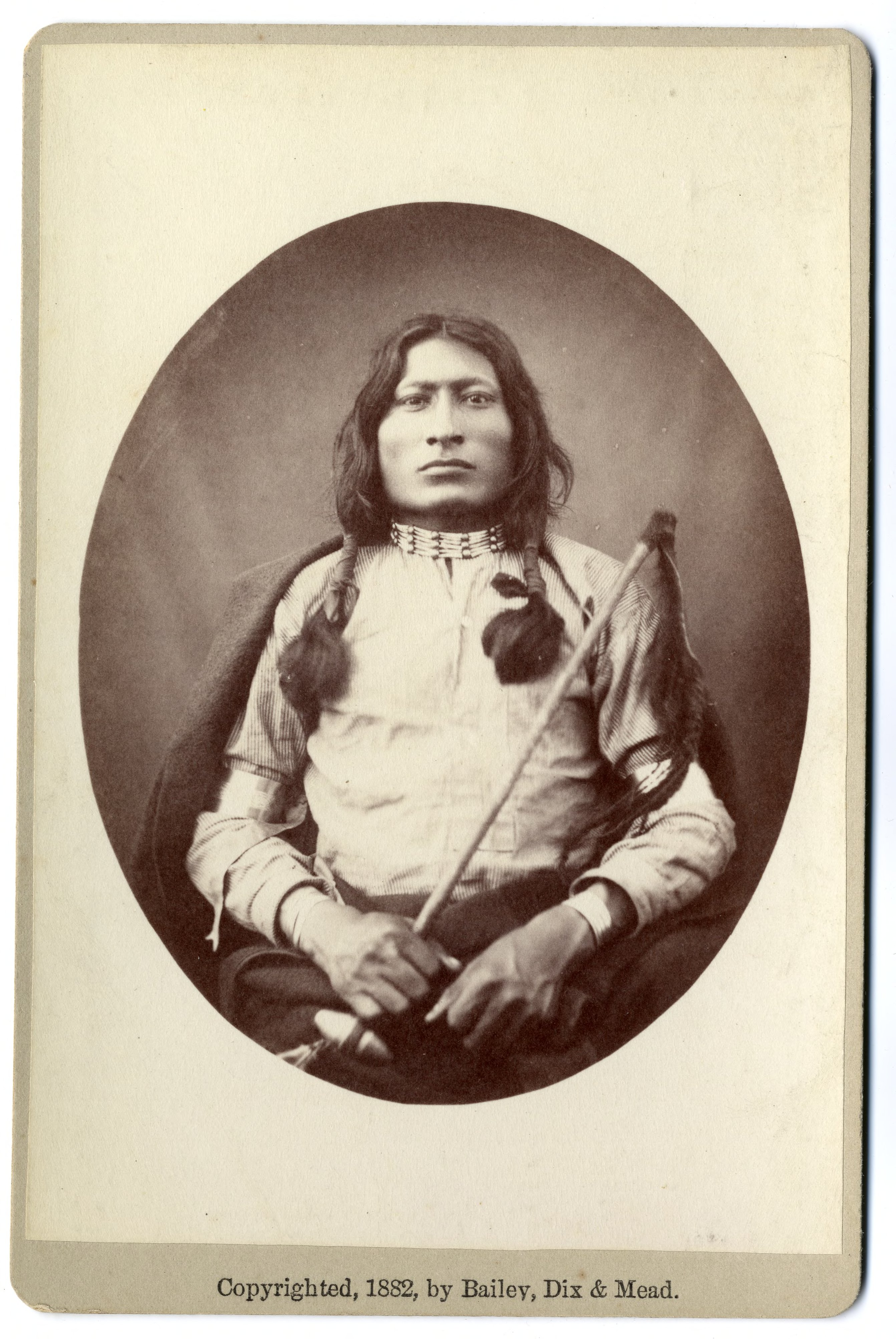
- One Bull in 1882
- Born: c. 1853
- Died: June 23, 1947 (aged 93–94)
- Resting place: Rosebud Cemetery, Mission, Todd, South Dakota
- Other names: Lone Bull, Henry Oscar One Bull
- Citizenship: Lakota
- Spouse: Lucy Olive Cross Bear (1884)
- Children: 5

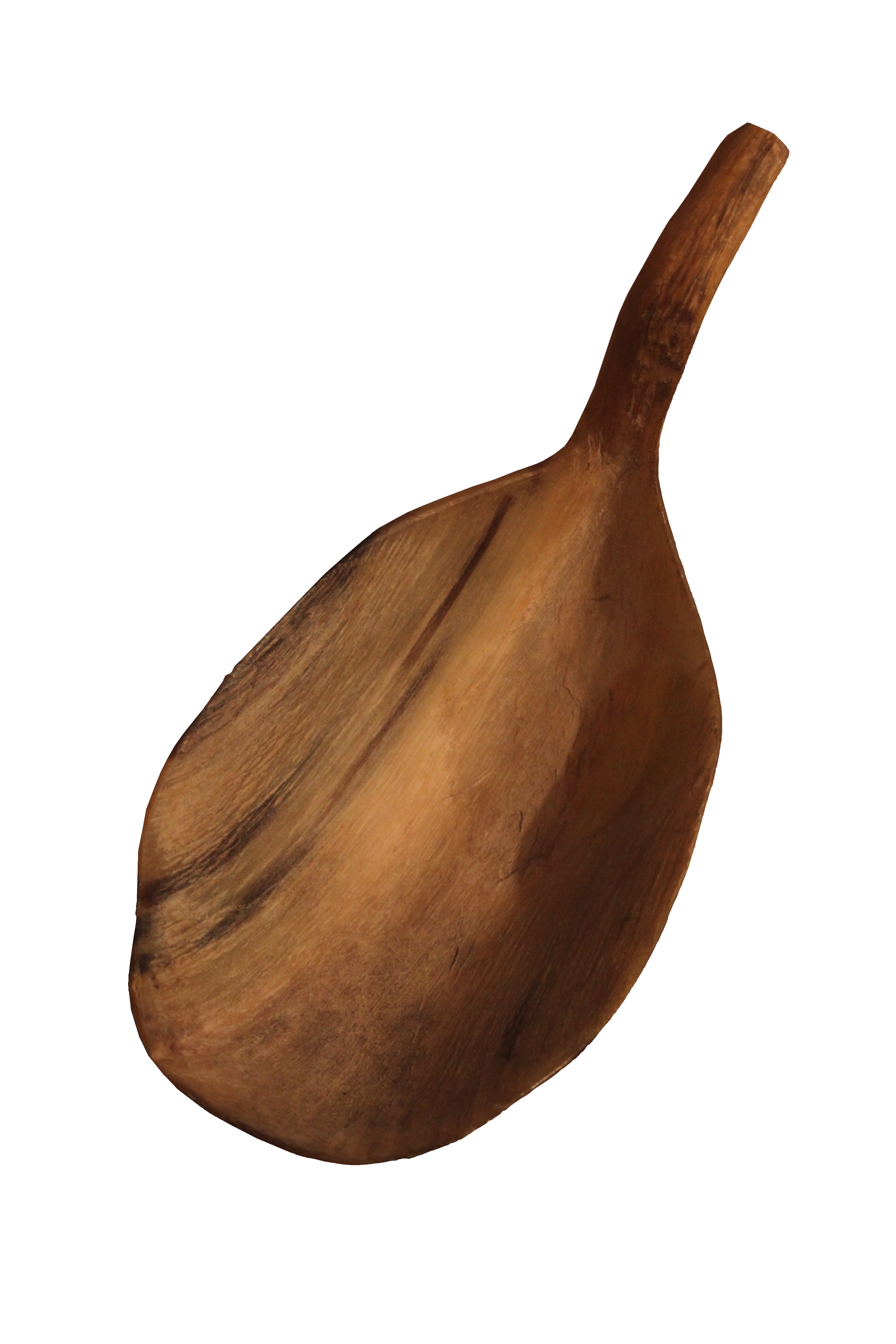
Spoon which belonged to One Bull, at the Spurlock Museum

One Bull, sometimes given as Lone Bull (Lakota: Tȟatȟáŋka Waŋžíla; c. 1853–1947), later known as Henry Oscar One Bull, was a Lakota Sioux man best known for being the nephew and adopted son of Sitting Bull. He fought at Battle of the Little Bighorn and, in his later years, provided interviews about his life as a warrior.

== Early life ==
His mother was Sitting Bull's sister Good Feather; his father was Makes Room and his brother was White Bull.

One Bull was adopted by Sitting Bull in 1857 at the age of four. One Bull recalled that Sitting Bull gave him a pinto pony when he was about six years old; One Bull named the pony Itanchan, or Chief. He treated the horse well, never whipping or otherwise abusing the pony, which became the "swiftest runner in the camp, the envy of all and the object of many rejected offers of purchase".

== Life as a warrior ==
One Bull was a Heyoka, one who had dreamed of thunderbirds.

One Bull participated in Battle of the Little Bighorn in 1876. He arrived with his horse and Sitting Bull's. He rode his mother to safety and then joined the fight. Sitting Bull told him, "Fear nothing. Go straight in". One Bull recounted having killed several fleeing troopers in the battle. He wore his uncle's shield during the Battle of Little Bighorn. One Bull joined his uncle in fleeing to Canada following the Battle of the Little Bighorn in 1876.

In subsequent years, he was highly regarded amongst the Plains Indians for his rescuing of a warrior named Good Bear Boy.

Sitting Bull's band remained in the "Grandmother's Country" until he surrendered in North Dakota in 1881. One Bull stood by Sitting Bull at his surrender. He later contradicted the narrative that Sitting Bull had said at his surrender: "Let it be recorded that I was the last man of my people to lay down my gun." One Bull reported that Sitting Bull was silent.

One Bull, who had been away hauling freight north of Fort Yates, had returned the night before the massacre of Sitting Bull. His wife, Red Whirlwind, who was pregnant, had been sleeping in Sitting Bull's cabin. When One Bull heard the shots, he rushed to the cabin and got his wife to safety, who had escaped the gunfire, only returning to Sitting Bull's home after the troops had gone.

== Later life ==
Following the death of Sitting Bull, One Bull reported that all of his personal household goods and some of his horses were taken.

One Bull is listed as living in 1929 at the Standing Rock Agency, where he was prominent in tribal matters.

One Bull participated in interviews about his experiences with Sitting Bull, as did his brother White Bull, a famous Lakota warrior and chief contributor to Stanley Vestal's biography of their uncle.

== Depiction in media ==
One Bull was portrayed by Nathan Lee Chasing His Horse in the television miniseries Bury My Heart at Wounded Knee (2007).
