= Archie Fire Lame Deer =

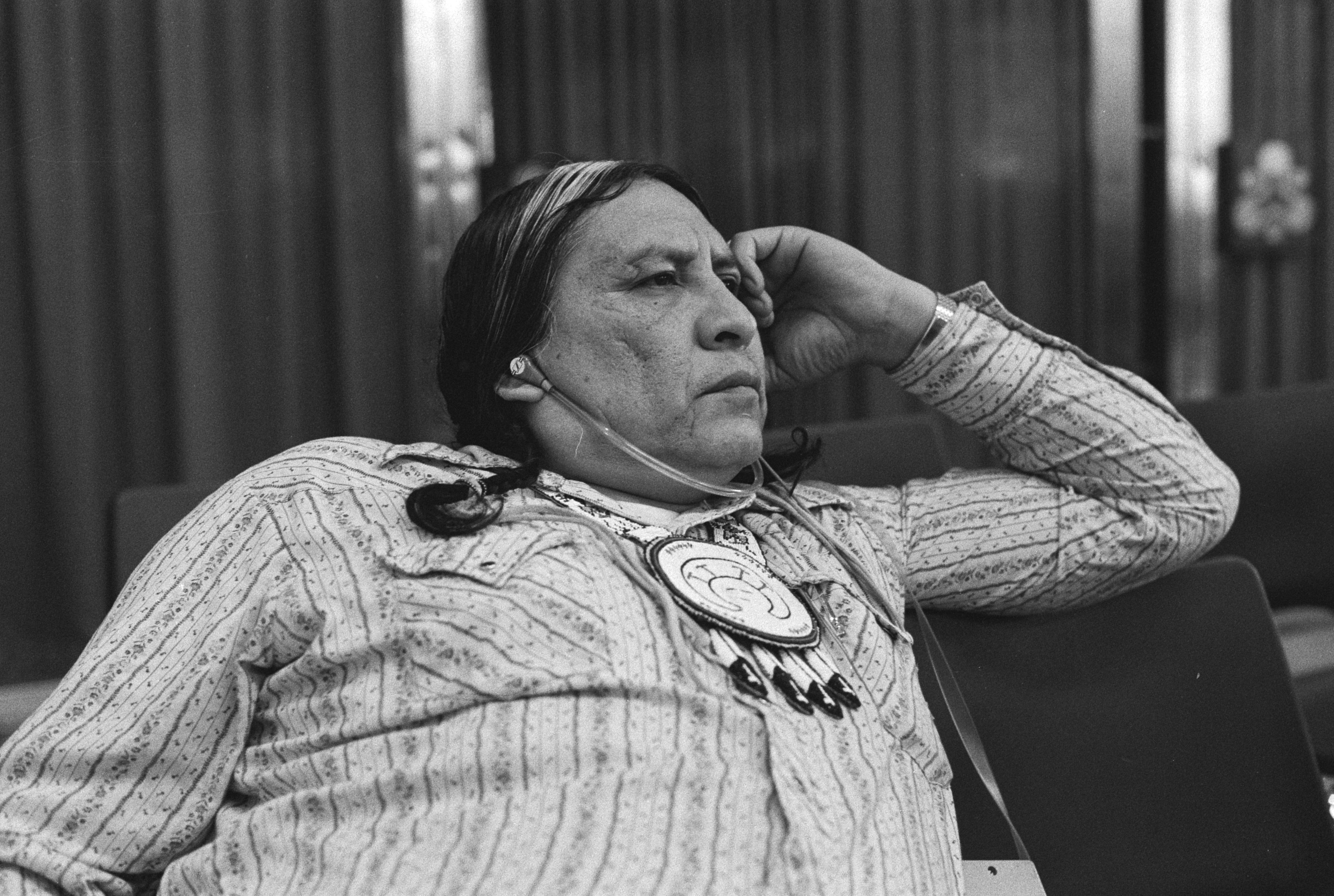
- Archie Fire Lame Deer at the 4th Russell Tribunal in Amsterdam (November 24, 1980)
- Born: Archie Percy Let Them Have Enough; 1935; Corn Creek, Rosebud Indian Reservation, South Dakota, U.S.
- Died: 2001 (aged 65–66)
- Father: John Fire Lame Deer

Archie Fire Lame Deer or Tȟáȟča Hušté (1935–2001) was a Lakota spiritual leader, a U.S. Army veteran, and a lecturer on Lakota traditions and religion. He grew up on the Rosebud Indian Reservation, served in the US Army during the Korean war, and was a Hollywood stuntman and translator. With Richard Erdoes he wrote Gift of Power: the life and teachings of a Lakota medicine man. He is the son of Lakota medicine man John Fire Lame Deer and the subject of the classic book, "Lame Deer Seeker of Visions” with Richard Erdoes.

== Biography ==
He was born Archie Percy Let Them Have Enough in Corn Creek, South Dakota, on the Rosebud Indian Reservation. His father was John Fire Lame Deer (a.k.a. John Let Them Have Enough), a well known Lakota holy man by his third wife, Josephine Quick Bear. Archie grew up with the guidance and teachings of his grandfather, Henry Quick Bear. He attended school the St. Francis Indian School, but was able to run away at age 14 after many tries. He enlisted in the army twice and was a veteran of the Korean War, a member of the Special Forces, and a prisoner of war.

Among other temporary careers, Archie was a ranch hand on numerous South Dakota ranches, a rattlesnake exterminator, a Hollywood stuntman, a rodeo rider and a foreman on a Hollywood ranch. Upon giving up alcohol addiction in 1971, he also became a drug and alcohol counsellor. Through the Los Angeles Indian Center, he ran a program for Native American offenders imprisoned in both State and Federal institutions in California. Archie was instrumental in bringing Lakota purification ceremonies into prisons across the United States and also helped found and run the Santa Barbara Indian Center.

During the last 20 years of his life, Archie Fire Lame Deer travelled throughout the world teaching Lakota spiritual beliefs and way of life. In his travels he met and talked with numerous spiritual leaders including the Dalai Lama and the Pope. In 1980 he also spoke in Rotterdam at the Fourth Russell Tribunal on Indigenous Peoples' Rights.

For many years Chief Lame Deer was the intercessor at the annual Crow Dog's Sundance on the Rosebud Indian Reservation, just like his father before him. When Archie died, his son John took his place as a Chief and medicine man and carries on the traditions of the Lame Deer family.

Archie Fire Lame Deer was the subject of the book Gift of Power: The Life and Teachings of a Lakota Medicine Man, which he co-wrote with Richard Erdoes in 1992.

== Controversy ==
On July 12, 1980, Lame Deer was in the process of conducting a vision quest ceremony for two men, one of whom, Ronald Delgado, was a diabetic. Delgado died during the four-day ceremony. Lame Deer was promptly denounced as a "known fraud" and a "twinkie" (New Age practitioner) by a few Native American activists and by some white New Age groups. No charges were filed against Lame Deer.

Prior to the incident, Lame Deer had been interviewed by Peter Matthiesen in 1978 and again in 1979. Mathiesen gratefully acknowledged that Lame Deer had "been kind enough" to include him in a sweat lodge purification ceremony at that time, and described ceremonies of respect performed by Lame Deer at Point Conception and other places around Santa Barbara, California. He quoted Lame Deer as being extremely concerned about improperly performed sweat lodges and Sun Dance ceremonies, often conducted by younger Indians with no sense of the proper timing or "feelings" of the year, wind, or weather.
