= Stanley Vestal =

American historian and poet

- Born: Walter Stanley Vestal; August 15, 1887; Severy, Kansas, U.S.
- Died: December 25, 1957 (aged 70); Oklahoma City, Oklahoma, U.S.
- Resting place: Custer National Cemetery; Big Horn County, Montana
- Education: Southwestern Oklahoma State University; Merton College, Oxford
- Occupations: Author: Books of the Old West, including Dodge City, Queen of the Cowtowns; Professor of English at University of Oklahoma
- Spouse: Isabel Jones Campbell
- Children: Two daughters

Stanley Vestal (born Walter Stanley Vestal; August 15, 1887 – December 25, 1957) was an American writer, poet, biographer, and historian, perhaps best known for his books on the American Old West, including Sitting Bull, Champion of the Sioux.

== Biography ==
Vestal was born to Walter Mallory Vestal and the former Isabella "Daisy" Wood near Severy in Greenwood County in southeastern Kansas. Vestal's father died when he was young. His mother remarried, and Vestal took the legal surname Campbell from his stepfather, James Robert Campbell. About 1889, the Campbell family relocated to Guthrie in the newly established Oklahoma Territory, where he learned Native American customs from his boyhood playmates, knowledge which would later be useful in his writing career.

In 1903, Vestal graduated from the new institution, Southwestern Oklahoma State University in Weatherford. His stepfather was the first president of the college. Vestal was Oklahoma's first Rhodes Scholar. He earned a Bachelor of Arts and a Master of Arts in English from Oxford University in England.

Vestal taught for three years at Male High School in Louisville, Kentucky, before he became a professor of English at the University of Oklahoma at Norman, where he became known for his courses in creative writing. He temporarily left the university on three occasions, as a captain in an artillery regiment during World War I, as a Guggenheim Fellow from 1930 to 1931, and under a Rockefeller Fellowship in 1946.

Between 1927 and his death on Christmas Day 1957 from a heart attack in Oklahoma City, Vestal wrote more than twenty books, some novels, poems, and as many as one hundred articles about the Old West. He is interred as Walter S. Campbell at the Custer National Cemetery in Big Horn County, Montana.

== Partial bibliography ==
- Fandango: Ballads of the Old West, Houghton Mifflin Company, Boston, 1927
- Mountain Men', Houghton Mifflin Company, Boston, 1927
- "Happy Hunting Grounds"' Lyons and Carnahan, Chicago, IL, 1928
- Kit Carson, the Happy Warrior of the West, Houghton Mifflin Company, Boston, 1928
- Dobe Walls a Story of Kit Carson's Southwest, Houghton Mifflin Company, Boston, 1929
- Sitting Bull-Champion of the Sioux-a Biography, Houghton Mifflin Company, Boston, 1932
- New Sources of Indian History 1850–1891. The Ghost Dance. The Prairie Sioux . A Miscellany'. University of Oklahoma Press, Norman, 1934
- The Wine Room Murder, Little, Brown & Co., Boston, 1935
- Revolt On The Border, Houghton Mifflin Company, Boston, 1938
- The Old Santa Fe Trail, Houghton Mifflin Company, Boston, 1939
- King of the Fur Traders: The Deeds and Deviltry of Pierre Esprit Radisson, Houghton Mifflin Company, Boston, 1940
- Big Foot Wallace, A Biography', Houghton Mifflin Company, Boston, 1942
- Jim Bridger Mountain Man, William Morrow, New York, 1946
- Joe Meek, The Merry Mountain Man, Caxton, Caldwell, Idaho, 1952
- Short Grass Country', Duell, Sloan and Pearce, New York City, 1941
- The Missouri, Farrar & Rinehart, New York, 1945 (Volume 26 of the Rivers of America Series)
- "Wagons Southwest: Story of Old Trail to Santa Fe," American Pioneer trails Association, New York, 1946
- Warpath and Council Fire: The Plains Indians' Struggle for Survival in War and in Diplomacy, 1851–1891, Random House, New York, 1948
- Dodge City, Queen of Cowtowns: "The wickedest little city in America", 1872–1886, Harper Brothers, New York, 1952
- The Book Lover's Southwest: A guide to good reading, University of Oklahoma Press, Norman, 1955
- The Indian Tipi: Its History, Construction, and Use, (with Reginald Laubin & Gladys Laubin), University of Oklahoma Press, Norman, 1957
- Warpath: The True Story of the Fighting Sioux Told in a Biography of Chief White Bull, University of Nebraska Press, Lincoln, 1984 (copyrighted 1934 as Walter Stanley Campbell)
