= Lone Horn =

One Horn Hewáŋžiča
- Chief
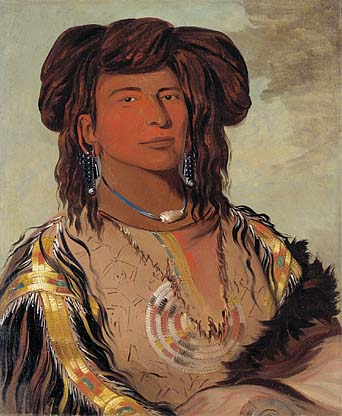
- Painting by George Catlin of the Honorable Chief Ha-wón-je-tah, 1832
- Successor: Chief Spotted Elk
- Born: x. 1790
- Died: 1877 (aged 86–87); Bear Butte
- Spouse: Sand Bar
- Issue: Spotted Elk
- Father: Black Buffalo
- Mother: White Cow Woman

Lone Horn (Lakota: Hewáŋžiča, or in historical spelling "Heh-won-ge-chat" or "Ha-wón-je-tah"), also called One Horn (c. 1790 –1877), born in present-day South Dakota, was chief of the Wakpokinyan (Flies Along the Stream) band of the Minneconjou Lakota.

Lone Horn's sons were Spotted Elk (later known as Big Foot) and Touch the Clouds; Rattling Blanket Woman was his sister, and Crazy Horse was his nephew. He participated in the signing of the Treaty of Fort Laramie in 1868, which reads "Heh-won-ge-chat, his x mark, One Horn". Old Chief Smoke (1774–1864) was Lone Horn's maternal uncle.

Lone Horn died near Bear Butte in 1877 from old age. After Lone Horn's death his adopted son Spotted Elk eventually became chief of the Minneconjou and was later killed along with his people at the Wounded Knee Massacre in 1890.

== George Catlin paints One Horn ==
In 1832, George Catlin painted One Horn, at Fort Pierre, South Dakota. Back East, Caitlin wrote this description of him:

"[One Horn was] a middle-aged man, of middling stature, with a noble countenance, and a figure almost equaling the Apollo, and I painted his portrait. ... [He] has risen rapidly to the highest honours in the tribe, from his own extraordinary merits, even at so early an age. He told me he took the name of 'One Horn' (or shell) from a simple small shell that was hanging on his neck, which descended to him from his father, and which, he said, he valued more than anything he possessed; affording a striking instance of the living affection which these people often cherish for the dead. ... His costume was a very handsome one, and will have a place in my Indian Gallery by the side of his picture. It is made of elk skins beautifully dressed, and fringed with a profusion of porcupine quills and scalp-locks; and his hair, which is very long and profuse, divided into two parts, and lifted up and crossed, over the top of his head, with a simple tie, giving it somewhat the appearance of a Turkish turban.

"This extraordinary man, before he was raised to the dignity of chief, was the renowned of his tribe for his athletic achievements. In the chase he was foremost; he could run down a buffalo, which he often had done, on his own legs, and drive his arrow to the heart. He was the fleetest in the tribe; and in the races he had run, he had always taken the prize."

== Other Lone Horns ==
A Lakota chief, thought to be Oglala, named Lone Horn or One Horn is recorded in Lakota winter counts. In 1834, he accidentally caused the death of his only son. Consumed by sorrow, he committed suicide by attacking a buffalo bull on foot with only a knife, and was mangled to death. Drury and Clavin's text The Heart of Everything That Is: the Untold Story of Red Cloud states that One Horn's suicide was caused by his grief over the death of his favorite wife: "But when illness took his favorite young wife, so heavy was his grief that in a kind of ritual suicide he attacked a bull buffalo, alone, on foot, with only a knife. The two-horned animal gored The One Horn to death."

Lone Horn (c. 1814-1875), son of Red Fish (Oglala), served as head chief of the Miniconjou.

== See also ==
- Spotted Elk or Big Foot
- Touch the Clouds
