= Spotted Elk =

Native American leader (1826 - 1890)

- Uŋpȟáŋ Glešká
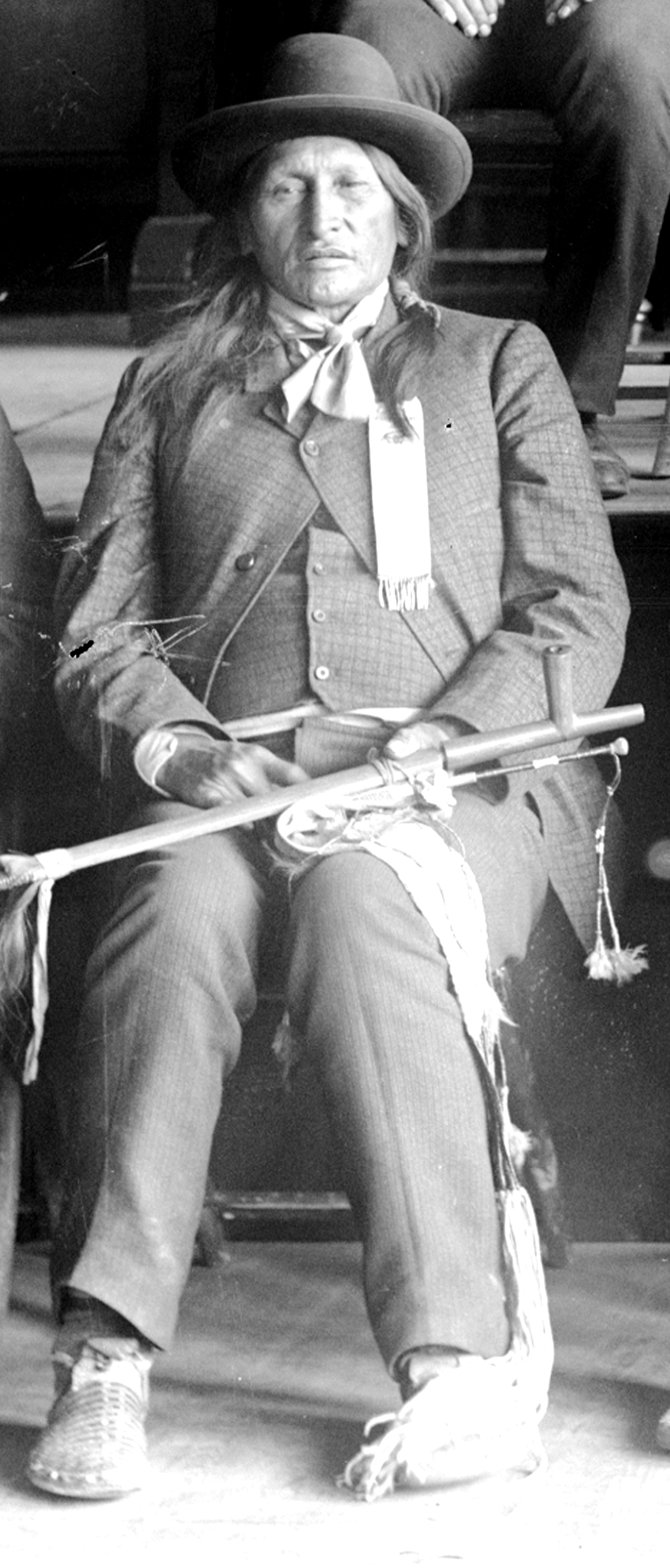
- Spotted Elk in 1888

Miniconjou-Lakota-Sioux Chief
- Preceded by: Lone Horn (Hewáŋžiča)

Personal details
- Born: c. 1826
- Died: December 29, 1890 (aged 63–64) Wounded Knee Creek, Pine Ridge Indian Reservation (Lakota:Chankwe Opi Wakpala, Wazí Aháŋhaŋ Oyáŋke), South Dakota, U.S.
- Cause of death: Killed at the Wounded Knee Massacre
- Resting place: Wounded Knee Monument, Wounded Knee Creek
- Parent: Lone Horn (father)
- Nickname: Big Foot (Sí Tȟáŋka)

Spotted Elk (Lakota Uŋpȟáŋ Glešká; c. 1826 – December 29, 1890) was a Chief of the Miniconjou-Lakota-Sioux. He was a son of Lone Horn and became a Chief upon his father's death. He was a highly renowned Chief with skills in war and negotiations. Spotted Elk was also referred to as "Big Foot” Sí Tȟáŋk), a derisive name he obtained from an American soldier at Fort Bennett (from Lakota:Sí for “foot,Tȟáŋka for “big”). (Note: Spotted Elk ( “Big Foot”) should not be confused with Oglala Big Foot (also known as Ste Si Tȟáŋka and Chetan keah), who actually bore this name. See: https://www.american-tribes.com/Lakota/BIO/BigFoot-Oglala.htm) In 1890, Spotted Elk was killed by the U.S. Army at Wounded Knee Creek, Pine Ridge Indian Reservation (Chankwe Opi Wakpala, Wazí Aháŋhaŋ Oyáŋke), South Dakota with at least 150 members of his tribe, during the infamous Wounded Knee Massacre.

== Name ==
The word elk in Spotted Elk's name is uŋpȟáŋ in Lakota language and means elk-cow. There are two gendered terms for elk in Lakota language - heȟáka - male/buck, with antlers, and uŋpȟáŋ, (Note: See the following genealogical list: Standing Rock Agency Rations Issue) female, referred to as 'cow' in English. Newborn elk, like deer are spotted as natural camouflage, but spotted (glešká) adult female elk are exceptionally rare in nature. Anthropologist and ethnohistorian Raymond J. DeMallie's census data list Uŋpȟáŋwiŋ as the term for "(Female) Elk," used as a name element alongside Heȟáka, "(Male) Elk." Animal names of this kind form the largest single semantic category in his sample, accounting for 46 percent of men's names and 25 percent of women's. (Note: DeMallie warned against relying on popular etymologies for names such as Crazy Horse, Man Afraid of His Horses, and Red Cloud as "endlessly repeated anecdotal evidence and folk etymologies" rather than documented meaning. He makes the same point concretely with the case of Charging Crow's youthful name "Boomer" (Uŋspóȟaŋ), whose sense is, in his words, "incomprehensible" without knowledge of the specific circumstance—there, a nighthawk/Iktomi story—behind its bestowal.)

== Early life ==
Spotted Elk (Lakota: Uŋpȟáŋ Glešká) was born about 1826, the son of Lakota Sioux chief Lone Horn (Heh-won-ge-chat). His family belonged to the Miniconjou ("Planters by the River") subgroup of the Teton Lakota (Sioux). In 1877, Spotted Elk became the chief of his tribe upon his 87 year-old father's death.

== Chief Spotted Elk ==
=== Skillful diplomat ===
As chief, Spotted Elk (who later became known by the name of "Big Foot" or Sitȟáŋka), was considered a great man of peace. He was best known among his people for his political and diplomatic successes. For instance, Spotted Elk was conciliatory Miniconjou leader known for diplomacy and efforts to safeguard his people during the Ghost Dance crisis by trying to convince them not to deliberately antagonize U.S. officials. He was skilled at settling mass quarrels and was often in great demand among other Teton bands.

=== Sitting Bull's coalition ===
During the 1870s the Miniconjou—Spotted Elk's band among them, alongside that of his brother Touch the Clouds—joined the loose, consent-based coalition that gathered around Sitting Bull's Hunkpapa camp in the buildup to the 1876 campaign; the alliance is better understood as parallel bands consenting to a common defense than as a unified command under Sitting Bull or any other single chief. Band after band arrived through the winter of 1875–1876 and into the following summer, the Miniconjou followed by the Sans Arcs, the Blackfeet, and the Wahpeton, until six tribal circles—Cheyenne, Hunkpapa, Oglala, Miniconjou, Sans Arc, and a scattering of Brulé and Wahpeton lodges—stood camped together at the Little Bighorn, each retaining its own chief and council even in common cause. Spotted Elk saw no major action in the Great Sioux War of 1876–1877 himself; his tribe nonetheless suffered in the fighting, and surrendered once it ended.

=== Reservation placement ===
Following the Sioux Wars, the government placed the Miniconjou on the Cheyenne River Indian Reservation, South Dakota. Spotted Elk encouraged adaptation to reservation life by way of developing sustainable agriculture and building schools for Lakota children. He was amongst the first American Indians to raise corn in accordance with government standards. Spotted Elk also advocated a peaceful attitude toward white settlers.

== Ghost Dance ==
By the late 1880s the Sioux were already living under severe deprivation. The 1889–1890 ration reductions imposed by the U.S. Government after the land‑cession agreements left many communities hungry and desperate. Food shortages, crop failures, and the collapse of the buffalo economy created a pervasive sense of crisis. The radical solution came in the form of the Ghost Dance movement, a new religion initiated by Paiute prophet Wovoka that imagined a newly created world. Several native leaders—including Good Thunder, Short Bull, and Kicking Bear—promulgated the spiritual message the Ghost Dance represented to the tribal communities within their reach. Spotted Elk and the Lakota became among the most enthusiastic believers in the "Ghost Dance" ceremony when it arrived among them in the spring of 1890. Although governmental reservation rules outlawed the practice of the religion, the movement swept like wildfire through the camps, and local Indian agents reacted with alarm. Some agents successfully suppressed the dancers, while others called for federal troops to restore order.

== Death at Wounded Knee Massacre ==
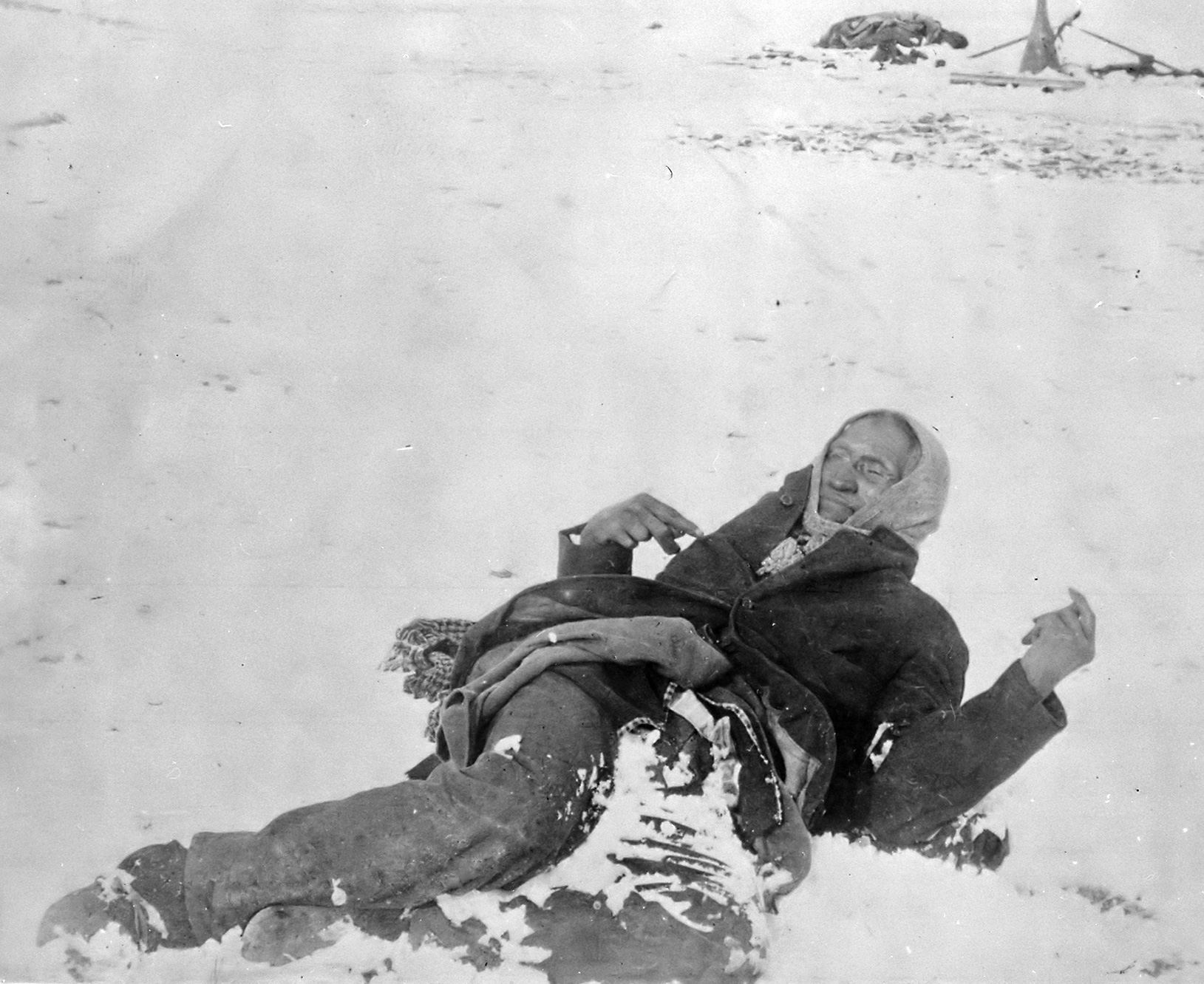
Miniconjou-Lakota-Sioux-Chief Spotted Elk lies dead after the massacre of Wounded Knee, 1890

=== Wounded Knee Massacre ===
Sitting Bull's death at Standing Rock on December 15, 1890—shot by Indian police sent to arrest him—read to many Lakotas as a warning of what the army intended for Ghost Dancers. For the already-anxious Miniconjous under Spotted Elk at Cheyenne River, that warning hardened into panic when John Dunn, a local squatter dispatched by the army to keep the band in place, convinced them the military planned instead to deport their tribesmen to an Atlantic island—advice on which Spotted Elk, gravely ill with pneumonia, led his people toward Pine Ridge on the night of December 23. Having misidentified the dying Spotted Elk as Sitting Bull's successor and thus a principal threat, the U.S. Army intercepted the band five days later and escorted it to Wounded Knee Creek, where a struggle during a weapons search on December 29 gave the 7th Cavalry cause to open fire, while at the same time, Hotchkiss guns on the surrounding hills shelled the camp below. The Seventh Cavalry killed more than 270 people—some 170 to 200 of them were non-combatant women and children—and Spotted Elk was among the dead. Sixteen photographs taken at the January 3 burial of 146 Lakota in a single mass grave, circulated with newspaper accounts of the killing, fixed Wounded Knee—and with it, Spotted Elk's frozen corpse—as the enduring image of U.S. Indian policy's violence.

==== Aftermath ====
In the wake of the Wounded Knee Massacre, the U.S. War Department awarded 20 soldiers of the 7th Cavalry with the Congressional Medal of Honor and in 1893, erected a monument at Fort Riley, Kansas to commemorate the death of U.S. forces and to celebrate the victory of "civilization" over savagery across North America. Native American tribes were unable to engage politically about the corresponding memory politics that the monument elicited and could not challenge the narrative publicly. Lakota tribesman Joseph Horn Cloud, who lost his parents and several siblings at Wounded Knee as a teenager, used his command of English to lead a survivors' campaign for justice. He filed compensation claims and directed the creation of the 1903 memorial obelisk, a deliberate challenge to the prevailing narrative surrounding Wounded Knee. Historian David Grua reports that the monument's inscription deliberately defined Spotted Elk not as a military leader but as a peacemaker who had done good deeds for both white and Native people—a characterization the Miniconjou survivors themselves chose to inscribe in stone, in direct rhetorical contrast to the U.S. Army's framing of him as Sitting Bull's dangerous successor.

== Bibliography ==
- Andersson, Rani-Henrik; Posthumus, David C. (2022). Lakhóta: An Indigenous History. Norman, OK: University of Oklahoma Press. ISBN 978-0-80619-075-4.
- Buecker, Thomas R. (1995). ""Can You Send Us Immediate Relief?": Army Expeditions to the Northern Black Hills, 1876–1878". South Dakota History. 25 (2). South Dakota State Historical Society: 95–115. ISSN 0361-8676.
- Carter, John E. (2004). "Wounded Knee Massacre". In Wishart, David J. (ed.). Encyclopedia of the Great Plains Indians. Lincoln: University of Nebraska Press. pp. 222–224. ISBN 978-0-80329-862-0.
- DeMallie, Raymond J. (2021). "Lakota Personal Names". Anthropological Linguistics. 63 (1/2): 69–79.
- Grua, David W. (2015). "'In Memory of the Chief Big Foot Massacre': The Wounded Knee Survivors and the Politics of Memory". Western Historical Quarterly. 46 (1): 31–51.
- Hämäläinen, Pekka (2019). Lakota America: A New History of Indigenous Power. New Haven: Yale University Press. ISBN 978-0-30021-595-3.
- Macfarlane, James (2010). ""Chief of All the Sioux": An Assessment of Sitting Bull and Lakota Unity, 1868–1876". American Nineteenth Century History. 11 (3): 299–320. doi:10.1080/14664658.2010.520929.
- McKee, Spencer (December 7, 2023). "'1 in 100,000' animal sighting caught on camera in Colorado". The Denver Gazette.
- Michno, Gregory (1997). Lakota Noon: The Indian Narrative of Custer's Defeat. Missoula, MT: Mountain Press Publishing Company. ISBN 978-0-87842-356-9.
- Ostler, Jeffrey (2010). The Lakotas and the Black Hills: The Struggle for Sacred Ground. New York: Penguin Books. ISBN 978-1-10119-028-9.
- Utley, Robert M. (2004). The Last Days of the Sioux Nation. New Haven: Yale University Press. ISBN 978-0-30010-316-8.
