= Lame Deer =

19th-century Lakota Indian chief

- Tȟáȟča Hušté

Miniconjou Lakota leader

Personal details
- Born: c. 1821
- Died: May 10, 1877 (aged 55–56) Montana Territory
- Resting place: Lame Deer, Montana
- Known for: Participation in the Battle of Little Big Horn and the Battle of Little Muddy Creek

Tȟáȟča Hušté or Lame Deer (c. 1821–1877), also called "The Elk that Whistles Running," was a first chief of the Miniconjou Lakota (trans. "They who plant by the water") and vice chief of the Wakpokinyan (trans. "To Fly along the river") band.

== Biography ==
Lame Deer was the second signatory of the 1865 Treaty With The Sioux-Miniconjou Band at Fort Sully, Dakota Territory (now just southeast of Pierre, South Dakota): "Tah-ke-chah-hoosh-tay, The Lame Deer, 1st chief of the Minneconjon band of Dakota or Sioux Indians". This group of Lakota were opposed to the 1868 Treaty of Fort Laramie, which required the Lakota to cede much of their territory to the United States. Lame Deer's band of Miniconjou participated in all of the fighting against United States troops during the Sioux War of 1876, including the Battle of the Greasy Grass, also known as the Battle of the Little Bighorn, where the combined Lakota and allied forces dealt an overwhelming defeat to United States forces.

Until 1877, Lame Deer and his followers continued to roam free around the Powder River area of Montana. The rest of the Sioux had surrendered to the United States or crossed into Canda with Sitting Bull. Colonel Nelson A. Miles tracked Lame Deer's group to a tributary of the Rosebud known to Euro-Americans as the Big Muddy and to the Sioux as Fat Horse Creek, about 1 mile southwest of the present-day town of Lame Deer, Montana. On May 7, 1877, soldiers under Miles' command attacked Lame Deer's encampment. Lame Deer was in the process of surrendering to Miles when a Euro-American scout aimed his rifle at Lame Deer. According to Miles, who was grasping Lame Deer's hand at the time, Lame Deer must have believed that he would be killed even if he surrendered. Lame Deer then pulled free and grabbed his rifle. He fired at Miles, missing him but killing a soldier. Lame Deer was shot in the ensuing gunfight and later died. Lame Deer was the grandfather of John Fire Lame Deer who was born in the twentieth century.
