= Miniconjou =

Lakota tribe

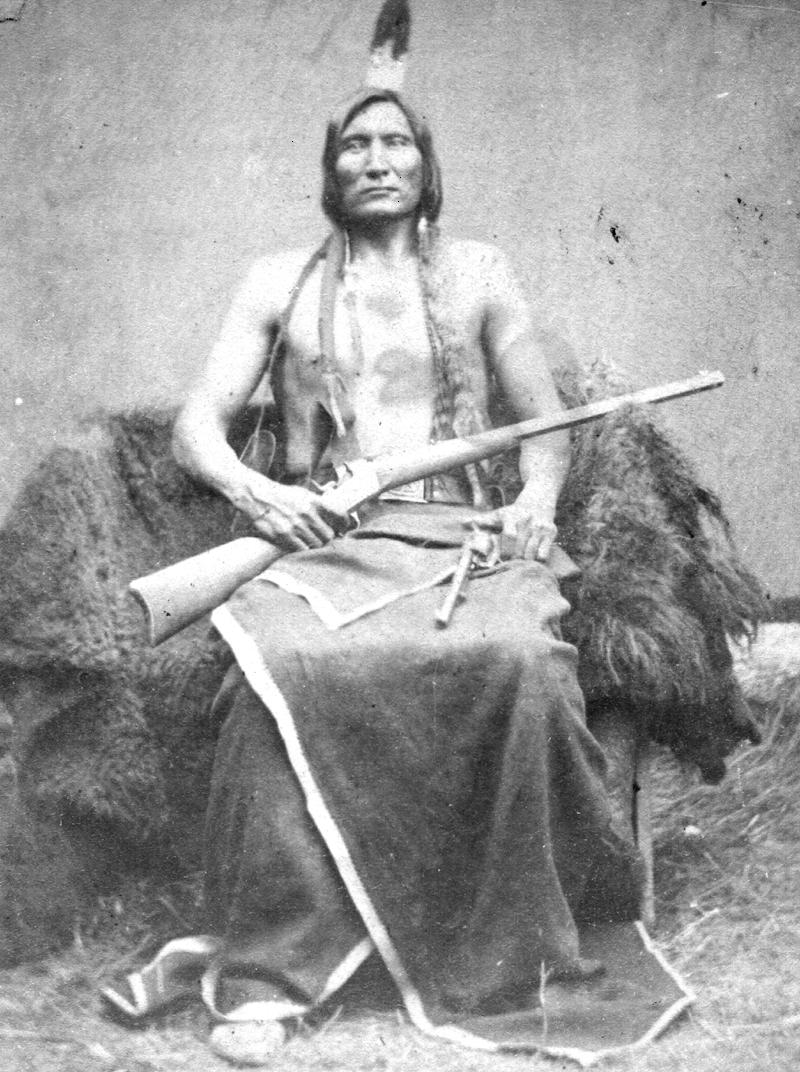
Touch the Clouds, by James H. Hamilton, taken at the Spotted Tail Agency, Nebraska, in the fall of 1877, Miniconjou chief

The Miniconjou (Lakota: Mnikowoju, Hokwoju – ‘Plants by the Water’) are a Native American people constituting a subdivision of the Lakota people, who formerly inhabited an area in western present-day South Dakota from the Black Hills in to the Platte River. The contemporary population lives mostly in west-central South Dakota. Perhaps the most famous Miniconjou chief was Touch the Clouds.

== Historic Miniconjou thiyóšpaye or bands ==
Together with the Sans Arc (Itázipčho, Itazipcola, Hazipco – ‘Those who hunt without bows’) and Two Kettles (Oóhe Núŋpa, Oóhenuŋpa, Oohenonpa – ‘Two Boiling’ or ‘Two Kettles’) they were often referred to as Central Lakota and divided into several bands or thiyóšpaye:

- Unkche yuta (‘Dung Eaters’)
- Glaglaheca (‘Untidy’, ‘Slovenly’, ‘Shiftless’)
- Shunka Yute Shni (‘Eat No Dogs’, split off from the Wanhin Wega)
- Nige Tanka (‘Big Belly’)
- Wakpokinyan (‘Flies Along the River’)
- Inyan ha oin (‘Musselshell Earring’)
- Siksicela or Shikshichela (‘Bad Ones’, ‘Bad ones of different kinds’)
- Wagleza-oin (‘Gartersnake Earring’)
- Wanhin Wega (‘Broken Arrow’, the Shunka Yute Shni and Oóhenuŋpa split off about 1840)
- Tall Bear

The Oóhenuŋpa or Two Kettles were first part of the Miniconjou thiyóšpaye called Wanhin Wega, split off about 1840 and became a separate oyate or tribe.

== Miniconjou leaders ==
Joseph White Bull (Ptesan Hunka) explained that prior to being confined to the reservation in the late 19th century, the Miniconjou recognized six hereditary leaders within their tribe, who were chosen from each clan. These men were:

- Kiyoukanpi 'Makes Room'
- Wahacanka Sapa 'Black Shield'
- He Isnala 'Lone Horn' of a Minneconjou band called the Wakpokinyan (Flies Along the Stream)
- White Hollow Horn
- Magaska 'White Swan'
- Okinyan 'Comes Flying'

These men became renowned war chiefs among the Miniconjou, rising through the ranks of the men's warrior societies. "They were treated as chiefs because of this," White Bull explained, "They wore shirts decorated with scalps." He identified these two leaders as:

- Taachka Ooshta 'Lame Deer'
- Wi Sapa 'Black Moon'

Other notable Miniconjou:

- Ituhu Hanska 'High Forehead'
- Kanku Wakatuya '(old) Hump' or 'High Backbone'
- White Bull, son of Makes Room
- Big Crow, son of Black Shield
- Maphiua Icahtagya 'Touch the Clouds', son of Lone Horn
- Mahto Cikala 'Little Bear', son of White Hollow Horn
- Magaska 'White Swan', son of White Swan
- Kiyoukanpi 'Comes Flying'
- Crazy Heart, son of Lame Deer
- Hehaka Galeshka 'Spotted Elk', son of Lone Horn, half-brother of Touches the Clouds
- Hehaka Galeshka 'Chief Spotted Elk', later known as Si Tanka 'Chief Big Foot'
- Dewey Beard
- Mahto Wanahtake 'Kicking Bear'
- Etokeah '(young) Hump'

== See also ==
- Red Horse (Lakota chief)
- Tomi Kay Phillips, president-designate of Sitting Bull College
