= Eagle Woman =

American peace activist (1820–1888)

- Waŋblí Ayútepiwiŋ
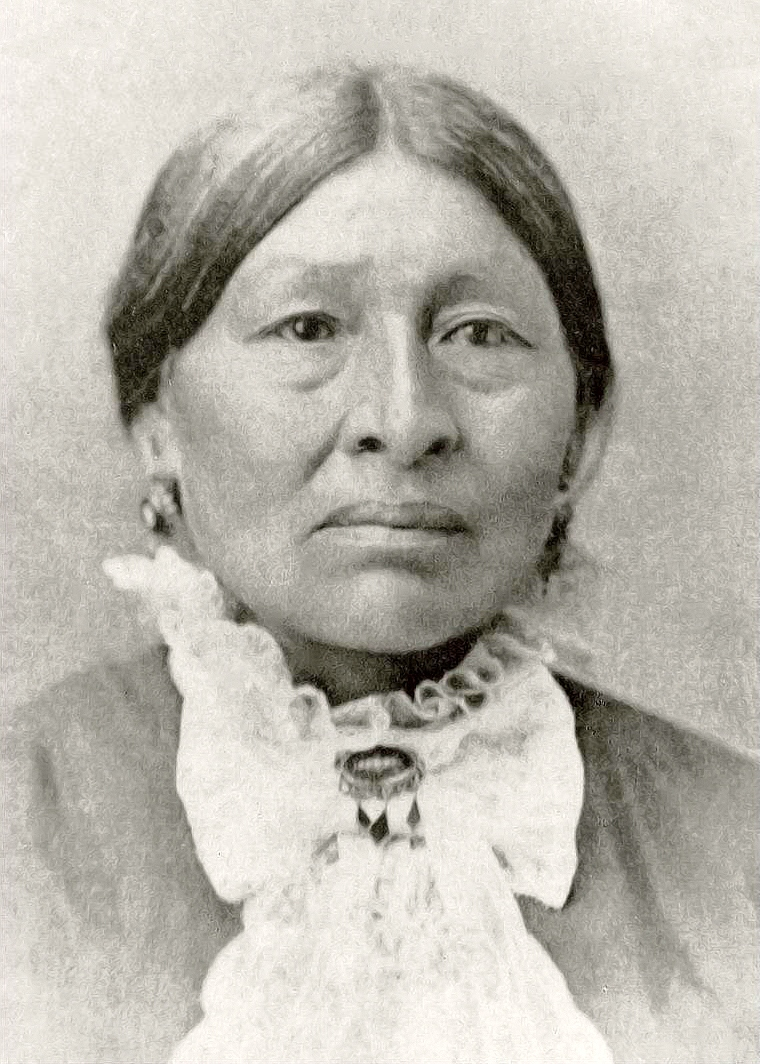
- Born: Eagle Woman That All Look At c. 1820; Two Kettles lodge near the Missouri River
- Died: December 18, 1888; Cannonball Ranch
- Other name: Matilda Galpin
- Known for: Peacekeeping, first woman recognized as a chief of the Sioux, first woman to sign a treaty with the U.S.
- Spouse(s): Honoré Picotte, Charles Galpin
- Parent(s): Two Lance, Rosy Light of Dawn

Eagle Woman That All Look At (Lakota: Waŋblí Ayútepiwiŋ, (Note: Also known as Wambdi or Wanbli Autepewin in some sources.) also known as Matilda Picotte Galpin; c. 1820 – December 18, 1888) was a Lakota activist, diplomat, trader, and translator, who was known for her efforts mediating the conflicts between white settlers, the United States government, and the Sioux. She is credited with being the only woman recognized as a chief among the Sioux.

Eagle Woman's early diplomacy was for peace, while her efforts after the relocations to reservations focused on convincing the Sioux to adapt to the new era and compromise. She materially supported the Sioux when the U.S. government forced tribes to sustain themselves on barren reservation lands. She was in part responsible for the party of leaders sent to sign the Second Treaty of Fort Laramie in 1868, though she opposed the Standing Rock treaty of 1876, and became the first woman to sign a treaty with the United States government in 1882.

She won a local trade war, when government official attempted to shut down her trading post to establish a monopoly on the reservation, and continued to serve as a mediator and community leader throughout white encroachment on native lands during the Black Hills Gold Rush, including being selected by the U.S. government as part of a delegation to Washington, D.C. in 1872.

Eagle Woman and her daughter Louise organized the first day school at Standing Rock Indian Reservation. She continued aiding the tribes in adjusting to reservation life until her death in 1888. In 2010, she was inducted into the South Dakota Hall of Fame.

== Early life ==
Eagle Woman was born in a Sioux lodge near the Missouri River, around 45 miles (72 km) south of modern-day Pierre, South Dakota, to a distinguished leader of the "peace-seeking" Two Kettles Tribe, Chief Two Lance, and Rosy Light of Dawn, a Hunkpapa. (Note: The Hunkpapa were the tribe of Sitting Bull, and would be among the most persistent in fighting settlers and the government to maintain their independence.) She was the youngest of eight children, and her later leadership would be influenced by the example set by her father. She spent her childhood in what would become western South Dakota and had little contact with white culture or government. She was 13 when her father died in 1833, to be buried by the Cheyenne River, and in 1837, her mother died of smallpox after the tribes fled the rivers to escape the disease.

In 1838, after her parents' deaths, she married Canadian fur trader Honoré Picotte, (Note: At the time, around 20 years her elder.) a prestigious general agent in the top position in the Upper Missouri region, with the American Fur Company working at Fort Pierre. It has been claimed that such marriages were mutually beneficial: for Native women, marrying a trader elevated their status (though it is not stated if their status was elevated with the tribe, with the Europeans, or both) with the added benefits of access to goods, while for traders, the marriage improved their trade relations with the Native tribes. Picotte had previously married a woman from another Sioux band in 1829, and then a French woman in 1831, and had children from both marriages. Eagle Woman, while living at the fort, adopted the settlers' lifestyle, but as Picotte often spent long periods of time away, she would return to her tribe. Eagle Woman had two daughters with Picotte, who in 1848 retired and moved back to live with his white wife in St. Louis.

== Diplomacy ==
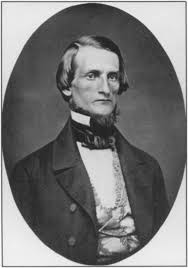
Charles Galpin in 1856

In 1850, Eagle Woman married Picotte's protégé at the company, Charles Galpin, with whom she had two more daughters and three sons, (Note: Sources differ on the number of children Eagle Woman had. The Encyclopedia Britannica records that she had four daughters and three sons, Samuel, Robert, and Richard. Gray records that she had four sons and four daughters, that none of her sons survived, but her "four daughters carried on their mother's good work". Gray elsewhere records that the last of Eagle Woman's sons, Sammy, died in 1872 of tuberculosis at age 22.) all of whom were given a European education.

Eagle Woman "frequently spoke out against cruelty of any kind, whether committed by whites or by Indians," and she found opportunity to do so throughout her life.

While tensions rose in 1854, the couple established successful trade operations in the area's dwindling post-Civil War economy and resolved multiple conflicts between the settlers and tribes in the area. Though they both acted as translators at times, much of the peacekeeping was based on her prestige and reputation.

The family stayed for a time in Fort Benton, Montana beginning in 1860, as Galpin had taken a position with LaBarge, Harkness & Company. There, Eagle Woman's son William died on August 26. The family traveled down river toward their ancestral home for William's burial, eventually contracting to deliver 10 miners to Fort Randall on their way. En route, the couple was surrounded by Santee Sioux who had recently led the Lake Shetek massacre; however, one of the warriors recognized Eagle Woman and allowed them passage after she informed them that she had gifts for the local lodge and was also transporting one of her sons for burial. The Galpins negotiated the release of some of the Santee's captives upon reaching Fort LaFramboise, and a party was dispatched to ransom the two women and four children. (Note: According to one 1922 source, "there now stands on the site of White Lodge's camp, a shaft to commemorate this event [the freeing of the captives] and in honor of Eagle Woman." However, other sources which deal with the occurrence do not mention this detail.)

In 1865, she protected a wounded white soldier with her shawl, after he had been ambushed and shot with three arrows. (Note: She reportedly told his attackers, "This man belongs to me now! You cannot touch him!" after which they retreated as soldiers from the local fort arrived.) (Note: The soldier would die some days later, and one of the men who attacked him, Circling Bear, "told Eagle Woman if he had known she was the one protecting the officer, he would have killed her, too.") In 1866, she began traveling alone to negotiate peace, speaking at Sioux councils along the Little Missouri River.

Father Pierre-Jean De Smet sought out Eagle Woman in 1868, as she, "being of Sioux birth and a near relation to several war leaders, [exercised] great influence among her people." He had been sent on a mission to request that Sitting Bull move his people to a reservation. (Note: They appear to have been accompanied on this errand by Running Antelope and Thunder Hawk.) The Galpins and De Smet traveled with a party of other Sioux to Sitting Bull's camp. She later recounted that she had to persuade Sitting Bull's people not to kill De Smet, after his delegation's arrival was met with a band of hostile warriors. (Note: However, De Smet and Charles never noted feeling threatened.) Though the camp leader did not accept De Smet's request, he sent several other leaders who would go on to sign the Second Treaty of Fort Laramie in 1868. This treaty established the Great Sioux Reservation, and thus Eagle Woman's family moved with the tribes to their newly established boundaries, setting up their new trading post at Grand River. For their efforts in facilitating the successful negotiations, Galpin was appointed to the post of agency interpreter, at a salary of $150 monthly.

Formerly an advocate for peace, Eagle Woman found a new purpose in helping her people adapt to their new conditions, now that peace had been achieved, albeit temporarily.

=== Life on the reservation ===
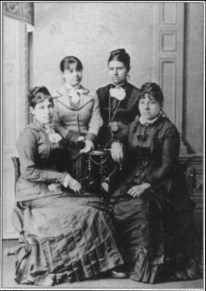
Eagle Woman's daughters, from left to right, Lulu Picotte Harmon, Annie Galpin, Alma Galpin Parkin, and Louise Picotte DeGrey-Von Solen, c. 1880

The move to the reservation required Galpin to leave his previous employment and become an independent trader, for which he needed a fresh stock of supplies. To this end, the family traveled to St. Louis, where they also sought to retrieve their daughter Lulu who was attending school there. There, De Smet introduced Eagle Woman to William Tecumseh Sherman, who was at the time, leading the very Indian Peace Commission that had just completed the treaty with the Sioux, and was now tasked with implementing it.

On the reservation, Eagle Woman set up a trade post and became known for her generosity and dedication to the tribes' independence. She involved her entire family in her efforts. As the government forced the Sioux into farming on barren land, a way of life that was alien and bewildering to these people of the open plains, and with little of the aid promised in the treaty, the Galpins distributed goods for free to the needy.

She continued her activism for peace by defusing conflicts in person and alone, and by refusing to trade in firearms or ammunition. As the result of a dispute over the injury of a man for killing one of the cows belonging to the Indian agency, an angry mob of 5,000 gathered at the agency office, threatening the whites inside. (Note: This story was reportedly recounted by Eagle Woman to historian Frances C. Holley, from Bismarck, North Dakota.) Eagle Woman marched to meet the crowd at dawn. She shamed the crowd, telling them they were "not brave to come here to kill a half-dozen white men!" She contacted the military representative for the reservation, and had him supply provisions for a "feast of reconciliation", and she distributed gifts to those she knew felt the most slighted.

One of the white men Eagle Woman saved on that day was probably Lieutenant William Harmon, who later married her daughter Lulu. Having given her blessing to Harmon and Lulu, Eagle Woman traveled with her daughter by river boat and train to Chicago, to obtain a wedding dress. However, before the ceremony could commence, on November 30, 1869, Charles Galpin fell ill and died. (Note: Joseph H. Taylor, a trapper who had arrived in the area in 1869, recounted that the death "was sudden, but attributed to natural causes by the agency physician who attended [Charles Galpin].) This left Eagle Woman, along with her children, to take over the trade post as the territory's first Sioux businesswoman. She continued her generosity as before. Lulu and Harmon were married on July 26, 1870 in Sioux City, Iowa. Lulu's godfather, de Smet, gave her away at the ceremony.

=== 1872 delegation ===
In 1872, the U.S. government chose Eagle Woman to select a delegation of leaders, bring them to Washington, D.C., and interpret for them. They traveled by river to Sioux City, and then by train through Chicago, arriving in Washington on September 15.

The trip was ostensibly to discuss the Treaty of Fort Laramie. In actuality, it was "to impress the Sioux with the power, size and sheer material achievements of white society." To this end, the delegation spent much of their two weeks in the city touring the local arsenal and naval yard. They also met with Sherman, Columbus Delano, then Secretary of the Interior, as well as President Ulysses S. Grant. They skipped a planned tour of Boston, and after a boat tour of Manhattan, returned home by the end of October.

=== Trade disputes ===
In 1873, the agency at Grand River was moved to Standing Rock on account of flooding, and Eagle Woman followed, setting up her new trading post there. The following year, the government revoked the sutlership (Note: Their authorization to trade with military personnel) for traders throughout the area of the Sioux reservation, preferring instead a monopoly for Orvil L. Grant, brother of President Grant. This included the permission under which Eagle Woman's son-in-law Harmon was trading. Once established, Grant and his business partners "applied every force at its command to put Eagle Woman out of business," but she proved "utterly unflappable".

Suspecting that Eagle Woman's store was serving as a front for Harmon's goods (Harmon had in-fact sold his excess goods to Eagle Woman after he was driven out of business), the local commissioner sought to put an end to her trade, but was prevented by a local uprising over the deaths of two white soldiers. Eagle Woman herself helped to mediate this dispute that had delayed the shuttering of her own store, and Harmon wrote on her behalf to congressman John T. Averill.

Again pressed to close her business, the local Indian agent replied that he had ordered Eagle Woman to comply, but she "declines to obey on the grounds that she is an Indian and entitled to trade with her people in order to support her family." The agent was replaced on account of his failure, and Eagle Woman ignored commands from the replacement as well. The commander of Fort Yates, when ordered to close her store, refused, and the local US Marshall, ordered to confiscate her goods, did the same. Within a matter of months, the association of political power in Washington, who had conspired against Eagle Woman in favor of Grant and associates, began to collapse, and the campaign against Eagle Woman was abandoned.

By 1876, Eagle Woman had turned the Indian agent into an ally, and had coordinated with him to establish the first Catholic day school in the area, with books and supplies provided for the students, and her own daughter Louise hired as instructor.

=== Black Hills Gold Rush ===
The Black Hills Gold Rush began in 1874 as word spread of the discovery of gold in lands owned by the Sioux, including the Black Hills, according to the terms of the Treaty of Fort Laramie six years prior. This quickly lead to violations of the treaty on the part of thousands of miners immigrating to the area, and subsequent increases in violent conflicts. (Note: At least one source, The Bismarck Tribune reported that Eagle Woman was the "first recorded person to discover gold in the Black Hills" when she "noticed something shiny in the water" as a child, but kept the discovery secret, as she was warned by others, specifically De Smet that "the white man will want this land" if she revealed what she found. However, Gray among the most detailed accounts of Eagle Woman, and himself cited and held in high regard by other sources, does not appear to make any mention of this at all. It is therefore unclear to what extent the account of The Bismarck Tribune may be relied upon.)

During this period, Eagle Woman continued her mediation efforts and material generosity to her people. In a conference in 1875, she led the Grand River delegation, most of whom were unarmed. She, along with Hunkpapa leaders and thousands of Lakota warriors, including Red Cloud and Spotted Tail, met with the Indian commissioners backed by a hundred cavalry. The meeting accomplished nothing, and negotiations broke down on the verge of violence, which Eagle Woman helped to mediate and avoid. Elsewhere among the attendees were a band of "roamers", from the unceded territory of the Sioux, (Note: For further information regarding the nature of the "unceded territory, see Treaty of Fort Laramie (1868)#Article XVI) along with two bands of police from Standing Rock, one led by They Even Fear His Horses, and the other led by friends of Eagle Woman. When the roamers became unruly, "singing defiance and brandishing their weapons", the police force moved to separate them from the federal troops, and to form a protective ring around the commissioners.

Following the meeting, Eagle Woman was recognized as a chief "for her heroism in saving the lives of the Black Hills commission". Lakota historian LaDonna Brave Bull Allard credits her as "the only female Sioux chief".

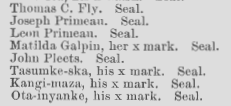
Signature of Eagle Woman as recorded in a transcript of the 1882 Standing Rock treaty, as compiled by the Secretary of the Interior

As the Great Sioux War of 1876 began over the continued violation of Sioux ownership of the Black Hills, Eagle Woman did not take part in negotiations following the failed attempt of 1875. She did not support the "Sell or Starve" policies and the Act of 1877, which resolved to cut off all government rations to the Sioux until they agreed to peacefully cede the Black Hills. This came to pass in the signing of treaties in October, which led to the creation of the Standing Rock Indian Reservation. After the loss, she again took up her role of helping the tribes adapt to this new reservation life.

Though Eagle Woman opposed the founding of the reservation and did not sign the 1876 treaty, she signed an 1882 treaty which reserved land for schools, modified reservation boundaries, and changed the government workers and rations they received. Her assent was recorded at the Standing Rock Agency, November 30, 1882, "Matilda Galpin, her x mark. Seal" as the only woman to sign among the chiefs and headmen of the Sioux, making her the first woman to sign a treaty with the United States. (Note: The treaty was later deemed invalid, as it never achieved the required signatures of three fourths of the adult males among the tribes.)

== Later life and death ==
I desire to introduce to your kind consideration the brave Sitting Bull. Since Sitting Bull has been at this agency, we have cultivated very kindly relations and feelings, and I believe that he is going to remain quiet and induce his followers to be quiet and obedient while in the hands of the authorities. His whole future will depend upon his conduct the next six months. Please impress him with this.
Your affectionate mother

— Eagle Woman, Letter to Charles Picotte, Yankton Agency

Eagle Woman spent her final years at the Standing Rock Indian Reservation with friends, her daughters, and grandchildren. She met briefly with Sitting Bull in 1881 after his surrender, as he passed through Fort Yates on his way to internment as a prisoner of war at Fort Randall. She wrote to her stepson, Charles Picotte, at Yankton Agency to look after Sitting Bull.

On December 18, 1888, Eagle Woman died at her daughter Alma's home, the Cannonball Ranch in modern-day Morton County, North Dakota. Though none of her sons had made it to adulthood, she died surrounded by her daughters.

Eagle Woman was buried next to Galpin at the Fort Yates cemetery. No announcement of her death has been found in the papers of the time. In the mid-20th century her remains were relocated by the Army Corps of Engineers as part of the construction of Lake Oahe.

Alma continued her generosity to white and Native people alike in the area, and Alma's own funeral was attended by over a thousand people.

== Legacy ==
Eagle Woman was inducted into the South Dakota Hall of Fame as a Champion of Excellence in 2010, for her "attempts at peaceful compromise" between "Native American Indian and white societies".

The Bismarck Tribune called her "'the most noted Indian woman of all the western Indian nations,' next to Sakakawea."

In 2016, the location of her former grave site was one of several disputed as part of the Dakota Access Pipeline protests.

== See also ==
- Black Hills Land Claim, ongoing dispute between the Sioux and the US Government
- List of Lakota people
- Population history of indigenous peoples of the Americas
