= List of Lakota people =

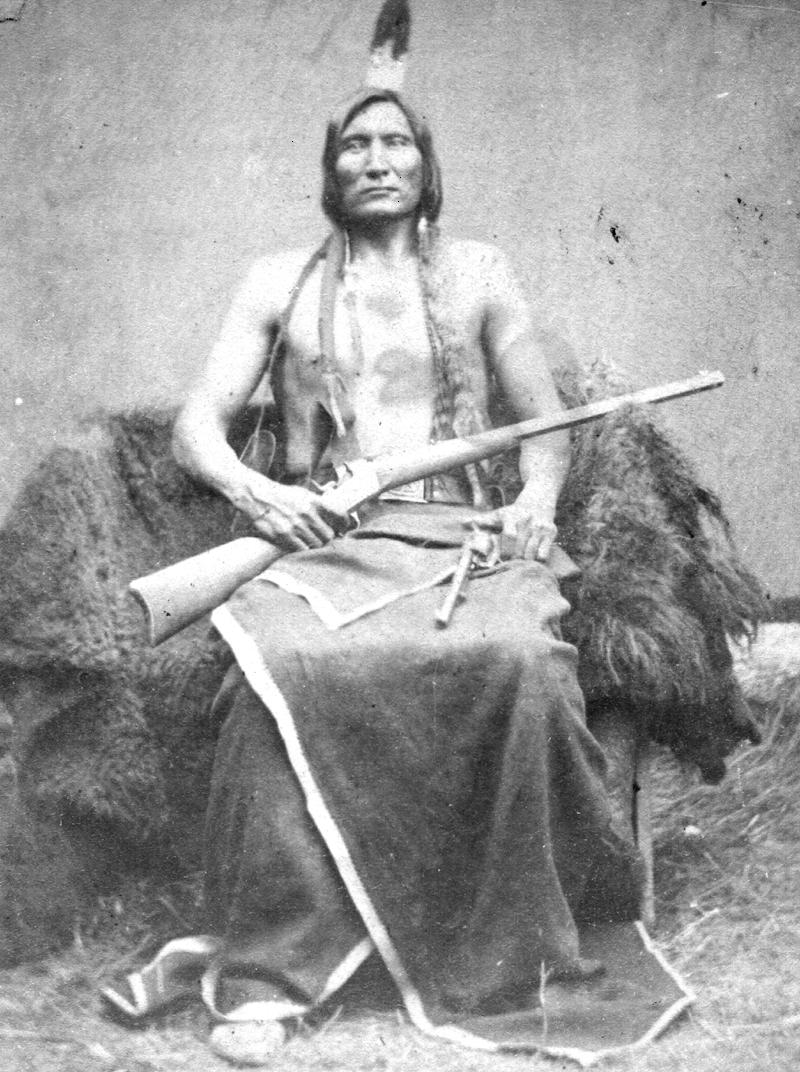
Touch the Clouds, photo by James H. Hamilton, Spotted Tail Agency, Nebraska, in the fall of 1877

This is a list of notable people of Lakota ancestry.

- Arthur Amiotte (Waŋblí Ta Hóčhoka Wašté) (born 1942), Oglala artist, educator, curator, and author
- Black Elk (Heȟáka Sápa) (1863–1950), Oglala Heyoka and cousin of Crazy Horse
- Black Hawk (Čhetáŋ Sápa) (ca. 1832–1890?), Sans Arc artist and medicine man
- Mary Brave Bird (1954–2013), Sicangu writer and activist
- Nathan Chasing His Horse (born 1976), actor
- Crow Dog (also Kȟaŋǧí Šúŋka, Jerome Crow Dog; 1833 – 1912) was a Brulé Lakota subchief, born at Horse Stealing Creek, Montana Territory, and is responsible for one of the final U.S. Supreme Court cases that unanimously supports tribal sovereignty – Ex parte Crow Dog, 109 U.S. 556 (1883)
- Crazy Horse (Tȟašúŋke Witkó) (c. 1840–1877), Oglala war leader known for the Battle of the Little Bighorn
- Eagle Woman (Waŋblí Ayútepiwiŋ) (1820–1888), Two Kettle and Hunkpapa diplomat, trader, and peace activist
- Gall (Phizí) (c. 1840–1894), Hunkpapa battle leader
- Tim Giago (Nanwica Kciji) (1934-2022) Oglala publisher and journalist
- Kicking Bear (Matȟó Wanáȟtaka) (1846–1904), Oglala activist and warrior
- Lame Deer (Tȟáȟča Hušté) (died 1877), Miniconjou medicine man
- Eddie Little Sky (1926–1997), Oglala Lakota actor
- Kevin Locke (Tȟokéya Inážiŋ) (born 1954), Hunkpapa hoop dancer and flute player
- Karina Lombard (born 1969), Lakota-descent actress
- Russell Means (Waŋblí Ohítika) (1939–2012), Oglala activist and actor
- Ed McGaa, Oglala Lakota author, CPT US Marine Corp F-4 Phantom Fighter Pilot
- Beatrice Medicine (Híŋša Wašté Aglí Wiŋ) (1923–2005) anthropologist and LGBTQ activist
- Billy Mills (Tamakhóčhe Theȟíla) (born 1938), Oglala Olympic gold medalist
- Rain-in-the-Face (Ité Omáǧažu) (1835–1905), Hunkpapa war chief who fought in the Battle of Little Bighorn
- Red Cloud (Maȟpíya Lúta) (1822–1909), Oglala leader
- Red Shirt (Ógle Lúta) (1847–1925), Oglala chief, warrior, and statesman
- Luther Standing Bear (Óta Kté or Matȟó Nážiŋ) (1868–1939), Oglala Lakota author, actor, and rights activist
- Sitting Bull (Tȟatȟáŋka Íyotake) (1831–1890), Hunkpapa chief and holy man
- Eddie Spears (born 1982), Lower Brulé actor
- Michael Spears (born 1977), Lower Brulé actor
- Spotted Tail (Siŋté Glešká) (1823–1881), Brulé warrior and leader and uncle of Crazy Horse
- Moses Stranger Horse (1890–1941), Brulé artist
- Touch the Clouds (Maȟpíya Ičaȟtagye) (1838–1905), Minneconjou chief
- Dyani White Hawk (born 1976) Sicangu artist and former curator of All My Relations Arts gallery
- Frank Waln (born 1989), Sicangu rap artist and activist
- Zahn McClarnon (born 1966), Hunkpapa Lakota actor
- Pappy Boyington (1912–1998), Medal of Honor and Navy Cross recipient COL (USMC)
- Debra White Plume (Wioweya Najin Win) (1954–2020), Native American activist
- Danielle SeeWalker, artist and activist
- Kyrie Irving, NBA player for the Dallas Mavericks (through mother)
