= Two Kettles =

Subtribe of the Lakota people

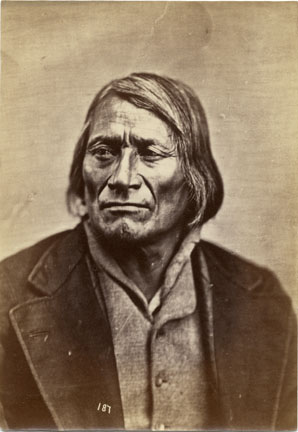
Miwátani Háŋska (Tall or Long Mandan), a Two Kettles chief

The Two Kettles or Two Boilings are one of the seven subtribes of the Lakota people who, along with the Dakota, make up the Očhéthi Šakówiŋ (Seven Council Fires). They reside on the Cheyenne River Indian Reservation.

Together with the Itazipcho (Itázipčho - 'Without Bows') and Miniconjou (Mnikȟáŋwožu or Hoȟwožu - 'Plants by the Water') they are referred to as Central Lakota and divided into several bands or tiyošpaye.

== Historic Oóhenuŋpa thiyóšpaye or bands ==
- Wanúŋwaktenula (Wah-nee-wack-ata-o-ne-lar, a.k.a. Waniwacteonila - 'Killed Accidentally')
- Šúŋka Yúte šni ('Eat No Dogs')
- Mnišála ('Red Water', a splinter group from the Itázipčho tiyošpaye, also called Mnišála- 'Red Water')
- Oíglapta ('Take All That Is Left')

The Oóhenuŋpa or Two Kettles were first part of the Mnikȟáŋwožu thiyóšpaye called Wáŋ Nawéǧa ('Arrow broken with the feet'), split off about 1840 and became a separate oyáte or tribe.

According to ethnologist James Owen Dorsey, the Oóhenuŋpa were divided into two groups:

1. Oohe noⁿpa (Oóhenuŋpa proper)
2. Ma waqota (Há waȟóta - 'Skin streaked grayish')

== History ==
Before 1843 explorers give no reference to this subdivision. The band appeared to number 800 people. At the usual average of seven people per lodge, that would make about 115 lodges (tepees when unoccupied), equating to 230 warriors at the norm of two per lodge. They were varyingly claimed to live among other herds of buffalo, or to live separate from other bands by the Cheyenne River and the Missouri River. They respected white traders and visitors and hunted skillfully. Early on they rarely engaged in warfare but later did so. Later still they signed a treaty agreeing not to attack others except in self-defense.

== Notable Two Kettle Lakota people ==
- Miwátani Háŋska (Tall or Long Mandan), Two Kettles chief
- Waŋblí Ayútepiwiŋ (Eagle Woman) (1820–1888), Two Kettle and Hunkpapa diplomat, trader, and peace activist
