= Lakota people =

Indigenous people of the Great Plains

Lakota
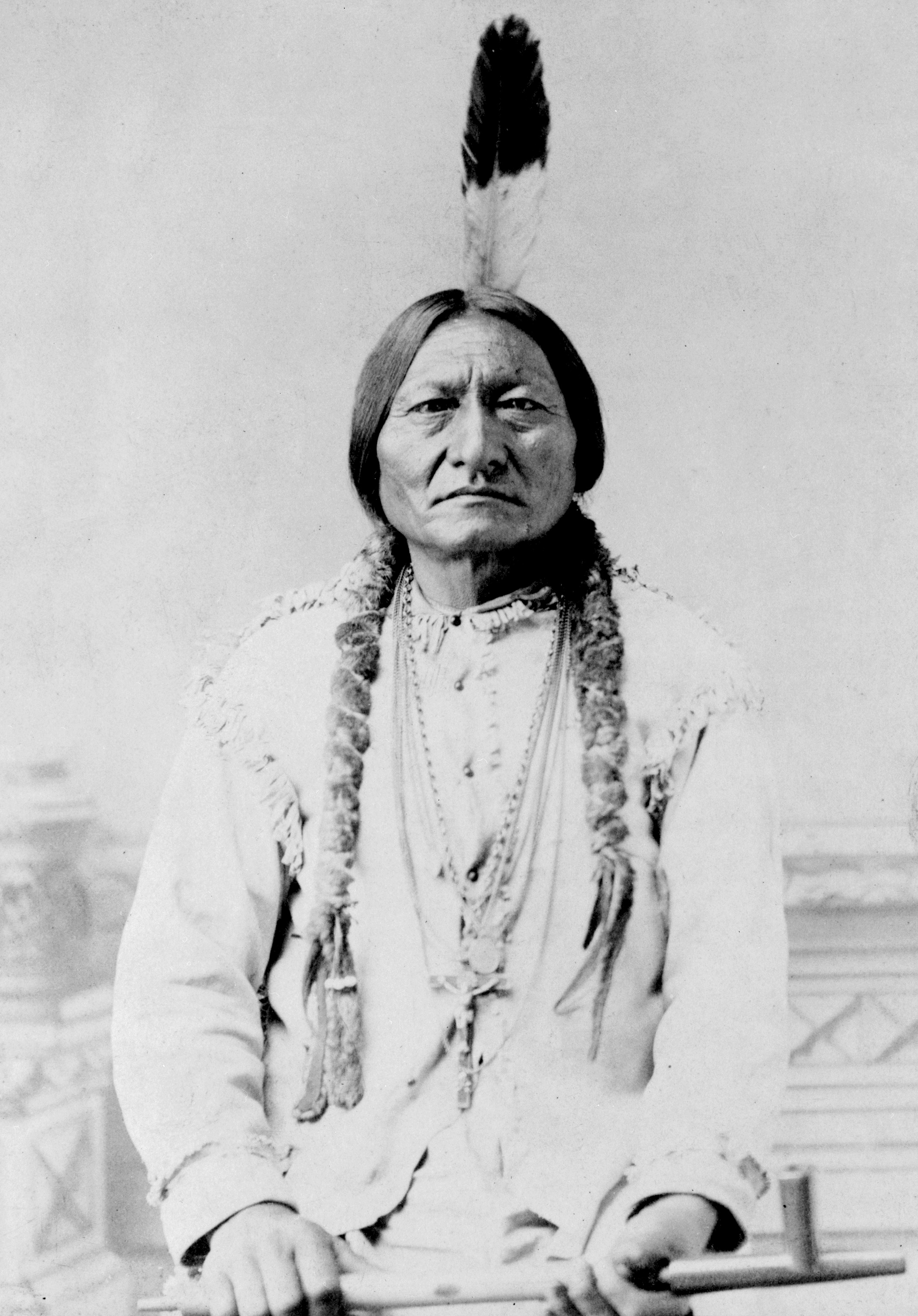
- Sitting Bull, a Hunkpapa Lakota chief and holy man, c. 1831 – December 15, 1890

Total population
- 172,982

Regions with significant populations
- United States (North Dakota and South Dakota); Canada (Manitoba and Saskatchewan)

Languages
- English, Lakota

Religion
- Wocekiye, Lakota religion

Related ethnic groups
- Other Sioux peoples (Santee, Sisseton Wahpeton Oyate, Yankton, Yanktonai)

Lakota transl. 'ally' or 'friend
- People: Lakȟóta Oyáte
- Language: Lakȟótiyapi; Wíyutȟapi
- Country: Lakȟóta Makóce, Očhéthi Šakówiŋ

Oglala Sioux tribal flag

Lakota beaded storage bag, late 19th century, 15 in (38 cm) wide, Cleveland Museum of Art

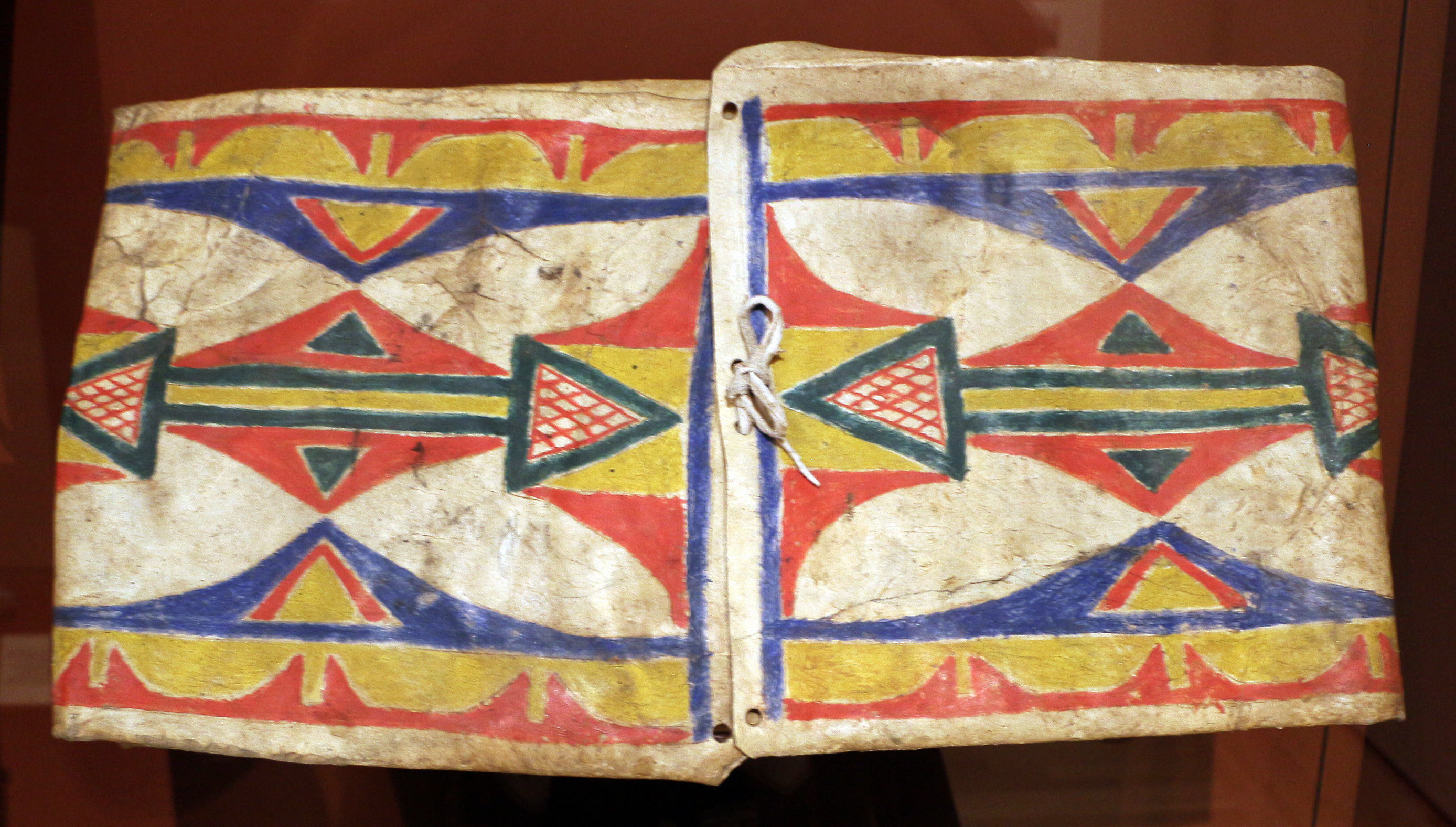
Lakota parfleche, c. 1890, Speed Art Museum

The Lakota (Lakota: Lakȟóta or Lakhóta, pronounced [laˈkˣɔta]) are a Native American people. Also known as the Teton Sioux (from Thítȟuŋwaŋ), they are one of the three prominent subcultures of the Sioux people, with the Eastern Dakota (Santee) and Western Dakota (Wičhíyena). Their current lands are in North and South Dakota. They speak Lakȟótiyapi—the Lakota language, the westernmost of three closely related languages that belong to the Siouan language family. Originally based around the western Great Lakes, the Lakota were pushed onto the northern Great Plains during the seventeenth century by conflicts with the Anishinaabe and Cree; after adopting horse culture around 1730, they crossed the Missouri River and established themselves in the Black Hills by the 1770s as the spiritual center of their territory.

The 1851 Fort Laramie Treaty recognized Lakota sovereignty over much of the central Plains in exchange for passage along the Oregon Trail; the 1868 treaty, concluding Red Cloud's War, closed the Black Hills to white settlement "for as long as the river flows and the eagle flies," a guarantee the 1874 discovery of gold there rendered meaningless within two years. The resulting Great Sioux War culminated in the destruction of Custer's column at the Battle of the Little Bighorn in 1876, but a reinforced army ended Lakota resistance by 1877, confining the bands to reservations under a Black Hills cession treaty whose legitimacy remains disputed. Conflict flared a final time in 1890, when the killing of Sitting Bull at Standing Rock was followed two weeks later by the Wounded Knee Massacre, during which the 7th Cavalry killed more than 250 Lakota men, women, and children—an event that has endured as a defining symbol of U.S. policy toward Native nations.

Today the Lakota live primarily on five reservations in South Dakota—Pine Ridge, Rosebud, Lower Brule, Cheyenne River, and Standing Rock—with further communities in North Dakota, Nebraska, Montana, and the Canadian provinces of Manitoba and Saskatchewan, the latter descended from bands that fled north during the Minnesota and Black Hills wars. Each reservation is governed by an elected tribal council as a "domestic dependent nation" of the federal government. In 1980 the U.S. Supreme Court awarded the Sioux nations $122 million for the Black Hills taking in United States v. Sioux Nation of Indians, a settlement the tribes have refused on the grounds that acceptance would extinguish their claim to the land, leaving the award to accrue interest in a federal account now worth over $1 billion. A 2007 declaration of independence by a faction associated with Russell Means was repudiated by the tribes' elected governments.

The seven bands or "sub-tribes" of the Lakota are:

- Sičháŋǧu (Brulé, Burned Thighs)
- Oglála ("They Scatter Their Own")
- Itázipčho (Sans Arc, Without Bows)
- Húŋkpapȟa (Hunkpapa, "Camps at the End of the Camp Circle")
- Mnikȟówožu (Miniconjou, "Planters by the Water")
- Sihásapa ("Blackfeet" or "Blackfoot")
- Oóhenuŋpa (Two Kettles)

Notable Lakota figures include Tȟatȟáŋka Íyotake (Sitting Bull) and Tȟašúŋke Witkó (Crazy Horse), leaders during the Plains wars; Maȟpíya Lúta (Red Cloud) and Siŋté Glešká (Spotted Tail), prominent in treaty diplomacy; Heȟáka Sápa (Black Elk); and, among more recent activists, Russell Means (Oglála).

== History ==
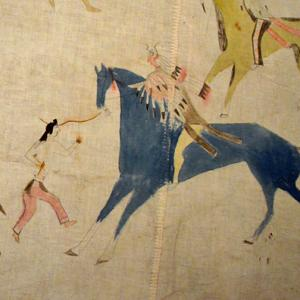
Scenes of battle and horse raiding decorate a muslin Lakota tipi from the late 19th or early 20th century

=== Lakota origin records and legends ===
Early Lakota history is recorded in their winter counts (Lakota: waníyetu wówapi), pictorial calendars painted on hides or later recorded on paper. The Battiste Good winter count records Lakota history to 900 CE, when White Buffalo Calf Woman gave the Lakota people the White Buffalo Calf Pipe. According to this legend, which remains central to Lakota religious tradition, the very beautiful Ptesáŋwiŋ (White Buffalo Woman) appeared to two hunters, destroyed the one who approached her with impure intentions, and then presented the sacred buffalo calf pipe (ptehíŋčala čhaŋnúŋpa) to the people through the chief Standing Hollow Horn—its bowl of red stone representing the Earth, its wooden stem all growing things, its twelve eagle feathers all winged creatures, together binding the Lakota to every element of the universe through prayer to Wakȟáŋ Tȟáŋka. Departing, she transformed successively into a red-and-brown calf, a white buffalo, and a black buffalo—bowing to the four quarters of the universe before disappearing—with a promise to return at the end. The pipe she left behind was not merely a ritual object but the symbolic center of Lakota cosmology: its fire the universe's focal point, its smoke a direct conduit to the Great Mystery, and White Buffalo Woman herself the mediating link between the sacred and the human. (Note: For more on the tale around White Buffalo Calf Woman, see the following sources: Erdoes, Richard, and Alfonso Ortiz, eds., American Indian Myths and Legends. New York: Pantheon Books, 1984; Jahner, Elaine A. "Lakota Genesis: The Oral Tradition," in Sioux Indian Religion: Tradition and Innovation, ed. Raymond J. DeMallie and Douglas R. Parks. Norman, OK: University of Oklahoma Press, 1987; Brown, Joseph Epes ed., The Sacred Pipe: Black Elk's Account of the Seven Rites of the Oglala Sioux (Norman: University of Oklahoma Press, 1953.)

=== Early history ===
Siouan-language speakers originated in the central Mississippi Valley, part of a larger movement of Siouan-speaking peoples whose gradual northwestward migration was triggered in part by the collapse of the Mississippian mound-building cultures and their great center at Cahokia from the 12th century onward. The ancestral Sioux shifted slowly northwestward until they reached the pine-oak forests spreading west from the Great Lakes; the Lakota—the westernmost of the Očhethi Šakowiŋ (Seven Council Fires)—pushed farthest, settling on lands toward the Minnesota Valley, a transition zone where Eastern Woodlands and western grasslands met. The Lakota's own tradition tells a different story of origins, holding that the people emerged from Wind Cave in the Black Hills and that their long migration eastward and eventual return was simply a journey home rather than an arrival anywhere new, but this will likely remain Lakota oral accounting and no additional corroboration is available.

In the late 16th and early 17th centuries, Dakota-Lakota speakers lived in the upper Mississippi region in territory now organized as Minnesota and Wisconsin. War parties consisting of Cree, armed with iron weapons and seeking beaver, began pressing the Sioux from the north, pushing them westward onto the Great Plains throughout the mid- to late-17th century. In the early 18th century, Lakota obtained horses through trade with the Cheyenne along the Missouri River—animals they called šuŋkawakaŋ ("dog of power/mystery/wonder")—and began their transformation into a horse-mounted buffalo hunting culture. Both Lakota and Cheyenne tradition concur on this point of transmission; the Cheyenne had themselves only recently become mounted, having acquired horses by 1766 and moved into the vicinity of the Black Hills around 1790, where further acquisition allowed them to abandon agriculture for full-time bison hunting. Within a few generations the Lakota, the Cheyenne, and most other peoples of the region had adopted a common seasonal rhythm—dispersed band life through spring and autumn, sheltered winter camps, and a great summer gathering for ceremony and communal hunt, their tipi circles forming what the Lakota called the sacred hoop of the nation.

In 1660, French explorers estimated the total Sioux population (Lakota, Santee, Yankton, and Yanktonai) at 28,000. In 1805, the Lakota population was estimated at 8,500; in 1881 it reached 16,110. They were one of the few Native nations to increase in population during the 19th century. In 2010, the Lakota population exceeded 170,000, of whom about 2,000 still spoke Lakȟótiyapi.

After 1720, the Lakota branch of the Seven Council Fires split into two major groups: the Saône, who moved to the Lake Traverse area, and the Oglála-Sičháŋǧu, who occupied the James River valley. By about 1750 the Saône had moved to the east bank of the Missouri River, followed ten years later by the Oglála and Brulé. The large Arikara, Mandan, and Hidatsa villages had long prevented the Lakota from crossing the Missouri River.

The smallpox epidemic that began in 1781—originating in Mexico City in 1779 and carried northward through trade networks—devastated the Missouri Valley villagers. Arikaras lost more than three-fourths of their people, abandoning all but seven of their thirty-two villages; Mandan villages were reduced from eight to two. The Lakota crossed the river into the short-grass prairies of the High Plains. Under Lakota pressure, the Cheyenne moved west to the Powder River Country. The Lakota eventually made the Black Hills their home and a central component of their existence.

=== Preliminary intercultural relations ===
Before the treaty era imposed its framework of cession and capitulation, the Lakota—like other tribes—engaged neighboring Indigenous nations and successive waves of French, British, and American traders through channels of negotiation, gift exchange, and ritualized alliance-making (if not kinship). These negotiations were deployed with strategic precision, and the associated trade networks were calibrated to maximize access to horses and firearms alike, while Lakota diplomacy was sophisticated enough to reshape their internal political geography as much as it resulted from outside interactions. What emerged was neither passive accommodation nor unilateral disruption but a pattern of selective adoption—new economic networks grafted onto existing structures of oyáte sovereignty—that would define Lakota relations with the wašíču (whites) well into the treaty period itself.

== Treaties and conflicts ==
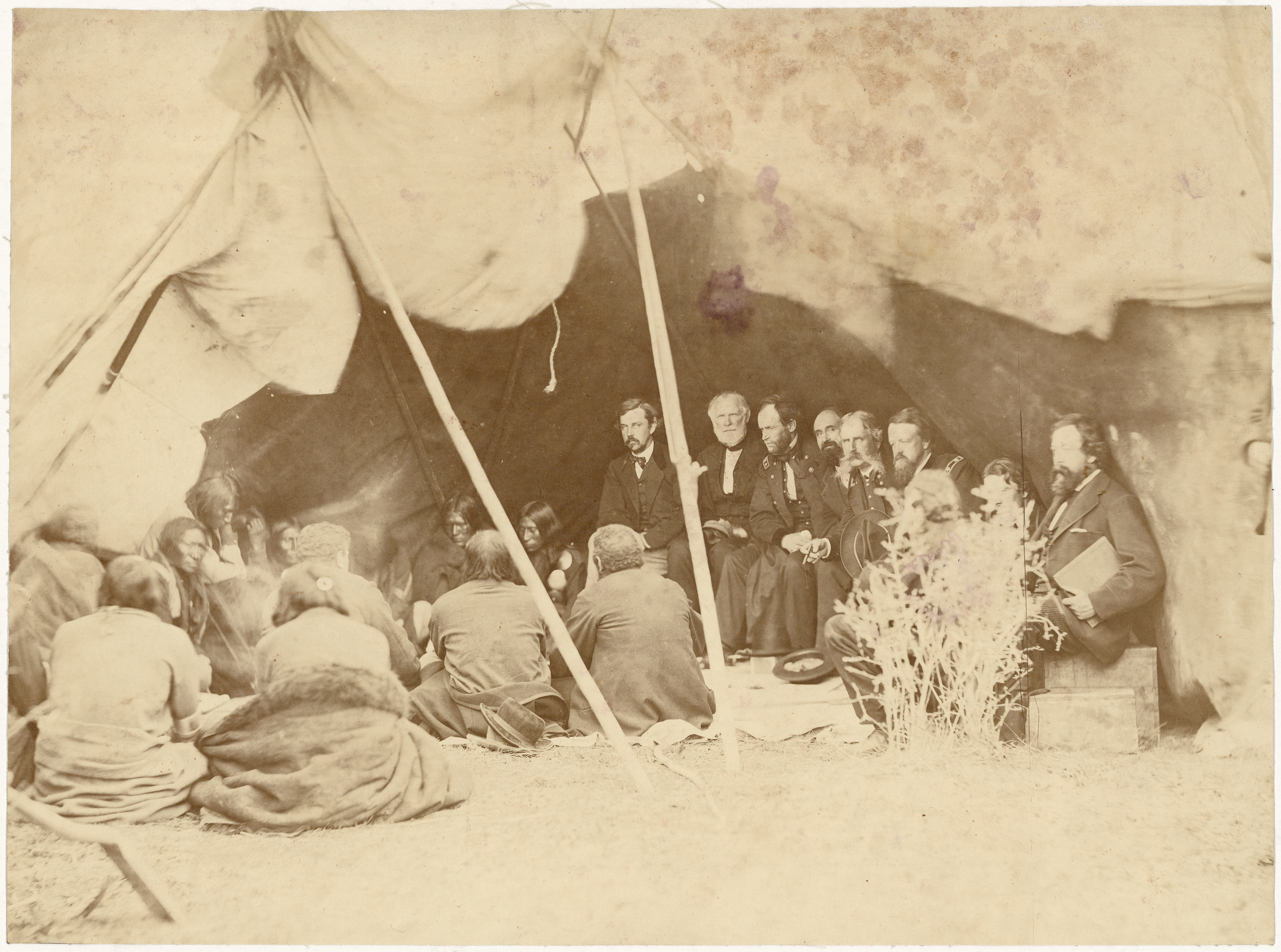
Native peace commissioners in council with the Northern Cheyenne and Northern Arapaho, Fort Laramie, Wyoming, 1868

Initial contact between the Lakota peoples and the United States—at least in terms of individuals officially representing the government under a commission from President Thomas Jefferson—came in September 1804, when the Lewis and Clark Expedition entered Sicangu territory near the mouth of the Bad River. A council originally intended as a routine display of American authority and diplomacy that included gift-giving, a military parade, and a taste of whiskey for the assembled chiefs, quickly soured when William Clark attempted to depart with the Sicangu leaders Black Buffalo and Medicine Bull still aboard the keelboat. Warriors seized the bow cable of the accompanying pirogue and refused to let it go, and the war leader declared that the Americans would not be permitted to advance further upriver without additional gifts. Clark drew his sword, Lewis ordered the expedition's swivel gun and blunderbusses loaded, and Sicangu warriors strung their bows and leveled their weapons; for several tense minutes, the entire expedition stood on the brink of an armed clash that, had it erupted, might well have ended the discovery mission on the spot and delayed American expansion into the interior for years. The standoff dissolved when Black Buffalo released the cable and invited the Americans' boats to continue upriver under Sicangu escort—a resolution that established, from the outset, the terms on which the Lakota would deal with the United States: as the dominant power of the region, granting passage on their own terms rather than submitting to it.

Some Lakota bands became the first Indigenous allies of the U.S. Army—led by Col. Henry Leavenworth—in an intertribal war west of the Missouri during the Arikara War of 1823, an effort during which the Lakota were unimpressed by the American soldier's battlefield performance. The Northern Lakota, convinced that the American soldiers were weak, hardened their preference for British trade and set the northern and southern oyáte on divergent courses before the expedition even departed Fort Leavenworth for its 1825 treaty circuit. The American Horse ledger's account of the Oglála deliberations preceding the council offers an uncommonly direct view of Lakota governance in action: a thiyóthipi (council lodge) convened, elder headmen presided, wakíčhuŋza (deciders) served as heralds, and akíčhita societies enforced order—structures that almost certainly predated 1825 by a considerable margin. The deliberations themselves were fractious; fierce opposition to any treaty engagement with the wašíču was overcome only through the forceful intervention of Bull Bear (Matȟó Tȟatȟáŋka), whose pressure carried the Oglála toward the council table—the division between accommodation and resistance that would fracture Lakota policy toward the United States across the entire nineteenth century already fully legible by the summer of 1825.

Still, the first two decades of the nineteenth century passed without a single recorded killing between Lakota and whites; the winter counts instead document new trading posts, expanding commerce, and—for the Oglála and Sičháŋğu—a strategic preference for American trade over British, a division that already set the northern and southern oyáte at cross-purposes. The 1825 Atkinson-O'Fallon expedition secured the first formal treaty between the United States and the Lakota of the Plains, though most winter counts ignored it entirely in favor of recording that year's Missouri River flood—a hierarchy of significance that accurately reflected the treaty's negligible practical effect on Lakota life. The peace held until the Oregon Trail fractured it: emigrant cattle consumed the prairie grasses upon which the buffalo subsisted, bovine disease decimated the herds, and the great herd that had sustained Lakota prosperity began its irreversible division into northern and southern remnants. The Oglála and Sičháŋğu documented this crisis in January 1846 via letter to the President of the United States, invoking the custom of iglúwašte (reciprocity) and asserting themselves not as supplicants but as equal negotiating partners demanding compensation under the terms of the 1825 treaty itself.

Intertribal warfare remained a fact of indigenous life on the plains and the growing influence and expansion of the Lakota continued to challenge the Mandan, Crow, Pawnee, and Arikara well into the 1840s. Perhaps the only exception to the ongoing intertribal warfare for the Lakota was the treaty they made with the Cheyenne between 1840 and 1841. In 1843, southern Lakota attacked the Pawnee village of Chief Blue Coat near the Loup River, killing many and burning half the earth lodges. (Note: Roughly 40 years later, the next major Lakota blow to the Pawnee occurred in 1873 at Massacre Canyon, during which a large Lakota war party attacked a Pawnee hunting band in southwestern Nebraska, killing as many as 100 to 150 Pawnee men, women, and children in what became the last major inter-tribal battle on the Great Plains.)

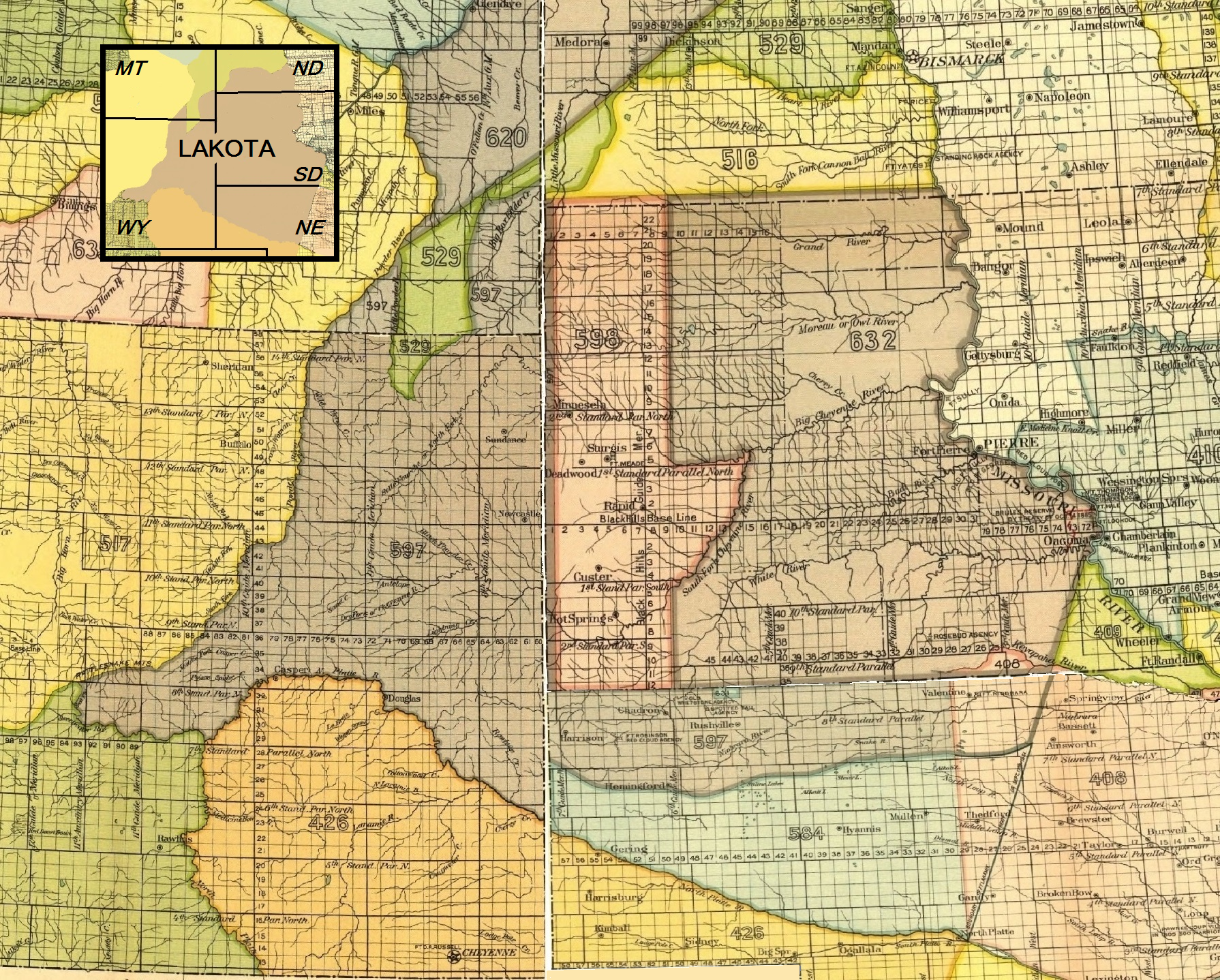
The 1851 Lakota treaty territory

The U.S. Army constructed Fort Laramie without permission on Lakota and Arapaho land, and in 1851 the U.S. government convened a massive multi-tribal council at Horse Creek near the fort to negotiate what became known as the Fort Laramie Treaty. The resulting document—signed by Sicangu and Two Kettle headmen including Mato Oyuhi—granted the Lakota an annuity in exchange for allowing roads and military posts along the Platte, and recognized Lakota title to nearly 100,000 square miles north of the North Platte, the largest Native domain the United States had yet ratified. But the two sides understood the proceedings in fundamentally different terms: American agents believed they had secured legal sovereignty over the West through a cartographic instrument, while the Lakota—who had spent more than two weeks in council, exhausting the grass for miles around—remembered the treaty chiefly for the "Great Distribution" of goods that followed, and considered its territorial provisions largely irrelevant against their own right to use whatever land and resources their hunts required. Indeed, several Lakota winter counts for 1851 ignored the American treaty altogether, recording instead a separate peace concluded with the Crow—negotiated privately, without American mediation, and reflecting the geopolitics that actually mattered to the Lakota.

The following year, General William S. Harney—summoned from Paris specifically to "whip" the Lakota—led some six hundred soldiers up the Platte and on September 2, 1855, attacked a village of Sicangu, Oglala, Miniconjou, and Cheyenne camped along Blue Water Creek near Ash Hollow, Nebraska. Despite a parley in which Sicangu leader Little Thunder—who had no part in the Grattan affair—pleaded for peace and asked only time to remove the women and children, Harney's infantry advanced while his dragoons encircled the village from the rear; trapped in a ravine, the Lakota and Cheyenne were cut down by long-range rifle fire, with at least 86 killed and 70 women and children taken captive—the Lakota's worst defeat in more than a century. Harney pushed further into Lakota territory and occupied Fort Pierre in South Dakota. In the process, General Harvey captured several chiefs' families, who he held hostage, extracting a treaty so coercive that Lakota winter counts remembered him simply as "The Butcher" and "Woman Killer." His invasion of the Sioux homeland forced the tribesmen to move away from places where forts, soldiers, or roads were found and the subsequent military preoccupation with the U.S. Civil War resulted in a 10-year period of "relative peace."

The Black Hills were sacred to the Lakota, who objected to mining. Between 1866 and 1868, the U.S. Army fought the Lakota and their allies along the Bozeman Trail in Red Cloud's War, as the government attempted to buttress the trail through the construction of Fort Fetterman, Fort Reno, Fort Phil Kearny, and Fort C.F. Smith; meanwhile, the Oglala chief Red Cloud led his people to victory, while the 1868 Fort Laramie Treaty "closed the Bozeman Trail" and established the Great Sioux Reservation, covering the western half of present-day South Dakota. The treaty ultimately divided the Lakota—those led by Red Cloud settled on the reservation, while the remaining third, including the bands led by Crazy Horse and Sitting Bull, continued to live independently off the reservation.

Chief Gall. Hunkpapa Teton Sioux.

The northern oyáte had reached the treaty by a separate route and on different terms. After the War Department ordered the Bozeman forts closed, the Jesuit Pierre-Jean De Smet travelled to Sitting Bull's camp in the Powder Valley as a peace envoy, where a council attended by thousands heard Four Horns and Black Moon set out the northern grievances—that the Americans were lacing the country with roads and killing more game than they needed—and reject any cession of land outright; Sitting Bull, while professing readiness to end the war, demanded the abandonment of the forts on the upper Missouri. De Smet secured no agreement in the village itself. He instead escorted a delegation led by the Hunkpapa war leader Chief Gall to Fort Rice, where, following a day of gift distribution, some twenty lesser chiefs signed.

Pressure on the unceded territory in these years also came from the Northern Pacific Railroad. Sitting Bull opened talks at Fort Peck in 1872 and accepted government rations for the first time, which officials in Washington read as a softening; the Montana superintendency's annual report noted in passing that the bands under his control ranged across several hundred miles of the proposed route and intended to resist both the survey and the road itself. In June 1872, surveyors and an escort of more than eleven hundred soldiers, scouts, and herders entered the Yellowstone valley from east and west. Lakotas regarded the valley as part of the unceded territory guaranteed in 1868, and more than a thousand warriors rode to meet the expeditions, fighting the westbound column at Pryor Creek; the eastbound party, reaching the Powder, was confronted by Chief Gall, who faced it alone in war paint with his warriors behind him and told the party to leave. The surveys resumed in 1873 under a far larger expedition that included Custer's Seventh Cavalry, which Lakota forces engaged twice along the Yellowstone in August—the first encounters between Custer and the bands he would meet three years later at the Little Bighorn. What finally stopped the railroad was financial rather than military, as Jay Cooke and Company—which had financed the line—defaulted the following month, triggering the Panic of 1873 and leaving the Northern Pacific insolvent.

In 1874, Lieutenant Colonel George Armstrong Custer led an expedition into the Black Hills and confirmed the presence of gold; prospectors flooded the region in violation of the 1868 treaty, and the government made no effort to remove them. General Philip Sheridan encouraged troops to destroy the buffalo to starve the Lakota into submission.

=== Rosebud, Little Big Horn, and the Black Hills Treaty ===
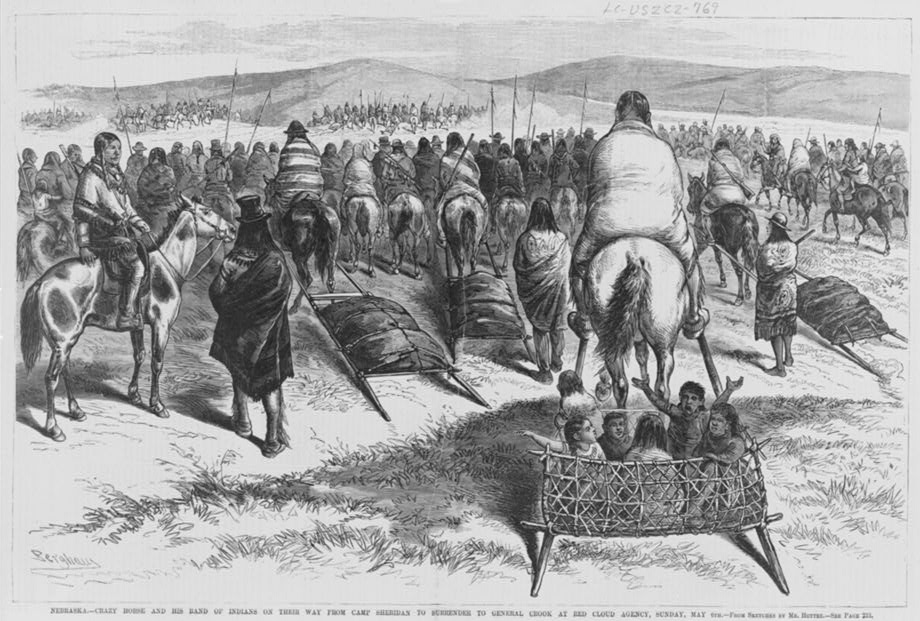
Artist's rendering of Crazy Horse and his band of Oglala on their way from Camp Sheridan to surrender to General Crook at Red Cloud Agency

On 17 June 1876, a united assemblage of Lakota, Arapaho, and Northern Cheyenne forces defeated General George Crook at the Battle of the Rosebud, preventing him from locating their camp; a victory that the late native speaking Lakota teacher, writer, activist, and actor Joseph M. Marshall III—drawing from long-standing oral heritage among the Lakota—claims his people feared at the time, realizing that the "Long Knives" (a term applied to U.S. soldiers in their blue coats, carrying swords and bayonets affixed to their rifles) would ultimately seek revenge despite the tactical success of the indigenous forces. Only a week later, at the Battle of the Little Bighorn, the combined Lakota and Cheyenne forces under Crazy Horse and Sitting Bull defeated Custer—the greatest Indian military victory of the Plains wars, and the last. Custer's annihilation at the Little Bighorn on June 25, 1876—twelve officers, 247 soldiers, and three Arikara scouts lost, per Sherman's report—sent shockwaves through the American military establishment and its political class alike; yet the search for explanation revealed, above all, how thoroughly the army had miscalculated its enemy. General Terry's orders to Custer had been framed around preventing flight, not repelling a disciplined defense—a directive that exposed the command's foundational assumption that the Lakota and Cheyenne would scatter rather than fight. Whether Custer underestimated the camp's scale or simply could not afford, under his orders, to withdraw, remains contested; what is not debated is that the failure of intelligence extended well above him. (Note: Post-battle mythologization began almost immediately. Sitting Bull acquired the improbable legend of a West Point education; Custer migrated from scapegoat to martyr; and Indian Agent James McLaughlin, operating with particular animus through the 1880s, systematically recast Sitting Bull—formerly celebrated as a tactician—as a coward who had fled the field.) The victory, for whatever its worth to the indigenous tribesmen, carried its own burden: Sitting Bull had warned that the desecration of his vision—the prohibition against taking spoils from the fallen, left unheeded—would later consign the Lakota to permanent dependence on the wašíču; a prophecy confirmed in the subsequent decades. Congress placed the northern reservations under direct army control, and a winter campaign broke the remaining resistance; Crazy Horse surrendered at Fort Robinson, Nebraska, on May 6, 1877, and was killed by a soldier later that year while resisting arrest. Sitting Bull, who had fled to Canada, surrendered at Fort Buford on July 19, 1881.

In 1877, some Lakota bands signed a treaty ceding the Black Hills to the United States; the legitimacy of this treaty remains disputed. By 1890 a drought had collapsed that year's harvest across the reservations, deepening Lakota dependence on already-inadequate federal rations—conditions of starvation and despair into which the Ghost Dance movement, promising the resurrection of the old world and the disappearance of white settlers, spread rapidly. The newly arrived Pine Ridge agent, Daniel F. Royer, read the dance as preparation for war rather than as the messianic revival it was, and his alarmed dispatches—invoking the 1862 Minnesota uprising as precedent—helped bring federal troops into the region in November; the press corps that traveled with them, finding no uprising to report, manufactured one, and the resulting rumors, circulating back to literate Lakota on the reservations, hardened the divide the newspapers themselves had drawn between "hostile" and "friendly" bands.

==== Wounded Knee Massacre ====
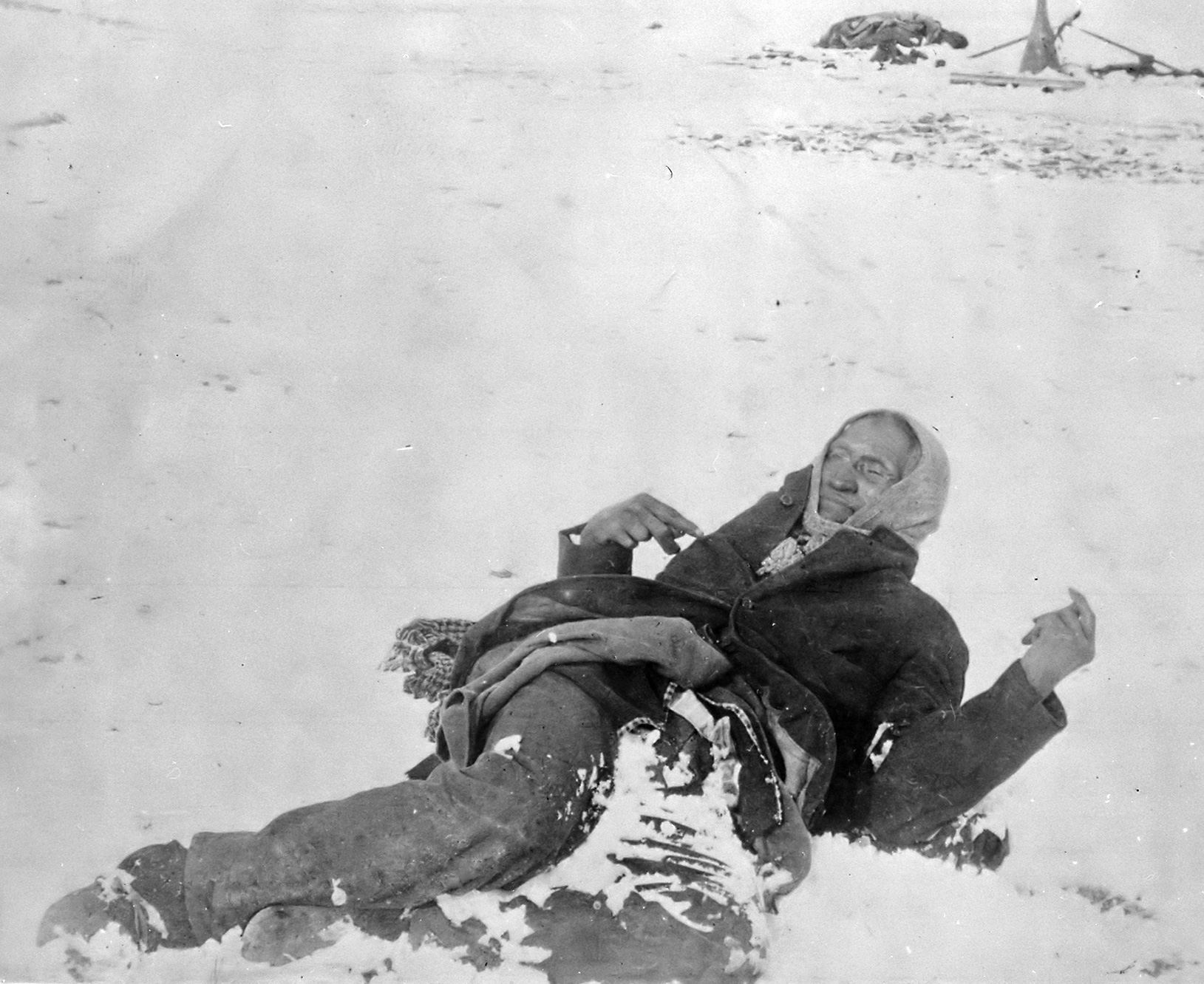
Miniconjou-Lakota-Sioux-Chief Spotted Elk lies dead after the massacre of Wounded Knee, 1890

On December 15, 1890, Sitting Bull was shot and killed at Standing Rock by Indian police sent to arrest him. For many Lakota, his death represented a warning of what awaited Ghost Dancers; at Cheyenne River, the already-anxious Miniconjous under Spotted Elk (Big Foot) were persuaded by a local squatter, John Dunn—sent by the army to keep them in place—that the military instead intended to deport their men to an island in the Atlantic, and on his advice they fled toward Pine Ridge on the night of December 23, Big Foot himself gravely ill with pneumonia. The army, having misidentified the ailing Spotted Elk as the successor to Sitting Bull and a key threat, intercepted the band five days later and ordered it escorted to Wounded Knee Creek; on December 29, after a struggle broke out during a weapons search, the 7th Cavalry opened fire, and Hotchkiss guns positioned on the surrounding hills poured shells into the camp. At least 270 Lakota died, roughly 170 of them women and children; twenty U.S. soldiers were subsequently awarded the Congressional Medal of Honor for their roles in the massacre. The sixteen photographs taken during the January 3 burial of 146 Lakota in a single mass grave, circulated alongside newspaper accounts of the killing, fixed Wounded Knee in the public imagination as the enduring symbol of the violence underlying U.S. Indian policy.

== Government ==
=== United States ===
The Lakota tribes are federally recognized and maintain government‑to‑government relations with the United States, primarily through the Bureau of Indian Affairs (BIA) within the Department of the Interior. Several Lakota tribal nations—located in the Dakotas, Minnesota, and Nebraska—elect officials to tribal councils that govern their reservations and communities.

As semi‑autonomous political entities, federally recognized tribes exercise inherent powers of self‑government that are not subject to most state laws. Under the Indian Gaming Regulatory Act of 1988 (IGRA), tribes may operate Indian gaming on their lands as a means of promoting economic development, self‑sufficiency, and strong tribal governments. Tribal–federal and tribal–state relationships over jurisdiction, land status, and gaming compacts are frequently negotiated and sometimes contested.

Most Lakota tribal members are also citizens of the United States under the Indian Citizenship Act of 1924 and may vote in local, state, and federal elections. They are represented at the state and national levels through the political districts of their respective states and Congressional districts. Each Lakota tribe fixes its own membership criteria and electoral qualifications under a constitution that, in many instances, derives from the Indian Reorganization Act of 1934—the Oglala, for example, ratified theirs in 1935 under section 16 of the Act, confining the franchise to members resident on the reservation for a year. All five are federally recognized by virtue of a government-to-government relationship with the United States, as the Bureau of Indian Affairs’ list of recognized entities attests.Most Lakota governments follow a multi‑member tribal council model, with a chairman or president elected at-large by tribal voters.

=== Canada ===
Nine bands of Dakota and Lakota—Birdtail Sioux, Canupawakpa, Dakota Plains Wahpeton, Dakota Tipi, Sioux Valley, Standing Buffalo, Wahpeton, Whitecap, and Wood Mountain—reside in Manitoba and Saskatchewan, numbering roughly 6,000 members in total; excluded from the numbered treaties of the 1870s on the premise that their ancestors had arrived as refugees from the United States following the Dakota War of 1862 and the subsequent Sioux wars rather than as Aboriginal peoples of Canada, the bands were left with smaller reserves, no access to the treaty land entitlement and resource-revenue arrangements afforded their neighbors, and—until 2024—no recognition as "Aboriginal peoples of Canada" under Section 35 of the Constitution.

Ottawa formally rejected the bands' claim to Aboriginal title in 2007, and the following year the nine bands unanimously declined a one-time $60.3 million payment offered in exchange for renouncing any further claim to Aboriginal or treaty rights—a refusal that, like the Sioux Nation's rejection of the Black Hills settlement decades earlier, treated the offer as an attempted purchase of rights Canada had never acknowledged in the first place. That history was formally addressed on July 15, 2024, when Canada apologized to the nine Dakota and Lakota First Nations, affirmed their constitutional status as Aboriginal peoples, and committed to negotiating modern treaties and self-government arrangements; the Sioux Valley Dakota Nation's self-government agreement had already taken effect in 2014, and Whitecap Dakota Nation concluded its own the year before the broader apology.

=== Independence movement ===
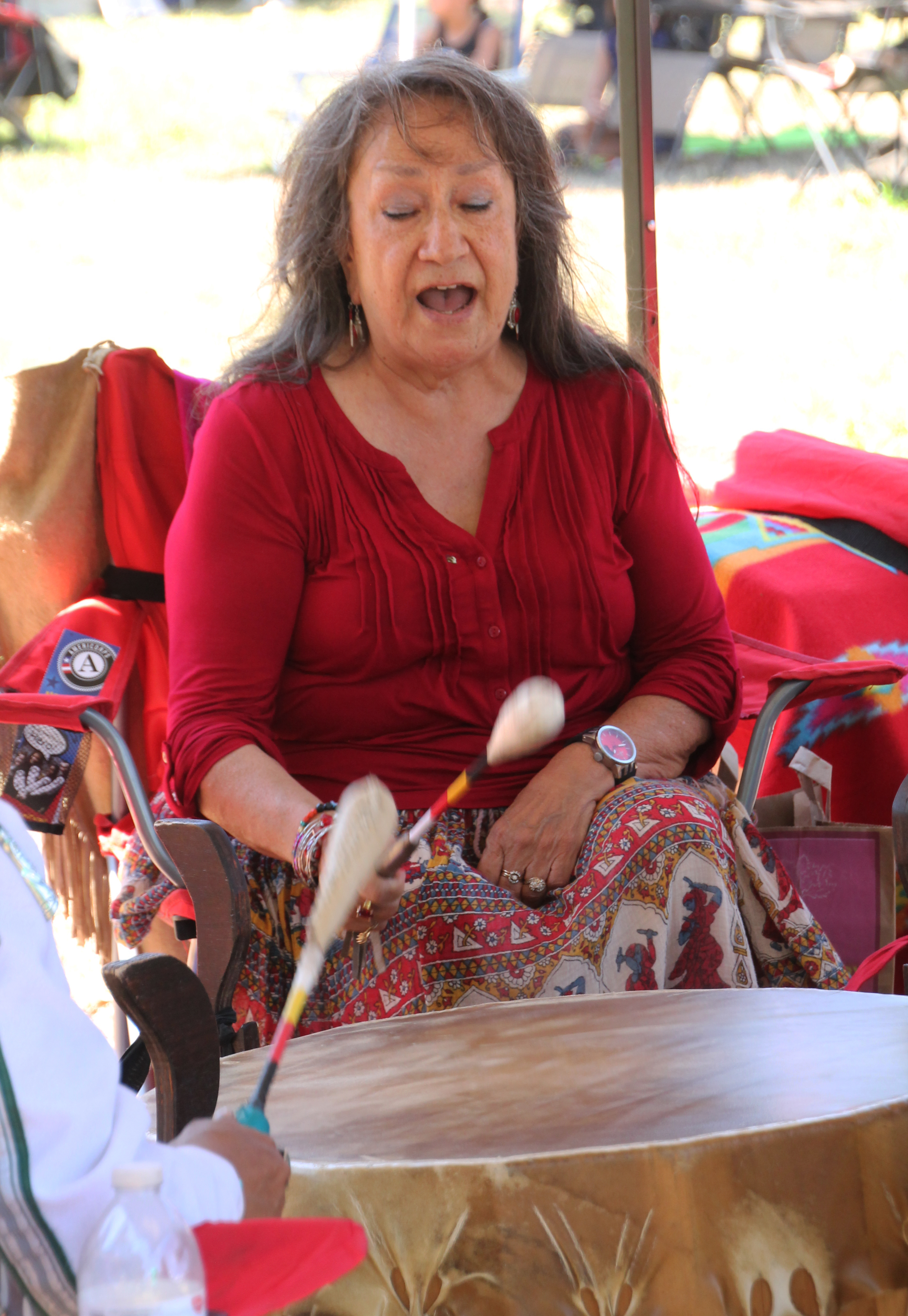
Mildred "Midge" Wagner, a Lakota woman, singing at a pow wow in 2015

The Lakota have participated in occupations, treaty‑rights actions, and sovereignty or independence movements since the rise of Indigenous activism in the mid‑ to late‑20th century. They also filed land claims against the federal government for what they defined as the illegal taking of the Black Hills in the nineteenth century, a position affirmed by the United States Supreme Court in 1980.

In 1980, the Supreme Court ruled in their favor in United States v. Sioux Nation of Indians, awarding US$122 million to eight Sioux tribes as compensation for the Black Hills land seizure. The tribes refused the settlement because accepting it would legally terminate their claim to the Black Hills. The funds remain in a Bureau of Indian Affairs account, accruing interest; by 2011 the total exceeded $1 billion.

In September 2007, the United Nations adopted the Declaration on the Rights of Indigenous Peoples. Canada, the United States, Australia, and New Zealand initially voted against the declaration. Then in December 2007, a small group led by American Indian Movement activist Russell Means, calling itself the Lakota Freedom Delegation, traveled to Washington, D.C., to announce a unilateral withdrawal of the Lakota Sioux from all treaties with the United States. Official Lakota tribal leaders rejected the declaration. Rosebud Sioux tribal chairman Rodney Bordeaux stated: "We do not support what Means and his group are doing...They don't speak for us." Additional commentary from Lakota community members and journalists likewise emphasized that the delegation did not represent any tribal government. No elected tribal governments endorsed the declaration, and several issued statements distancing themselves from the movement.

==== Wind Cave National Park ====
Wind Cave, in the southern Black Hills, is the site of the Lakota emergence story—the place of origin from which the people are said to have first entered the world—and the park built around it, designated in 1903, was the first national park created specifically to protect a cave; it presently sits within the same disputed territory underlying the Sioux Nation land claims. An effort in the mid-1980s to return the park's land to the Lakota failed in the legislative process. A 2016 study of seventeen Lakota interviewees found broad dissatisfaction with the park's interpretation of the site. The complaints levied: Lakota perspectives were felt to be absent, relegated to the past tense, or limited to a single band's viewpoint, cave-tour fees were resented as a charge for access to a homeland rather than an attraction, and recommendations centered on hiring Lakota staff, requiring tribal perspectives on cave tours, and consulting tribes when exhibits are redesigned.

== Ethnonyms ==
The name Sioux derives from a French corruption of the Ojibwe Nadowessiwak, "little snakes." The autonym Lakȟóta—shared in dialectal variant with Dakȟóta and Nakȟóta across the three divisions—carries the meaning "allies," a rendering that supersedes the occasionally suggested gloss of "people." The Teton designation derives from the Lakȟóta thítȟuŋwaŋ, possibly meaning "dwellers on the plains."

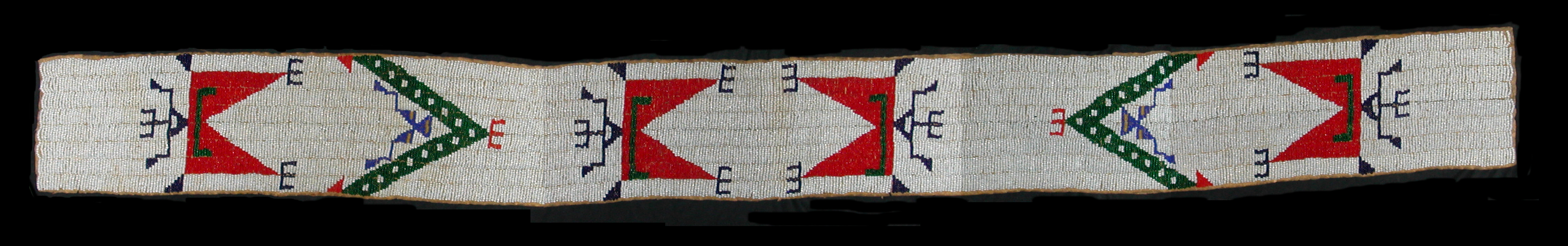
Lakota beaded saddle belt, made c. 1850

Seventeenth- and eighteenth-century French documentation drew no distinction between the Teton and the other western divisions of the Sioux; all three—Santee, Yankton, and Teton—were grouped indiscriminately as "Sioux of the West," set against the "Sioux of the East" on the opposite bank of the Mississippi. The seven Lakȟóta tribes collectively designate themselves the Očhéthi Šakówiŋ, the Seven Council Fires—a term that sometimes extends to the Sioux Nation as a whole rather than the Lakȟóta alone, and which, despite the absence of historical evidence for a unified political entity of that number, functions as a powerful symbol of collective identity for both Lakȟóta and Dakȟóta peoples. (Note: During Ella Deloria's 1930s fieldwork at Pine Ridge, "Dakota" was applied broadly to the Teton division as well, whereas today Lakota and Dakota are sharply distinguished, united only under the wider designation Očhéthi Šakówiŋ, the Seven Council Fires.)

=== Language ===
During the early 2000s, the Lakota language was rendered into several competing orthographies; the one now most widely used, the Standard Lakota Orthography (SLO), forms the foundation for the New Lakota Dictionary with some 43,000 entries and contains a companion Lakota Grammar handbook. Though produced chiefly through the Lakota Language Consortium, SLO has spread beyond it, into curricula at Sitting Bull College, the Oglala Lakota County School District, and Maȟpíya Lúta Owáyawa (formerly Red Cloud School). Linguist Ella Deloria's orthography, devised in the course of the 1930s fieldwork she conducted, anticipated much of SLO and stands as one of its principal antecedents.

== Reservations ==
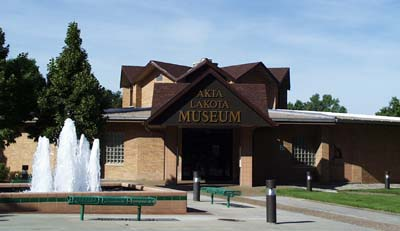
Akta Lakota Museum in Chamberlain, South Dakota

Today, the Lakota are found mostly in the five reservations of western South Dakota:

- Pine Ridge Indian Reservation, home of the Oglála, the most numerous of the Lakota bands.
- Rosebud Indian Reservation, home of the Upper Sičhánǧu or Brulé.
- Lower Brule Indian Reservation, home of the Lower Sičhaŋǧu.
- Cheyenne River Indian Reservation, home of several other of the seven Lakota bands, including the Mnikȟówožu, Itázipčho, Sihásapa, and Oóhenumpa.
- Standing Rock Indian Reservation, home of the Húŋkpapȟa and to people from many other bands. This reservation straddles the border between North and South Dakota.

Additional Lakota reservations recognized by the U.S. government include:

- Santee Indian Reservation, in Nebraska
- Crow Creek Indian Reservation in Central South Dakota
- Yankton Indian Reservation in Central South Dakota
- Flandreau Indian Reservation in Eastern South Dakota
- Lake Traverse Indian Reservation in Northeastern South Dakota and Southeastern North Dakota
- Lower Sioux Indian Reservation in Minnesota
- Upper Sioux Indian Reservation in Minnesota
- Shakopee-Mdewakanton Indian Reservation in Minnesota
- Prairie Island Indian Reservation in Minnesota

Lakota presence beyond the Dakota reservations traces in part to Sitting Bull's flight after the Little Bighorn: by May 1877 he and some four hundred Hunkpapa followers had taken refuge in Saskatchewan, encamped between Wood Mountain and Fort Qu'Appelle—the "Grandmother's Land" of Lakota memory—before crossing back to surrender at Fort Buford in 1881 and, after a period of detention, rejoining the Hunkpapa at Standing Rock two years later. Wood Mountain remains, to this day, one of the nine Dakota and Lakota First Nations recognized in Saskatchewan. The mid-twentieth-century federal relocation program drew Lakota off the reservations on a far larger scale: by the late 1990s an estimated 25,000 Native Americans—mostly Navajo and Lakota—called metropolitan Denver home, while Rapid City and Sioux Falls each held Native populations of 10,000 to 15,000 that were predominantly Lakota.

=== Modern activism about Lakota children ===
The over-representation of Lakota and other Native American children in South Dakota's foster care system has been a persistent site of activism and litigation. National attention first focused on the issue in 2011, when NPR's investigative series "Lost Children, Shattered Families" documented what critics characterized as the systematic removal of Lakota children by the state Department of Social Services (DSS), with Native children constituting more than half of all children then in South Dakota foster care. Lakota activists—among them Madonna Thunder Hawk and Chase Iron Eyes of the Lakota People's Law Project—have alleged that Lakota grandmothers are routinely and illegally denied the right to foster their own grandchildren, and have pressed for the redirection of federal child welfare funding from the state DSS to tribal foster care programs.

The problem has only deepened in the intervening years. A joint investigation by South Dakota Searchlight and the Argus Leader, published in November 2023 under the title "The Lost Children," found that Native American children accounted for nearly 74 percent of all children in South Dakota's foster care system at the close of fiscal year 2023—despite constituting only 13 percent of the state's overall child population; by comparison, white children, who make up 70 percent of the state's child population, accounted for only 21 percent of the foster care population. The disparity has persisted: Native American children made up 72.5 percent of South Dakota's foster care population at the close of fiscal year 2024, and 70 percent at the close of fiscal year 2025.

The legal framework governing Native child placement, the Indian Child Welfare Act of 1978 (ICWA), survived a major constitutional challenge when the U.S. Supreme Court ruled 7–2 in Haaland v. Brackeen, 599 U.S. (2023), that ICWA does not exceed Congress's authority under the Indian Commerce Clause and does not violate the Tenth Amendment's anti-commandeering doctrine. Chase Iron Eyes, then serving as an attorney with the Lakota Law Project, described the decision as a "watershed moment" for tribal sovereignty. Notwithstanding the ruling, advocates and tribal ICWA coordinators have noted that widespread noncompliance with the Act in South Dakota's state courts and child welfare system continues to drive Native children into non-Native placements.

== See also ==
- Lakota mythology
- List of Lakota people
- Native American tribes in Nebraska

== Bibliography ==
- Andersson, Rani-Henrik; Posthumus, David C. (2022). Lakhóta: An Indigenous History. Norman, OK: University of Oklahoma Press. ISBN 978-0-80619-075-4.
- Barrett, Carole A. (2004a). "Sioux Wars". In Wishart, David J. (ed.). Encyclopedia of the Great Plains Indians. Lincoln: University of Nebraska Press. pp. 187–188. ISBN 978-0-80329-862-0.
- Barrett, Carole A. (2004b). "Sitting Bull". In Wishart, David J. (ed.). Encyclopedia of the Great Plains Indians. Lincoln: University of Nebraska Press. pp. 188–189. ISBN 978-0-80329-862-0.
- Blakeslee, Donald J. (1981). "The Origin and Spread of the Calumet Ceremony". American Antiquity. 46 (4): 759–768. doi:10.2307/280104. JSTOR 280104.
- Buecker, Thomas R. (1995). ""Can You Send Us Immediate Relief?": Army Expeditions to the Northern Black Hills, 1876–1878". South Dakota History. 25 (2). South Dakota State Historical Society: 95–115. ISSN 0361-8676.
- Bureau of Indian Affairs. "Cheyenne River Agency". BIA.gov. Washington, DC.
- Bureau of Indian Affairs. "Lower Brule Agency". BIA.gov. Washington, DC.
- Bureau of Indian Affairs. "Pine Ridge Agency". BIA.gov. Washington, DC.
- Bureau of Indian Affairs. "Rosebud Agency". BIA.gov. Washington, DC.
- Bureau of Indian Affairs. "Standing Rock Agency". BIA.gov. Washington, DC.
- Bureau of Indian Affairs (January 30, 2026). "Indian Entities Recognized by and Eligible To Receive Services From the United States Bureau of Indian Affairs" (PDF). Federal Register. 91 (20): 4102–4106. FR Doc. 2026-01899.
- Carney, Bill (2015). "The Policies of War and Peace". In B.D. Lookingbill (ed.). A Companion to Custer and the Little Bighorn Campaign. Wiley-Blackwell. pp. 111–129. ISBN 978-1-44435-109-5.
- Carter, John E. (2004). "Wounded Knee Massacre". In Wishart, David J. (ed.). Encyclopedia of the Great Plains Indians. Lincoln: University of Nebraska Press. pp. 222–224. ISBN 978-0-80329-862-0.
- "Ottawa rejects claims by Dakota, Lakota First Nations". CBC News. August 1, 2007.
- "Canada Votes 'No' as UN Native Rights Declaration passes". CBC News. 2007b.
- "Canada to formally apologize to 9 Dakota, Lakota Nations for historic designation as refugees". CBC News. July 14, 2024.
- CKOM (July 15, 2024). "Canada to apologize after labelling Dakota and Lakota as refugees". 650 CKOM.
- Crown-Indigenous Relations and Northern Affairs Canada (July 15, 2024). "Canada apologizes to nine Dakota-Lakota First Nations communities for longstanding injustice". Government of Canada.
- CRS (2023). Tribal Sovereignty and Governance (Report). Congressional Research Service.
- Cutlip, Kimbra (2018). "In 1868, Two Nations Made a Treaty. The U.S. Broke It". Smithsonian Magazine.
- Dakota News Now (June 15, 2023). "South Dakota tribes, allies praise ICWA ruling, a 'watershed moment'". Dakota News Now.
- DeMallie, Raymond J. (2001a). "Sioux until 1850". In DeMallie, Raymond J. (ed.). Handbook of North American Indians: Plains. Vol. 13, Part 2. Washington, D.C.: Smithsonian Institution. pp. 718–760. ISBN 0-16-050400-7.
- DeMallie, Raymond J. (2001b). "Teton". In DeMallie, Raymond J. (ed.). Handbook of North American Indians: Plains. Vol. 13, Part 2. Washington, D.C.: Smithsonian Institution. pp. 794–820. ISBN 0-16-050400-7.
- Federal Register (2024). "Indian Entities Recognized by and Eligible To Receive Services From the United States Bureau of Indian Affairs". Federal Register.
- Firethunder, Alex (2025). "Lakota Voices from the Archives: The Fire Thunder Narratives Recorded by Ella C. Deloria". South Dakota History. 55 (4): 259–342. ISSN 0361-8676.
- Fixico, Donald L. (2004). "Urban Communities". In Wishart, David J. (ed.). Encyclopedia of the Great Plains. Lincoln: University of Nebraska Press. pp. 212–213.
- Fletcher, Matthew L. M. (2011). American Indian Tribal Law. Aspen Elective Series. Austin: Aspen Publishers. ISBN 978-0-73559-975-8.
- Gibbon, Guy (2003). The Sioux: The Dakota and Lakota Nations. Malden, MA: Blackwell Publishing. ISBN 1-55786-566-3.
- Gwozdz, Josh (July 15, 2024). "Canada apologizes to nine First Nations after labelling Dakota and Lakota as refugees". Global News.
- Hämäläinen, Pekka (2019). Lakota America: A New History of Indigenous Power. New Haven: Yale University Press. ISBN 978-0-30021-595-3.
- Hanson, Stephen Cosby (1980). "Special Recent Development: United States v. Sioux Nation: Political Questions, Moral Imperative, and the National Honor". American Indian Law Review. 8 (2): 459–484. doi:10.2307/20068172. JSTOR 20068172.
- Huber, Makenzie; Todd, Annie (November 6, 2023). "The Lost Children: Over-representation of Native American children in the SD foster care system". South Dakota Searchlight.
- Huber, Makenzie (December 16, 2025). "70% of children in South Dakota foster care are Native American, state says". South Dakota Searchlight.
- Jensen, Richard E. (1994). "The Pawnee Mission, 1834–1846". Nebraska History. 75 (4): 301–310.
- Kappler, Charles J. (1904). Indian Affairs: Laws and Treaties. Vol. 2. Washington.
- Kracht, Benjamin R. (2004). "Kiowas". In Wishart, David J. (ed.). Encyclopedia of the Great Plains. University of Nebraska–Lincoln, Center for Great Plains Studies.
- LaDuke, Winona (1999). All Our Relations: Native Struggles for Land and Life. Cambridge, MA: South End Press. ISBN 978-0-89608-599-2.
- Liberty, Margot (2008). "Cheyenne Primacy: The Tribes' Perspective".
- Marshall, Joseph M. III (2005). The Journey of Crazy Horse: A Lakota History. New York: Penguin. ISBN 978-0-50005-178-8.
- Meyer, Roy W. (1977). The Village Indians of the Upper Missouri: The Mandans, Hidatsas, and Arikaras. Lincoln and London.
- Parks, Douglas R.; & Rankin, Robert L. (2001). "The Siouan Languages". In R. J. DeMallie (Ed.), Handbook of North American Indians: Plains (Vol. 13, Part 1, pp. 94–114). W. C. Sturtevant (Gen. Ed.). Washington, D.C.: Smithsonian Institution. ISBN 978-0-16-050400-6.
- Murray, Mariel J.; Donley, Madeline W.; Scherer, Dana A. (2025). "Indian Gaming Regulatory Act: Gaming on "Indian Lands"". Congressional Research Service.
- National Archives (1924). "Indian Citizenship Act of 1924". National Archives.
- Nichols, Roger L. (1963). "General Henry Atkinson's Report of the Yellowstone Expedition of 1825" (PDF). Nebraska History. 44: 65–82.
- NPR (October 25, 2011). "Native Foster Care: Lost Children, Shattered Families". NPR.
- Ostler, Jeffrey (2011). The Lakota and the Black Hills: The Struggle for Sacred Ground. Cambridge, MA: Harvard University Press. ISBN 978-0-14311-920-3.
- Pritzker, Barry (2000). Native American Encyclopedia. Oxford University Press. ISBN 978-0-19-513877-1.
- Riley, Paul D. (1973). "The Battle of Massacre Canyon". Nebraska History. 54 (2): 221–249.
- Sajna, Mike (2000). Crazy Horse: The Life Behind the Legend. New York: John Wiley & Sons. ISBN 978-0-78582-036-9.
- Smaldone, Dave; Rossi, Adam (2019). "Contested Terrain: Attitudes of Lakota People Towards Interpretation at Wind Cave National Park". Journal of Interpretation Research. 24 (1): 99–106. doi:10.1177/109258721902400108. ISSN 1092-5872.
- Smithsonian (2012). "Lakota Winter Counts". Smithsonian National Museum of Natural History - YouTube video.
- Streshinsky, Maria (March 2011). "Saying No to $1 Billion". The Atlantic.
- Toensing, Gale Courey (January 4, 2008). "Withdrawal from US Treaties Enjoys Little Support from Tribal Leaders". Indian Country Today.
- U.S. Supreme Court (1980). "United States v. Sioux Nation of Indians". Justia. p. 371.
- U.S. Supreme Court (2023). "Haaland v. Brackeen" (PDF). supremecourt.gov.
- World Data (2024). "Lakota Tribe". TheWorldData.com.
- Wilson, James (1999). The Earth Shall Weep: A History of Native America. New York: Atlantic Monthly Press. ISBN 0-87113-730-5.
- Wishart, David J., ed. (2004). Encyclopedia of the Great Plains Indians. Lincoln: University of Nebraska Press. ISBN 978-0-80329-862-0.
