= Powder River Battles (1865) =

Series of battles

- Part of the Powder River Expedition, Sioux Wars
Date	September 1–15, 1865
Location	Powder River, Montana Territory and Dakota Territory, present-day Custer and Powder River counties, Montana and northeastern Wyoming
Result	Strategic Native American victory

Belligerents
United States	Lakota Sioux; Cheyenne; Arapaho

Commanders and leaders
(United States) Nelson D. Cole (United States) Samuel Walker	Sitting Bull; Roman Nose

Strength
2,000 soldiers and civilians	2,000–4,000 warriors

Casualties and losses
17 killed, 13 wounded	7+ killed, 11+ wounded

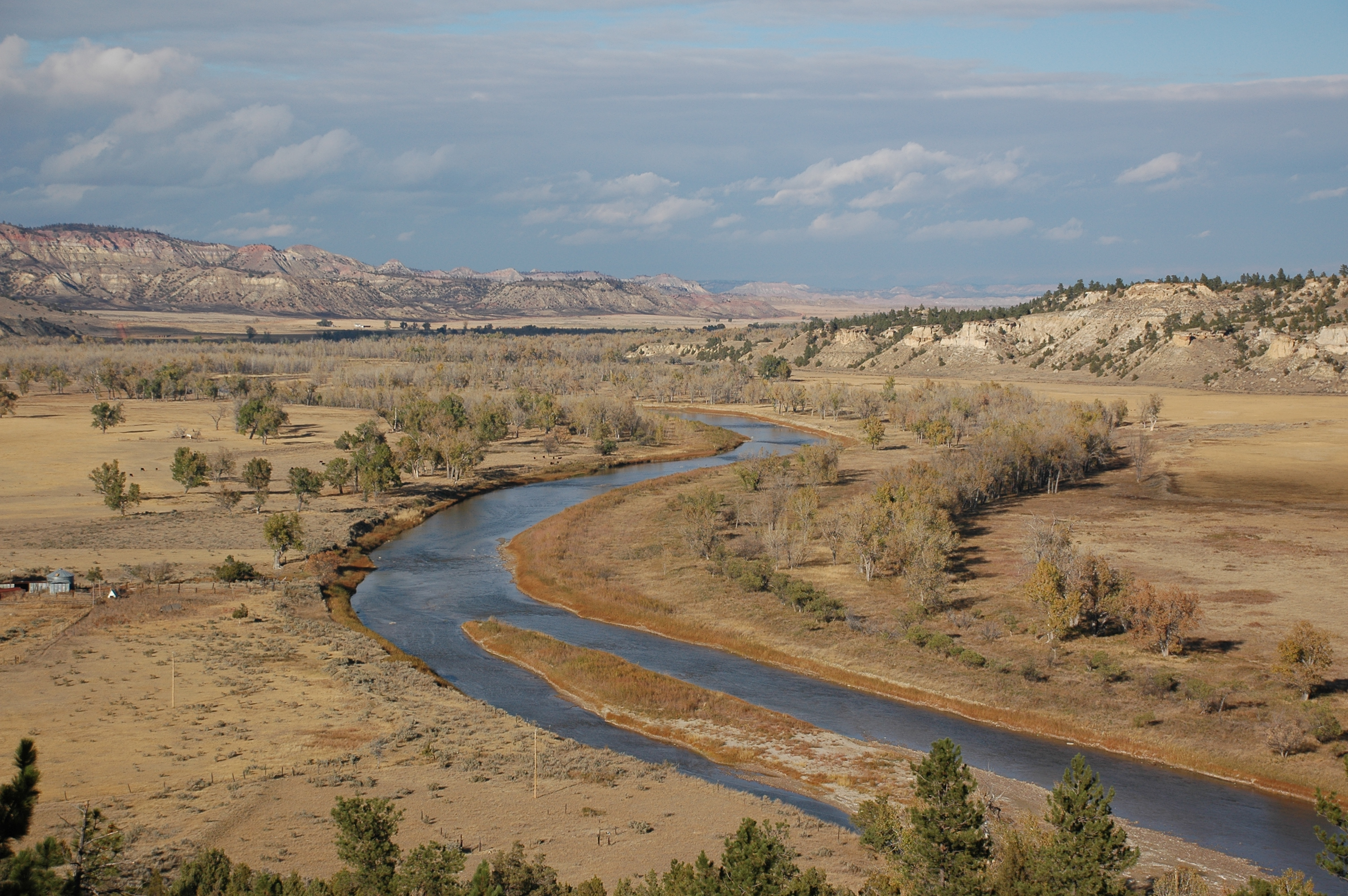
Powder River today

The Powder River Battles were a series of battles and skirmishes fought between September 1–15, 1865 by United States soldiers and civilians against Sioux, Cheyenne, and Arapaho warriors. The fighting occurred along the Powder River in Montana Territory and Dakota Territory, in present-day Custer and Powder River counties, Montana and northeastern Wyoming.

== Background ==
Major General Grenville M. Dodge assumed command of the Department of the Missouri in 1865. Dodge ordered a punitive campaign to suppress the Cheyenne, Sioux, and Arapaho Indians who had been raiding overland mail routes, wagon trains, and military posts along the Oregon and Overland trails. He gave tactical command of the eastern division of the Powder River Expedition, as it was called, to Colonel Nelson D. Cole, and command of the middle division to Lieutenant Colonel Samuel Walker. A third western column was commanded by Brigadier General Patrick E. Connor.

Colonel Cole left Omaha, Nebraska on July 1, 1865 with over 1,400 Missourians and 140 wagon-loads of supplies. His column followed the Loup River upstream and then marched overland to Bear Butte in the Black Hills, arriving there on August 13, 1865. Cole's command, during the 560 miles (900 km) of traveling, suffered from thirst, diminishing supplies, and near mutinies. Lieutenant Colonel Samuel Walker and his 600 Kansas cavalrymen left Fort Laramie, Dakota Territory on August 5, 1865, and met up with Cole's expedition on August 19, 1865 near the Black Hills. He had likewise suffered from shortages of water, and had lost several soldiers of his 16th Kansas Cavalry from bad water. The two columns marched separately, but remained in contact as they moved west to the Powder River in Montana Territory, reaching it on August 29. By this time, some of the men were barefoot and many of the horses and mules were growing weak.

== September 1 ==
On the morning of Friday, September 1, 1865, the over 1,400 soldiers and civilians of Colonel Cole's column were encamped along the Powder River near the mouth of what is now called Alkali Creek in present-day Custer County, Montana. Walker's command was bivouacked several miles to the south. In the early morning, over 300 Hunkpapa, Sans Arc, and Miniconjou Lakota Sioux warriors led by Sitting Bull attacked the eastern columns' horse herd. The first soldiers to respond was a small detachment of Battery K, 2nd Missouri Light Artillery. Shortly after they left their camp, Warriors ambushed the small party, and in the ensuing fight, six of the soldiers became casualties, with three killed, one mortally wounded, and two wounded. Later that night, two soldiers in a hunting party were killed. Four Sioux warriors were killed and at least four were wounded.

== September 2–7 ==
The next day, Saturday, September 2, 1865, there were at least three small skirmishes with warriors. In the first, at least one warrior was killed. In the second, no casualties were reported. In the third, later in the day, two soldiers were killed, while returning to camp after a hunting trip. In desperate need of supplies, Colonel Cole and Walker decided to follow the Powder River north, to search for Brigadier General Patrick E. Connor's column and wagon train. The two expeditions continued north to the mouth of Mizpah Creek in present-day Custer County, Montana. There, the two commanders decided to turn back and retrace their steps south up the Powder River after receiving reports that the river had dried up downstream. Indians attacked again on September 4, 5, and 7, and continued to harass Cole's and Walker's men as the soldiers moved south up the Powder River.

== September 8 ==
On Friday, September 8, 1865, Colonel Cole's and Lieutenant Colonel Walker's column's were marching south up the Powder River in present-day Powder River County, Montana. Unbeknownst to them, a village of over 3,000 Cheyenne, Sioux, and Arapaho, containing approximately 1000 lodges was camped less than ten miles away. Learning of the soldiers' approach, the warriors, not wanting their village to be attacked, struck the army column first. The soldiers' vanguard of about 25 men from the 16th Kansas Volunteer Cavalry under Second Lieutenant Charles Ballance of Company F was marching about a quarter of a mile ahead of the main column. The warriors attacked Ballance's small party, and Private William P. Long of Company E was killed and Corporal John Price of Company G was wounded. Lieutenant Ballance sent one of his men back to Walker, who was now viewing the action unfold from a butte a mile to the rear. Walker sent a courier back to inform Colonel Cole of the attack. At the time, Cole was about two miles behind Walker, overseeing the crossing of his wagon train over the Powder River. In his words, Cole ordered the train, "out of the timber and corralled", and the 12th Missouri Volunteer Cavalry "to skirmish through the woods along the river bank to drive out a body of Indians who were posted in the woods". A German immigrant, First Lieutenant Charles H. Springer, of Company B, 12th Missouri Cavalry, said that this took place at about 1:00 p.m. Springer, who was with the 12th Missouri clearing out the woods, described the scene in front of the command: "The whole bottom and hills in advance were covered full of Indians, or to use a soldiers expression, they were thicker than fiddlers in hell". The 12th Missouri, 15th Kansas, 16th Kansas, and one battalion of the 2nd Missouri Light Artillery along with both artillery sections advanced simultaneously toward the warriors. The cannon were unlimbered and began firing at Indians gathered in some woods located in a bend of the Powder River. George Bent, a Cheyenne participant, said that the soldiers formed in a square around their wagons, and that Roman Nose performed several bravery rides along the front of the soldiers' skirmish line before his white pony was shot and killed, throwing him to the ground. Lieutenant Springer of the 12th Missouri mentioned the same incident in his diary, stating that an Indian had been making gestures in front of his line before a volley brought down his horse and made him "bite the dust". Bent said that Black Whetstone, an elderly Cheyenne man, was killed by one of the soldier's artillery shells during the battle, while smoking a pipe behind a hill. As Cole committed more men to the battle, gradually the Sioux and Cheyenne pulled off from the engagement. The last action of the battle took place on bluffs overlooking the east side of the Powder River, just south of the confluence of what is now called Pilgrim Creek and the river, when Major Lyman G. Bennett led a handful of soldiers up a steep hill that was being held by a few warriors. The men charged up the hill, driving away the remaining warriors. In the charge, a soldier of the 16th Kansas was wounded in the foot. The action on September 8 was called Roman Nose's Fight by the Cheyenne. One soldier was killed and two were wounded. At least one Native American was killed and another wounded. The soldiers lost at least 36 horses captured during the engagement, while at least three native horses were killed or wounded. The battlefield is located on private land near the confluence of Pilgrim Creek, Little Pilgrim Creek, and the Powder River, in Powder River County, Montana, about 5 miles (8.0 km) northeast of present-day Broadus, Montana. It has not changed very much from its 1865 appearance, and is accessible from Powderville West Road on the east side of the river, but there are no signs marking the site.

== September 9–10 ==
On September 9 Cole and Walker only moved about two and a half miles. On the morning of September 10, 1865, the over 2,000 soldiers and civilians of Cole's and Walker's columns were encamped together along the Powder River opposite the confluence of the Little Powder River in present-day Powder River County, Montana. The camp was packed and almost all of the soldiers had moved out when Native American warriors appeared. Lieutenant Charles Springer wrote in his diary that as the last of the soldiers left the camp of the previous night, the Native American warriors "came charging down from the hills, but a volley from Comp. A and C sent them back amongst the hills." Comp. A and C that Springer referred to were Companies A and C, of the 12th Missouri Volunteer Cavalry Regiment. There were volleys and some sporadic firing. The 12th Missouri Volunteer Cavalry Regiment that Springer was a member of was commanded by Colonel Oliver Wells, who later reported "On the 10th the Indians nearly enveloped the camp as the command moved out, and followed on our flank and rear until about noon. But little was accomplished, however, and much useless firing was done. The Indians had this day about four or five good muskets. One of our men was slightly wounded, and three Indians were shot, but carried of by their comrades."

The Eastern column's chief engineering officer, Lyman Bennett, wrote in his diary on September 10, 1865, that:

We commenced the march and coming to the river, found it swollen so that it could not be easily crossed. Indians also menaced the head of the column and their heads could by seen in the hundreds protruding from the tops of the hills. We finally found another ford above and crossed the command only losing one wagon though many men and horses were thrown into the water. A few Indians hovered around our advance for a few miles and then hauled of and we saw no more of them.

— Major Lyman G. Bennett, September 10, 1865

The Little Powder River battlefield is situated on private land near Powderville West Road along the Powder River in Powder River County, Montana. It is located less than 3 miles (4.8 km) north-east of present-day Broadus, Montana.

== September 11–15 ==
The expedition continued south up the Powder River. On September 12, Cole's and Walker's columns marched past Terrett Butte. On September 13, the columns crossed into Dakota Territory in present-day Wyoming. On September 14, there was another small skirmish and one soldier was killed. It was the last Indian fight that Cole's and Walker's columns would participate in. On September 15, four scouts from General Connor's column found Cole's and Walker's commands on the Powder River in Dakota Territory and informed them of the newly established Fort Connor, located on the Powder River east of present-day Kaycee, Wyoming. The leader of the detail, Corporal Charles L. Thomas of the 11th Ohio Cavalry, had been wounded earlier in the day and rescued Private John Hutson, a soldier from the 2nd Missouri left behind by Cole's column, enroute. Thomas was later awarded the Medal of Honor for his actions.

== After ==
Cole, Walker and their soldiers arrived at Fort Connor on September 20, 1865. Connor deemed the soldiers unfit for further service and sent them back to Fort Laramie and Fort Leavenworth, Kansas, where most of them were mustered out of the army.

== Casualties ==
Fourteen soldiers were killed or mortally wounded between September 1–15, and three died of disease, making a total of seventeen killed during the ten-day period. At least thirteen soldiers were wounded in the various skirmishes between September 1–15, two by friendly fire. At least seven Native American warriors were killed and eleven wounded between September 1–15. Cole claimed that his soldiers had killed two hundred Indians. By contrast, Walker said, "I cannot say as we killed one." Indian casualties were likely light.

Native Americans

Killed in action-

- Black Whetstone, Native American, September 8.
- At least six unidentified warriors and people, Lakota, Cheyenne and Arapaho, September 1–15.

Wounded in action-

- At least eleven unidentified warriors and people, Lakota, Cheyenne and Arapaho, September 1–15.

United States Army

Killed in action-

- Sergeant Larkin L. Holt, Battery K, 2nd Missouri Artillery, September 1.
- Private Jesse Easter, Battery K, 2nd Missouri Artillery, September 1.
- Private Abner Garrison, Battery K, 2nd Missouri Artillery, September 1.
- Private George Cooper, Battery L, 2nd Missouri Artillery, September 1.
- Private George W. Jackson, Battery L, 2nd Missouri Artillery, September 1.
- Private Reuben B. Cavender, Battery H, 2nd Missouri Artillery, September 2.
- Private George W. McCulley, Company B, 12th Missouri Cavalry, September 5.
- Private James D. Morris, Company B, 12th Missouri Cavalry, September 5.
- Private Elijah Bradshaw, Company A, 12th Missouri Cavalry, September 7.
- Private William P. Long, Company E, 16th Kansas Cavalry, September 8.
- Private David Noble, Company F, 12th Missouri Cavalry, September 14.

Mortally wounded-

- Private Robert W. Walker, Battery K, 2nd Missouri Artillery, mortally wounded September 1, died of wounds September 2.
- Private Andrew J. Baucom, Battery H, 2nd Missouri Artillery, mortally wounded September 2, died of wounds September 7.
- Private Isaac Tracy, Battery L, 2nd Missouri Artillery, mortally wounded September 2, died of wounds September 10.

Died of disease-

- Private Henry Grote, Battery B, 2nd Missouri Artillery, died of scurvy September 4.
- Private William Lucas, Company F, 12th Missouri Cavalry, died of dysentery September 7.
- Private Henry Duffey, Battery D, 2nd Missouri Artillery, died of scurvy September 9.

Wounded in action-

- Sergeant James L. Duckett, Battery K, 2nd Missouri Artillery, September 1.
- Two soldiers wounded by friendly fire, Cole's command, September 1.
- Second Lieutenant Hiram L. Kelly, Battery B, 2nd Missouri Artillery, September 5.
- Private Charles H. Eliot, Company B, 12th Missouri Cavalry, September 5.
- Two soldiers wounded, 12th Missouri Cavalry, September 5.
- Corporal John Price, Company G, 16th Kansas Cavalry, September 8.
- Three soldiers wounded, Walker's command, September 8.
- One soldier wounded, Cole's command, September 10.
- Corporal Charles L. Thomas, Company E, 11th Ohio Cavalry, September 15.

== Order of battle ==
United States Army, Powder River Expedition, September 1–11, 1865. Col Nelson D. Cole, 2nd Missouri Artillery, commanding.

Expedition	Column	Regiments and Others
Powder River Expedition, Col Nelson D. Cole	Center, Middle Division Ltc Samuel Walker	15th Kansas Volunteer Cavalry Regiment (Company H): Second Lt Edward Gill; 16th Kansas Volunteer Cavalry Regiment (Eight companies including D, E, F, G and M): Ltc Samuel Walker; Mountain Howitzer artillery section (2 Cannon), manned by men from Company H, 15th Kansas Cavalry and Company M, 16th Kansas Cavalry: Second Lt Edward Gill
Powder River Expedition, Col Nelson D. Cole	Right, Eastern Division Col Nelson D. Cole	2nd Missouri Volunteer Light Artillery Regiment, (Batteries B, C, D, E, H, K, L, and M): Colonel Nelson D. Cole; 12th Missouri Volunteer Cavalry Regiment (Eight companies including A, B, C and F): Col Oliver Wells; Ordnance Rifle artillery section (2 Cannon), (manned by men from 2nd Missouri Artillery): United States Signal Corps (Detachment, 7 men): Second Lt Frederick J. Amsden

United States Army, Powder River Expedition Detachment, September 15, 1865. Corporal Charles L. Thomas, 11th Ohio Cavalry.

Expedition	Detachment	Strength
Powder River Expedition Detachment, Western Column	Four soldiers and scouts Corporal Charles L. Thomas	Corporal Charles L. Thomas, Company E, 11th Ohio Cavalry; One unidentified soldier, 11th Ohio Cavalry; Two unidentified Pawnee, Omaha or Winnebago Indian Scouts

Native Americans, Lakota (Brulé, Oglala, Sans Arc, Hunkpapa, Miniconjou and Blackfeet) Sioux, Northern and Southern Cheyenne, and Arapaho.

Native Americans	Tribe	Leaders
Native Americans	Lakota Sioux	Red Cloud, Oglala; Sitting Bull, Hunkpapa
Native Americans	Northern and Southern Cheyenne	Roman Nose; Little Wolf; George Bent; Charles Bent; Black Whetstone †
Native Americans	Arapaho	Unknown

== See also ==
- Powder River Expedition
- Nelson D. Cole
- Samuel Walker
- Roman Nose
- George Bent
