= Montana Territory in the American Civil War =

The area that eventually became the U.S. state of Montana played little direct role in the American Civil War. The closest the Confederate States Army ever came to the area was New Mexico and eastern Kansas, each over a thousand miles away. There was not even an organized territory using "Montana" until the Montana Territory was created on May 26, 1864, three years after the Battle of Fort Sumter. In 1861, the area was divided between the Dakota Territory and the Washington Territory, and in 1863, it was part of the Idaho Territory.

Nevertheless, Confederate sympathizers did have a presence in what is now the U.S. state of Montana. Those in the Montana Territory who supported the Confederate side were varied. Among them were Confederate sympathizers who were determined that some of Montana's gold would go into the Southern instead of Northern coffers. But most were those who would rather not fight in the war, which ranged from pure drifters to actual Confederate deserters.

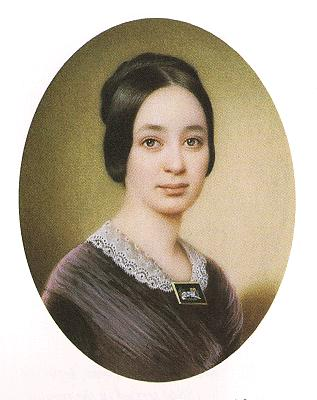
Varina Davis

In southwest Montana, Madison County residents of the area native to the Southeast United States wished to name their new town Varina, in honor of Varina Davis, the wife of the Confederate President Jefferson Davis. The Varina Townsite Company, on June 16, 1863, went to confirm the 320 acres (1.3 km^{2}) of land as the town of Varina. However, when they applied for the name, the judge—Connecticut native Dr. G.G. Bissell—refused, saying they would be "damned" before he would allow the town to be named for the first lady of the Confederacy. Bissell did say he would allow the company to name the town after the state of Virginia, and they did so, incorporating the town of Virginia City. Charles Dickens even mentioned it in his book All the Year Round. The town would remain sympathetic to the South, even after being named the capital of Montana. The loyalty towards the Confederacy concerned many supporters of the Union. Seeing this, Sidney Edgerton in 1863 went quickly to see Abraham Lincoln about the situation, and this was one impetus to create the Montana Territory so quickly.

Gold mining in Montana began during the Civil War; gold placer deposits were discovered at Bannack in 1862. The resulting gold rush resulted in more placer discoveries, including those at Virginia City in 1863 and at Helena and Butte in 1864. Gold from the Montana gold mines went to both sides of the conflict. In Broadwater County, in the central portion of the state, Confederate sympathizers found a vein of gold eight miles (13 km) west of Townsend, with the immediate area named "Confederate Gulch" in their honor. It was said to be among the "largest and richest of the placer diggings" within the state.

== Civil War Regiments in Montana Territory ==
Although no organized Confederate forces reached Montana Territory, a series of union regiments, most of which were raised to fight confederates in the south, instead found themselves far to the west of the Civil War, fighting Native Americans and guarding outposts in Montana Territory. They are listed here:

=== Infantry ===
- 1st United States Volunteer Infantry Regiment, "Galvanized Yankees", In 1865 Company H served at Fort Benton, deep within Montana Territory, and the same year Company B was stationed at Fort Union, Dakota Territory (just outside the Montana border). Company H gained the designation of serving the farthest north out of all the companies of the "Galvanized Yankees".
- 8th Minnesota Volunteer Infantry Regiment, 2nd Brigade, District of Iowa - Part of Brigadier General Alfred Sully's 1864 Expedition against the Sioux, all ten companies (A, B, C, D, E, F, G, H, I, and K) of this regiment after being mounted on horses marched along the Yellowstone River in the eastern part of Montana Territory in July, 1864. This regiment was then transferred to the Department of the Cumberland and Nashville, Tennessee, going on to fight with the 23rd Corps at the Battle of Wyse Fork, North Carolina. In the last year of the Civil War, the 8th Minnesota saw service in Minnesota, Dakota Territory, Montana Territory, Alabama, Washington, D.C., and North Carolina, traveling more miles than any other regiment of the Union Army.
- 30th Wisconsin Volunteer Infantry Regiment, One company (I) of this regiment garrisoned Fort Union, Dakota Territory from 1864 until June, 1865. Fort Union was located just outside Montana in present-day North Dakota.

=== Cavalry ===
- 1st Dakota Territory Volunteer Cavalry Battalion, 2nd Brigade, District of Iowa - Part of Brigadier General Alfred Sully's 1864 Expedition against the Sioux, the two companies (A and B) that made up this battalion marched along the Yellowstone River in the eastern part of Montana Territory in July, 1864.
- 2nd California Volunteer Cavalry Regiment, Western Column, Powder River Expedition - Two companies (L and M) of this regiment accompanied Colonel James H. Kidd's left column of the Powder River Expedition of 1865, traveling down the Tongue River valley.
- 2nd Minnesota Volunteer Cavalry Regiment, 2nd Brigade, District of Iowa - Part of Brigadier General Alfred Sully's 1864 Expedition against the Sioux, six companies of this regiment marched along the Yellowstone River in the eastern part of Montana Territory in July, 1864.
- 6th Iowa Volunteer Cavalry Regiment, 1st Brigade, District of Iowa - Part of Brigadier General Alfred Sully's 1864 Expedition against the Sioux, eleven companies of this regiment marched along the Yellowstone River in the eastern part of Montana Territory in July, 1864.
- 6th Michigan Volunteer Cavalry Regiment, Western Column, Powder River Expedition - This regiment, which is most known for being part of Custer's Michigan Cavalry Brigade in the Army of the Potomac, found four of its companies accompanying Colonel James H. Kidd's western column of the Powder River Expedition of 1865, traveling down the Tongue River valley.
- 7th Iowa Volunteer Cavalry Regiment, 1st Brigade, District of Iowa and Western Column, Powder River Expedition - Part of Brigadier General Alfred Sully's 1864 Expedition against the Sioux, three companies of this regiment marched along the Yellowstone River in the eastern part of Montana Territory in July, 1864. The next year, one company (F) of the regiment accompanied Colonel James H. Kidd's western column of the Powder River Expedition of 1865, traveling down the Tongue River valley.
- 11th Ohio Volunteer Cavalry Regiment, Western Column, Powder River Expedition - This regiment, initially organized as the 7th Ohio Cavalry and then the 6th Ohio Cavalry, found two of its companies (E and K) accompanying Colonel James H. Kidd's western column of the Powder River Expedition of 1865, traveling down the Tongue River valley.
- 12th Missouri Volunteer Cavalry Regiment, Eastern Column, Powder River Expedition - All twelve companies of this regiment (A, B, C, D, E, F, G, H, I, K, L, and M) marched out from Omaha, Nebraska as part of Colonel Nelson D. Cole's eastern column of the Powder River Expedition of 1865, participating in fighting against Native American's throughout the Powder River country of southeastern Montana.
- 15th Kansas Volunteer Cavalry Regiment, Central Column, Powder River Expedition - One company of this regiment, (H) acting as an artillery battery marched north from Fort Laramie, Dakota Territory as part of Lieutenant Colonel Samuel Walker's central column of the Powder River Expedition of 1865, participating in fighting against Native American's throughout the Powder River country of southeastern Montana.
- 16th Kansas Volunteer Cavalry Regiment, Central Column, Powder River Expedition - Eight companies of this regiment marched north from Fort Laramie, Dakota Territory as part of Lieutenant Colonel Samuel Walker's central column of the Powder River Expedition of 1865, participating in fighting against Native American's throughout the Powder River country of southeastern Montana.
- Brackett's Minnesota Volunteer Cavalry Battalion, 1st Brigade, District of Iowa - Commanded by Major Alfred B. Brackett, the battalion was part of Brigadier General Alfred Sully's 1864 Expedition against the Sioux, this regiment marched along the Yellowstone River in the eastern part of Montana Territory in July, 1864.
- Independent Company, Pawnee Scouts, Nebraska Cavalry, Western Column, Powder River Expedition - This company, made up of Pawnee's, and commanded by Captain Frank Joshua North, accompanied Colonel James H. Kidd's western column of the Powder River Expedition of 1865, fighting and scouting around the Tongue and Powder River country in southeastern Montana.
- Independent Company, Omaha and Winnebago Scouts, Nebraska Cavalry, Western Column, Powder River Expedition - This company, made up of Omaha's and Winnebago's, and commanded by Captain Edwin W. Nash, accompanied Colonel James H. Kidd's western column of the Powder River Expedition of 1865, scouting throughout the Tongue River valley.
- Stufft's Independent Company of Indian Scouts, Nebraska Cavalry, 2nd Brigade, District of Iowa - Commanded by Captain Christian Stufft, the company was part of Brigadier General Alfred Sully's 1864 Expedition against the Sioux, this company marched along the Yellowstone River in the eastern part of Montana Territory in July, 1864.

=== Artillery ===
- 2nd Missouri Volunteer Light Artillery Regiment, Eastern and Western Columns, Powder River Expedition - After serving in the South (with Battery H fighting at the battles of Pilot Knob, Little Blue River, Big Blue River, and Westport, in Missouri, and at the Battle of Mine Creek, Kansas), seven Batteries of this regiment (B, C, D, E, H, L, and M) equipped as cavalry marched out from Omaha, Nebraska as part of Colonel Nelson D. Cole's eastern column of the Powder River Expedition of 1865, participating in fighting against Native American's throughout the Powder River country of southeastern Montana. Also, a detachment of 14 men from this regiment accompanied Colonel James H. Kidd's western column of the same Expedition, traveling through the Tongue River valley.
- 3rd Minnesota Volunteer Light Artillery Battery, 2nd Brigade, District of Iowa - Part of Brigadier General Alfred Sully's 1864 Expedition against the Sioux, this battery marched along the Yellowstone River in the eastern part of the Montana Territory in 1864.
- Prairie Light Artillery Battery, 1st Brigade, District of Iowa - Part of Brigadier General Alfred Sully's 1864 Expedition against the Sioux, this battery marched along the Yellowstone River in the eastern part of the Montana Territory in 1864.

=== Miscellaneous ===
- United States Signal Corps, Western and Eastern Columns, Powder River Expedition - Two separate U.S. Signal Corps detachments, both made up of men from the Department of Missouri who had recently participated in Civil War campaigns in the east, accompanied the Powder River Expedition of 1865, with the first detachment of 15 men accompanying Colonel James Kidd's western column in traveling down the Tongue River valley, and the second detachment of 7 men joining Colonel Nelson D. Cole's eastern column from Omaha, Nebraska, campaigning against Native American's throughout the Powder River country of southeastern Montana.

== Gallery ==
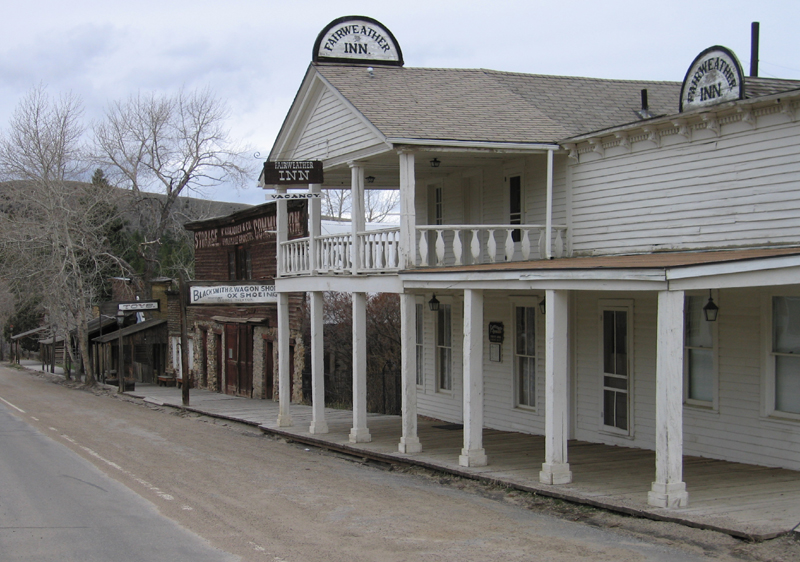
Historic area of Virginia City

== See also ==
- History of Montana
  - Bibliography of Montana history
  - Historical outline of Montana
  - List of people in Montana history
  - Territorial evolution of Montana
    - Territory of Montana
    - State of Montana
  - Timeline of Montana history
    - Timeline of pre-statehood Montana history
