= Battery H, 2nd Missouri Light Artillery Regiment =

- Active: January 1862 to November 20, 1865
- Country: United States
- Allegiance: Union
- Branch: Artillery
- Engagements: American Civil War: Price's Raid; Battle of Pilot Knob; Battle of Little Blue River; Battle of Westport; Battle of Mine Creek; Second Battle of Newtonia; American Indian Wars: Powder River Expedition; Powder River Battles

Battery H, 2nd Missouri Light Artillery Regiment was an artillery battery that served in the Union Army during the American Civil War and Plains Indian Wars.

== Service ==
Organized at St. Louis, Mo., January, 1862. Attached to District of St. Louis, Mo., Dept. Missouri, to September, 1863. Transferred to New Battery "C" September 29. 1863. Reorganized at Springfield, Mo., December 4, 1863. Attached to District of Southwest Missouri, Dept. Missouri, to June, 1865. District of the Plains, Dept. Missouri, to November, 1865.

== Detailed service ==
Duty in the District of St. Louis, Mo., till April, 1864. Expedition from New Madrid and skirmishes in swamps of Little River near Osceola and on Pemiscott Bayou April 5–9. Ordered to Cape Girardeau April 28. Actions at Ironton, Shutin Gap and Arcadia Valley September 26. Fort Davidson, Pilot Knob, September 26–27. Leesburg or Harrison September 28–29. March from Rolla to Jefferson City October 4–6. Defence of Jefferson City against Price's attack October 7–8. California, Boonville and Russellville October 9. Boonville October 9–12. Little Blue October 21. Big Blue, State Line, October 22. Westport October 23. Engagement at the Marmiton or Battle of Charlott October 25. Mine Creek, Little Osage River, Marias des Cygnes, October 25. Newtonia October 28. At Franklin till June, 1865. Moved to Omaha, Neb., June 11–20. Powder River Expedition. March to Powder River and Fort Connor July 1-September 20. Actions on Powder River September 2–3. Mustered out November 20, 1865.

== Commanders ==
- Captain William C. F. Montgomery

== See also ==
- 2nd Missouri Light Artillery Regiment
- Missouri Civil War Union units
- Missouri in the Civil War
