= Charles L. Thomas (Medal of Honor, 1865) =

Charles Lawrence Thomas
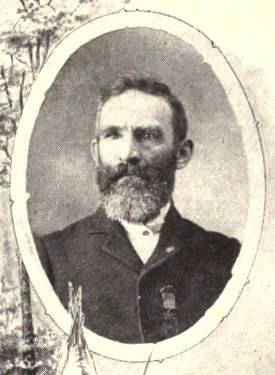
- Charles L. Thomas as depicted in Deeds of Valor, Volume II
- Born: February 12, 1843; Philadelphia, Pennsylvania, US
- Died: February 24, 1923 (aged 80); Dwight, Kansas, US
- Military career
- Allegiance: United States
- Branch: United States Army
- Service years: 1863–1866
- Rank: Sergeant
- Unit: 11th Ohio Volunteer Cavalry
- Conflicts: Indian wars: Powder River Expedition
- Awards: Medal of Honor

Charles Lawrence Thomas (February 12, 1843 – February 24, 1923) was a United States Army soldier who received the Medal of Honor for heroism in September 1865 during the Powder River Expedition in Montana and Dakota Territory.

== Biography ==
Charles L. Thomas was born on February 12, 1843, in Philadelphia, Pennsylvania. He left his home at Boudes Ferry Landing, Ohio to enlist in the 11th Ohio Cavalry in June 1863. He was mustered in at Cincinnati, Ohio. Thomas served in the West along the Overland Road for the duration of the Civil War, earning a promotion to Corporal in February 1864.

During the Powder River Expedition in Montana Territory in September, 1865, Captain Frank North returned to the camp of Brigadier General Patrick E. Connor, Companies E and K, of the 11th Ohio Cavalry, and the left wing of the Powder River Expedition after a scout with 50 men. He reported that the right and center columns of the Powder River Expedition under Colonel Nelson D. Cole and Lieutenant Colonel Samuel Walker were surrounded by Indians on the Powder River. General Patrick Conner called for a volunteer "to go as a scout and find Cole or perish in the attempt." Corporal Charles L. Thomas was the only man who volunteered to go. Connor detailed Thomas, one other soldier, and two Indian scouts to carry out the mission. Connor told him he could have any animal in the camp for his mission, so Thomas chose Second Lieutenant Oscar Jewett's fine gray horse, which he said "was the finest horse I ever saw." Jewett objected and Connor threatened to have him arrested. Corporal Thomas and the three other unnamed men left Conner's camp at 7 a.m. on September 14, 1865, to find Colonels Cole and Walker and deliver to them a message from General Connor. That first day, the small party had several fights with small groups of Indians in the area, and they continued traveling throughout the night. On the second day, as they followed Cole's and Walker's trail along the Powder River, Thomas' group was again sighted and "began to exchange shots - it was a running fight for the balance of the day." Thomas was wounded by an arrow in the right leg, and he killed an Indian warrior and captured his horse, which had a U.S. Cavalry brand and had previously belonged to an unfortunate soldier of the 6th Michigan Cavalry. Thomas kept the animal with him in case his own horse was shot. Later that day, he rescued Private John Hutson of the 2nd Missouri Light Artillery, who had been abandoned by Cole's column because he was unable to walk. Hutson was hiding when Thomas found the private. Charles got him onto the spare horse, and brought him into Cole's and Walker's camp when they arrived at about 9 p.m. and delivered General Connor's message. The four men had ridden for 39 hours traveling over 135 miles alone in hostile territory. Thomas recalled that he had "left Camp Connor with over 350 rounds of ammunition and had 17 shots left when I arrived at Colonel Cole's Camp." He also said that "My old Spencer rifle was getting so hot I could not hold the barrel with my necked hand." The next morning, September 16, Connor provided Thomas' detail with an escort of 15 men commanded by Lieutenant Thomas H. Jones of the 2nd Missouri Artillery to report back to General Connor. Corporal Thomas and the two scouts arrived back at his camp on September 18, 1865. In all, Thomas and his three companions rode nearly 200 miles in less than 100 hours.

Charles Thomas was promoted to Sergeant and mustered out in 1866. He returned to Ohio and later moved to Kansas. He was awarded the Medal of Honor on August 24, 1894. Charles L. Thomas died on February 24, 1923, in Dwight, Kansas.

== Medal of Honor citation ==
Rank and organization: Sergeant, Company E, 11th Ohio Cavalry. Place and date: At Powder River, Montana and Dakota Territory, September 14–18, 1865. Entered service at: Ohio, United States Birth: Philadelphia, Pennsylvania Date of issue: August 24, 1894.

Citation:

Carried a message through a country infested with hostile Indians and saved the life of a comrade en route.

== See also ==
- List of Medal of Honor recipients
- List of Medal of Honor recipients for the Indian Wars
