= Battery B, 2nd Missouri Light Artillery Regiment =

- Active: January 1862 to December 20, 1865
- Country: United States
- Allegiance: Union
- Branch: Artillery
- Engagements: American Civil War: Price's Raid; American Indian Wars: Powder River Expedition; Powder River Battles

Battery B, 2nd Missouri Light Artillery Regiment was an artillery battery that served in the Union Army during the American Civil War and Plains Indian Wars.

== Service ==
Organized at St. Louis, Mo., January, 1862. Attached to District of St. Louis, Mo., Dept. Missouri, to June, 1864. District of Rolla, Mo., Dept. Missouri, to October, 1864. District of St. Louis, Mo., Dept. Missouri, to July, 1865. District of the Plains, Dept. Missouri, to December, 1865.

== Detailed service ==
Duty in Forts about St. Louis, Mo., till February, 1863. Garrison duty at New Madrid, Mo., till April 24, 1864. At Cape Girardeau till May. Moved to Springfield, Mo., via St. Louis and Sedalia, thence to Rolla, Mo., June 20, and duty there till October. March from Rolla to Jefferson City October 4–6 (Detachment). Moreau Creek October 7. Jefferson City October 7–8. Expedition to Rocheport October 11–29. At Rocheport till November 13, then rejoined Battery at Rolla. Moved to Franklin November 19–21, and duty there till June 1, 1865. Ordered to St. Louis June 1 and equipped as Cavalry. Moved to Omaha, Neb., June 11–20. Powder River Expedition. March to Powder River and Fort Connor July 1-September 20. Actions on Powder River September 2–8. Mustered out December 20, 1865.

== Commanders ==
- Captain Samuel Flagg

== See also ==
- 2nd Missouri Light Artillery Regiment
- Missouri Civil War Union units
- Missouri in the Civil War
