= Battery K, 2nd Missouri Light Artillery Regiment =

- Active: January 1862 to November 25, 1865
- Country: United States
- Allegiance: Union
- Branch: Union Army
- Type: Artillery
- Size: Battery
- Engagements: American Civil War: Battle of Bayou Fourche; Price's Raid; Battle of Little Blue River; American Indian Wars: Powder River Expedition; Powder River Battles

Battery K, 2nd Missouri Light Artillery Regiment was an artillery battery that served in the Union Army during the American Civil War and Plains Indian Wars.

== Service ==
Organized at St. Louis, Mo., January, 1862. Attached to District of St. Louis, Mo., Dept. of Missouri, to June, 1863. Artillery, 1st Cavalry Division, Army of Southeast Missouri, Dept. of Missouri, to July, 1863. Reserve Brigade, 1st Cavalry Division, District of Southeast Missouri, Dept. of Missouri, to August, 1863. Artillery, 1st Cavalry Division, Arkansas Expedition, to September, 1863. Attached to District of St. Louis, Mo., Dept. of Missouri, to June, 1865. District of the Plains, Dept. of Missouri, to November, 1865.

== Detailed service ==
Duty in District of St. Louis till July, 1863. Operations against Marmaduke April 16-May 2, 1863. Castor River, near Bloomfield, April 29. Bloomfield April 30. Join Davidson's Cavalry Division at Pilot Knob June, 1863. Davidson's march to join Steele and Steele's Expedition to Little Rock, Ark., July 1-September 10. Bayou Metoe or Reed's Bridge August 27. Bayou Fourche and capture of Little Rock September 10. Pursuit of Price September 11–13. Near Little Rock September 11. Transferred to New Battery "D" September 29, 1863. Reorganized at Springfield, Mo., January 14, 1864. Duty in the District of St. Louis, Mo., till June, 1865. Expedition from New Madrid, Mo., and skirmishes in swamps of Little River, near Oceola and on Pemiscott Bayou, April 5–9, 1864. Leesburg and Harrison September 28–29. Little Blue October 21. Big Blue and State Line October 22. At Franklin, Mo., till June, 1865. Moved to Omaha, Neb., June 11–20. Powder River Expedition. March to Powder River and Fort Connor July 11-September 20. Skirmishes on Powder River September 2–8. Mustered out November 25, 1865.

== Commanders ==
- Captain Edward S. Rowland

== See also ==
- 2nd Missouri Light Artillery Regiment
- Missouri Civil War Union units
- Missouri in the Civil War
