= Battery D, 2nd Missouri Light Artillery Regiment =

- Active: January 1862 to November 21, 1865
- Country: United States
- Allegiance: Union
- Branch: Artillery
- Engagements: American Civil War: Battle of Cape Girardeau; American Indian Wars: Powder River Expedition; Powder River Battles

Battery D, 2nd Missouri Light Artillery Regiment was an artillery battery that served in the Union Army during the American Civil War and Plains Indian Wars.

== Service ==
Organized at St. Louis, Mo., January 1862. Attached to District of St. Louis, Mo., Dept. Missouri, to March, 1863. District of Southeast Missouri, Dept. Missouri, to August, 1863. District of St Louis, Mo., to September, 1863. Battery reorganized from Batteries "A," "F," "G" and "K" September 20, 1863. District of St. Louis, Mo., to December, 1863. Artillery, 1st Cavalry Division, Army Arkansas, and 7th Army Corps, Dept. of Arkansas, to May, 1864. Artillery, 2nd Division, 7th Army Corps, to February, 1865. Mouth of White River, Ark., to August, 1865. Ordered to St. Louis, Mo. Duty in District of the Plains, Dept. Missouri till November, 1865.

== Detailed service ==
Duty at Cape Girardeau, Mo., till July, 1863. Operations against Marmaduke April 17-May 2. Battle of Cape Girardeau April 26. Moved to St. Louis, Mo., July and duty there till September, 1863. At Bloomfield till December. Moved to Rolla via Pilot Knob December 1, 1863, thence march with 1st Nebraska Cavalry to Batesville, Ark. Duty at Batesville and Duvall's Bluff, Ark., till January, 1865. Near Batesville February 20, 1864. Pikeville May 25, 1864. Operations on White River June 20–29. Near Clarendon and St. Charles June 25–26, and pursuit to Bayou DeView June 26–28. Augusta September 2. Duty at Post of St. Charles January, 1865, to June, 1865, and at mouth of White River till August. Ordered to St. Louis June 1. Equipped as Cavalry. Moved to Omaha, Neb., June 11–20. Powder River Expedition. March to Powder River and Fort Connor July 1-September 20. Actions on Powder River September 2–10. Mustered out November 21, 1865.

== See also ==
- 2nd Missouri Light Artillery Regiment
- Missouri Civil War Union units
- Missouri in the Civil War
