= Battery M, 2nd Missouri Light Artillery Regiment =

- Active: January 1862 to December 20, 1865
- Country: United States
- Allegiance: Union
- Branch: Artillery
- Engagements: American Civil War: Battle of Bayou Fourche; Price's Raid; American Indian Wars: Powder River Expedition; Powder River Battles

Battery M, 2nd Missouri Light Artillery Regiment was an artillery battery that served in the Union Army during the American Civil War and Plains Indian Wars.

== Service ==
Organized at St. Louis, Mo., January, 1862. Attached to District of St. Louis, Mo., Dept. of Missouri, to November, 1862. 2nd Division, Army of Southeast Missouri, Dept. of Missouri, to March, 1863. District of Southeast Missouri, Dept. of Missouri, to June, 1863. Artillery, 1st Cavalry Division, District of Southeast Missouri, to July, 1863. Artillery Reserve, Cavalry Division, Army of Southeast Missouri, Dept. of Missouri, to August, 1863. Artillery 1st Cavalry Division, Arkansas Expedition, to September, 1863. Attached to District of St. Louis, Mo., to June, 1865.

== Detailed service ==
Duty in District of St. Louis till November, 1862. Pitman's Ferry, Ark., October 27, 1862. At St. Louis till June, 1863. Joined Division at Pilot Knob, Mo., June, 1863. Davidson's march to join Steele and Steele's Expedition to Little Rock, Ark., July 1-September 10. March to Clarendon, on White River, July 1-August 8. Shallow Ford Bayou, Metoe, August 30. Bayou Fourche and capture of Little Rock September 10. Pursuit of Price September 11–14. Near Little Rock September 11. Transferred to new Battery "E" September 29, 1863. Reorganized at St. Louis, Mo., February 15, 1864. Duty at St. Louis till August, 1864. Ordered to Springfield, Mo., August 15, and duty there till November. Moved to Paducah, Ky., November 10, to Rolla November 26, thence to Franklin, Mo., and duty there till June, 1865. Moved to Omaha, Neb., June 11–20. Powder River Expedition. March to Powder River and Fort Connor July 1-September 20. Actions on Powder River September 2–8. Mustered out December 20, 1865.

== Commanders ==
- Captain Napoleon Boardman

== See also ==
- 2nd Missouri Light Artillery Regiment
- Missouri Civil War Union units
- Missouri in the Civil War
