= Battery E, 2nd Missouri Light Artillery Regiment =

- Active: January 1862 to November 22, 1865
- Country: United States
- Allegiance: Union
- Branch: Artillery
- Engagements: American Civil War: Battle of Cape Girardeau; Battle of Elkin's Ferry; Battle of Prairie D'Ane; Battle of Marks' Mills; American Indian Wars: Powder River Expedition; Powder River Battles

Battery E, 2nd Missouri Light Artillery Regiment was an artillery battery that served in the Union Army during the American Civil War and Plains Indian Wars.

== Service ==
Organized at St Louis, Mo., January, 1862. Attached to District of St. Louis to September, 1863. Reorganized September 29, 1863, from Batteries "E," "L," "M." District of St. Louis, Mo., to December, 1863. Artillery, 1st Cavalry Division, Army Arkansas, and 7th Army Corps, Dept. of Arkansas, to April, 1864. Artillery, 3rd Division, 7th Army Corps, to May, 1864. Artillery, 1st Division, 7th Army Corps, to June. 1865. District of the Plains, Dept. Missouri, to November, 1865.

== Detailed service ==
Duty in District of St. Louis, Mo., till December, 1863. Actions at Bloomfield, Mo., September 11 and October 22, 1862. Cape Girardeau April 26, 1863. Ordered to Little Rock, Ark. December, 1863, and duty there till March, 1864. Steele's Expedition to Camden April 23-May 3. Elkin's Ferry, Little Missouri River, April 3–4, 1864. Prairie D'Ann April 9–12. Camden April 15–18. Marks' Mills April 25. Duty at Little Rock till June, 1865. Ordered to St Louis, Mo., and equipped as Cavalry. Moved to Omaha, Neb. Powder River Expedition, march to Powder River and Fort Connor July 1-September 20. Actions on Powder River September 2–8. Mustered out November 22, 1865.

== Commanders ==
- Captain Jefferson Miller

== See also ==
- 2nd Missouri Light Artillery Regiment
- Missouri Civil War Union units
- Missouri in the Civil War
