= Ruby site =

The Ruby site is a Late Archaic Native American archaeological "game kill" site located in Wyoming. It is located on a dry tributary of the Powder River. The Ruby site is a corral that was used to herd bison. The bison were forced to stampede by the hunters and then ran into the enclosure which was in a low-lying area. This made it impossible for the bison to stop in time, thus proving to be an effective method of capture. The people that used the Ruby site were experts at handling stampeding animals.
