= Little Powder River =

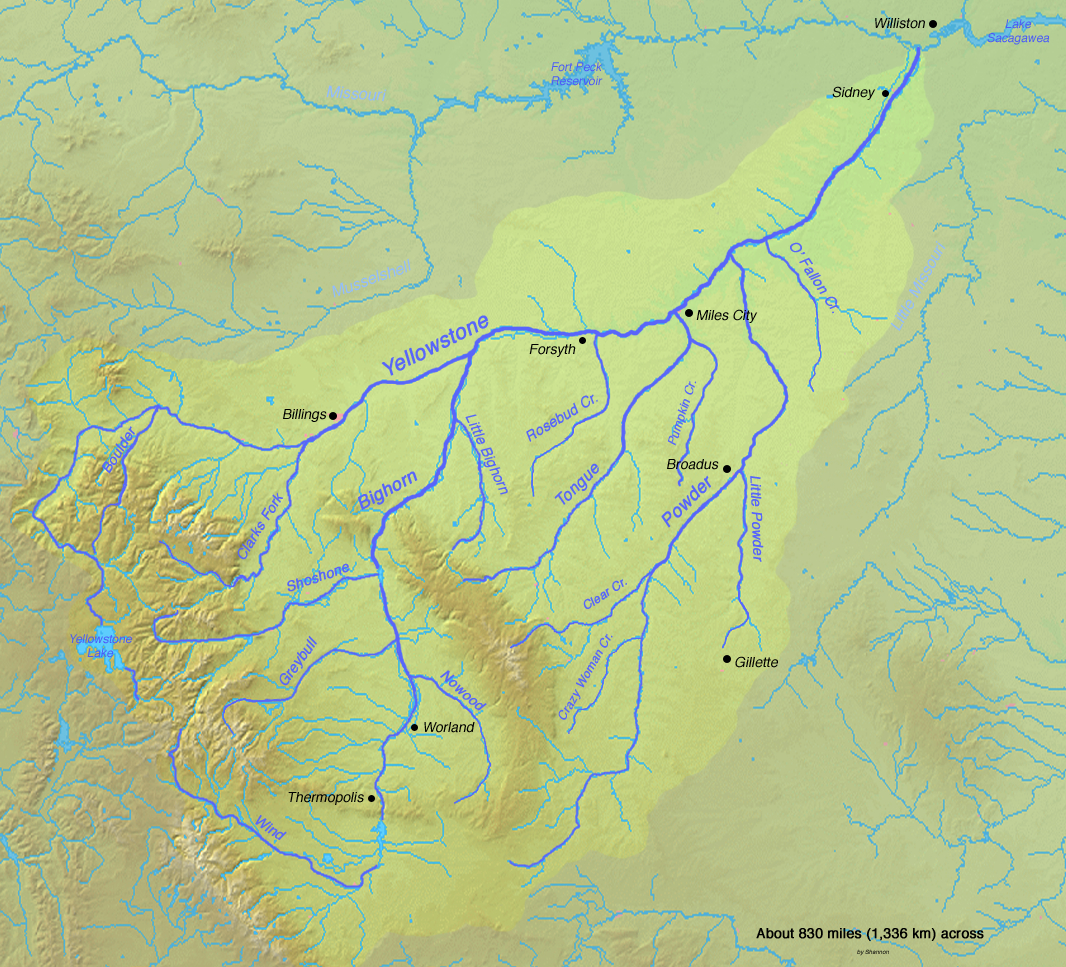
- Little Powder River within the Yellowstone River watershed

Location
- Country: United States
- State: Wyoming, Montana

Physical characteristics
- Source
  - location: Gillette,_Wyoming
  - coordinates: 44°18′44.1″N 105°27′53″W
- Mouth: Powder River
  - location: Near Broadus, Montana

The Little Powder River is a tributary of the Powder River, in southeastern Montana and northeastern Wyoming in the United States. It drains an area historically known as the Powder River Country on the high plains east of the Bighorn Mountains.

== Geography ==
The stream flows northward, east of the Bighorns, and into Montana. It is joins the Powder River near the town of Broadus. The Little Powder River was so named because the sand along a portion of its banks resembled gunpowder. The Powder River Basin near the Montana/Wyoming border is a major source of low-sulfur coal mined in the United States.

== History ==
The Raynolds Expedition traveled along a portion of the river to its mouth in July 1859, and the Battle of the Little Powder River was fought on September 10, 1865, between U.S. soldiers and civilians against Sioux, Cheyenne, and Arapaho warriors, near the river's mouth along the Powder River as part of the Powder River Expedition. In the late 19th century, its valley was a corridor used for cattle drives from Texas to Montana.

== See also ==
- Battle of the Little Powder River
- List of rivers of Montana
- Montana Stream Access Law
- List of Wyoming rivers
