= Battery C, 2nd Missouri Light Artillery Regiment =

- Active: January 1862 to December 20, 1865
- Country: United States
- Allegiance: Union
- Branch: Artillery
- Engagements: American Civil War: Price's Raid; American Indian Wars: Powder River Expedition; Powder River Battles

Battery C, 2nd Missouri Light Artillery Regiment was an artillery battery that served in the Union Army during the American Civil War and Plains Indian Wars.

== Service ==
Organized at St. Louis January, 1862. Attached to District of St. Louis, Mo., Dept. Missouri, to September, 1862. District Rolla, Dept Missouri, to February, 1863. District St Louis, Mo., Dept. Missouri, to September, 1863. Reorganized from Batteries "H" and "I" September 29, 1863. District St. Louis, Mo., Dept. Missouri, to August, 1864. District North Missouri, Dept. Missouri, to June, 1865. District Plains, Dept. Missouri, to December, 1865.

== Detailed service ==
Duty at Hartsville, Cape Girardeau and in District of St. Louis, till May 8, 1864. Ordered to St. Louis May 8. One section returned to Cape Girardeau May 23, 1864. One section at St Joseph, Mo., and one section at Warrensburg, Mo., till October, 1864. Ordered to Jefferson City, Mo., October. Defence of Jefferson City against Price's attack October 7–8. Moved to Booneville, thence to Glasgow and to Macon City, arriving November 5 (1 Section). Duty at Macon City and Cape Girardeau till June, 1865. Ordered to St. Louis June 1. Equipped as Cavalry. Moved to Omaha, Neb., June 11–20. Powder River Expedition. March to Powder River and Fort Connor July 1-September 20. Actions on Powder River September 2–8. Mustered out December 20, 1865.

== Commanders ==
- First Lieutenant William Rinne

== See also ==
- 2nd Missouri Light Artillery Regiment
- Missouri Civil War Union units
- Missouri in the Civil War
