= Battery L, 2nd Missouri Light Artillery Regiment =

- Active: January 1862 to November 25, 1865
- Country: United States
- Allegiance: Union
- Branch: Artillery
- Engagements: American Civil War: Price's Raid; Battle of Westport; Battle of Mine Creek; American Indian Wars: Powder River Expedition; Powder River Battles

Battery L, 2nd Missouri Light Artillery Regiment was an artillery battery that served in the Union Army during the American Civil War and Plains Indian Wars.

== Service ==
Organized at St. Louis, Mo., January, 1862. Attached to District of St. Louis, Mo., Dept. of Missouri, to September, 1862. District of Rolla, Dept. of Missouri, to February, 1863. District of St. Louis, Mo., Dept. of Missouri, to September, 1863. Attached to District of St. Louis, Mo., and Central District of Missouri, Dept. of Missouri, to April, 1865. District of North Missouri, Dept. of Missouri, to June, 1865. District of the Plains, Dept. of Missouri, to November, 1865.

== Detailed service ==
Duty in District of St. Louis till September, 1862. At Houston July, 1862. Action at Mountain Store, Big Piney, July 25, 1862. At Hartsville, District of Rolla, Mo., till July, 1863, and at St. Louis, Mo., till September, 1863. Scout in Wayne, Stoddard and Dunklin Counties August 20–27, 1862. Little River Bridge August 31, 1862 (Detachment). Hartsville, Wood's Fork, January 11, 1863. Transferred to new Battery "E" September 29, 1863. Reorganized at Sedalia, Mo., January 20, 1864. Duty at St. Louis and Warrenton, Mo., District of Central Missouri. Action at Moreau Bottom October 7. Defence of Jefferson City against Price's attack October 7–8. California October 9. Battle of Westport October 23. Engagement at the Marmiton or Battle of Charlot October 25. Mine Creek, Little Osage River, Marias des Cygnes, October 25. Duty in District of Central Missouri till April, 1865, and in North Missouri till June. Ordered to St. Louis, Mo. Moved to Omaha, Neb., June 11–20. Powder River Expedition. March to Powder River and Fort Connor July 1-September 20. Actions on Powder River September 2–8. Mustered out November 25, 1865.

== Commanders ==
- Captain Charles H. Thurber

== See also ==
- 2nd Missouri Light Artillery Regiment
- Missouri Civil War Union units
- Missouri in the Civil War
