= 15th Kansas Cavalry Regiment =

15th Kansas Volunteer Cavalry Regiment
- Active: October 17, 1863 – December 7, 1865
- Country: United States
- Allegiance: Union
- Branch: Cavalry
- Engagements: American Civil War: Battle of Camden Point; Second Battle of Lexington; Battle of Little Blue River; Second Battle of Independence; Battle of Byram's Ford; Battle of Westport; Battle of Marais des Cygnes; Battle of Mine Creek; Battle of Marmiton River; Second Battle of Newtonia; American Indian Wars: Powder River Expedition; Powder River Battles

The 15th Kansas Volunteer Cavalry Regiment was a cavalry regiment that served in the Union Army during the American Civil War and American Indian Wars.

== Service ==
The 15th Kansas Cavalry was organized at Leavenworth, Kansas on October 17, 1863. It mustered in for three years under the command of Colonel Charles R. Jennison. The regiment was attached to District of the Border, Department of Missouri, to January 1864. Department of Kansas to June 1864. Districts of North and South Kansas, Department of Missouri, to October 1865. The majority of the regiment mustered out of service on October 19, 1865. Company H mustered out of service on December 7, 1865.

== Detailed service ==
Assigned to duty at Leavenworth and in November 1863 went into winter quarters at Fort Riley, Kansas. In the Spring, they served at various points in southern Kansas and northern Missouri in frontier garrison duty with headquarters in Humboldt, Kansas. The locations are: Fort Leavenworth, Kansas (Companies A, B, G and H); Emporia, Kansas (Company M); Olathe, Kansas (Company K); Humboldt, Kansas (Company E); Topeka, Kansas (Company F); Paola, Kansas (Company C); along with Kansas City, Missouri (Companies I and L) and West Point, Missouri (Company D). Skirmish at Clear Creek, Missouri, May 16, 1864 (detachments of Companies D and L). Scout from Fort Leavenworth to Weston, Missouri, June 13–16, 1864. Expedition into Missouri June 16–20 (Companies B, C, and G). Price's Raid in Missouri and Kansas September to November. Lexington October 19. Little Blue October 21. Independence, Big Blue, and State Line October 22. Westport October 23. Coldwater Grove, Osage, October 24. Mine Creek, Little Osage River, and battle of Charlot October 25. Newtonia October 28. Duty in the Department of Kansas and Department of the Missouri until October 1865. The majority of the regiment mustered out of service on October 19, 1865. Company H joined the middle column of the Powder River Expedition under Lieutenant Colonel Samuel Walker in July, 1865 and marched from Fort Laramie, Dakota Territory to the Powder River then to Fort Connor, July 11 - September 20. Actions with Indians September 1–11 on Powder River, Montana Territory. Company H mustered out December 6, 1865.

== Casualties ==
The regiment lost a total of 100 men during its service, 2 officers and 19 enlisted men killed or mortally wounded, and 2 officers and 77 enlisted men who died of disease.

== Commanders ==
- Colonel Charles R. Jennison
- Lieutenant Colonel George Henry Hoyt

== Notable members ==
- Private David Lewis Payne, Company H - "Father" of Oklahoma
- Captain Orloff Norton, Company L - Namesake of Norton County, Kansas, killed near Cane Hill, Washington County, Arkansas, on November 11, 1864.
- 2nd Lieutenant David John Mosher Wood, Company B - Brother of Samuel Newitt Wood
- Captain Orren Arms Curtis, Company F - Married to a Kaw Native American. Their son was Charles Curtis, 31st Vice President of the United States.

== See also ==
- List of Kansas Civil War Units
- Kansas in the Civil War
