= Nelson D. Cole =

United States Army general

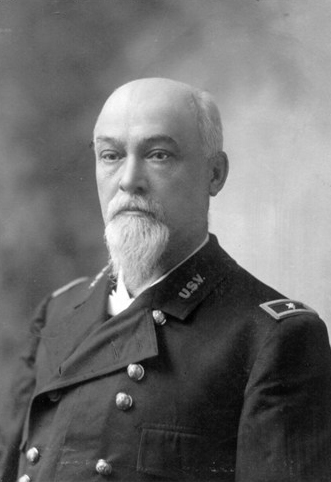
- Born: November 18, 1833; Rhinebeck, New York
- Died: July 31, 1899 (aged 76); St. Louis, Missouri
- Burial place: Bellefontain Cemetery, St. Louis, Missouri
- Military career
- Allegiance: Missouri; United States of America
- Branch: United States Army
- Service years: 1861–1865 (USA); 1898–1899 (USA)
- Rank: Captain (USV); Colonel (USV); Brigadier General (USV)
- Units: 5th Missouri Volunteer Infantry (3 months, 1861); 1st Missouri Volunteer Infantry Regiment (3 Years Organization); 1st Missouri Light Artillery Regiment
- Commands: Battery E, 1st Missouri Light Artillery (1861–1863); 2nd Missouri Light Artillery Regiment (1863–1865).; 3rd Brigade, 2nd Division, Second Army Corps (1898–1899).
- Conflicts: American Civil War: Wilson's Creek; Siege of Vicksburg; American Indian Wars: Sioux Wars; Powder River Expedition; Powder River Battles; Spanish–American War: Served within Continental U.S.
- Other work: Lumber planing mill owner, politician

Nelson D. Cole (1833–1899), was a United States army officer, businessman, and politician from Rhinebeck, New York.

== Early life ==
Cole was born on November 18, 1833, in Rhinebeck, New York. He was raised and educated in Rhinebeck and then worked at a lumberyard in New York City.

Cole also supervised the building of a sugarcane mill in Cuba.

In 1854, he moved to St. Louis, Missouri, and lived there working in a lumberyard.

== Civil War ==
At the beginning of the American Civil War, Cole volunteered for the Union Army. He became the captain of Company A, 5th Missouri Volunteer Infantry (3 months, 1861). While in this organization, he was severely wounded at the Battle of Wilson's Creek on August 10, 1861. Cole then served as a captain in the 1st Missouri Volunteer Infantry Regiment (3 Years Organization).

He commanded Battery E, 1st Missouri Light Artillery at the Siege of Vicksburg.

He was promoted to major on August 12, 1863, and to lieutenant colonel on October 4, 1863.

In 1863, Cole was promoted to colonel of the 2nd Missouri Light Artillery Regiment.

== Indian Wars ==
At the end of the Civil War in 1865, Cole and eight batteries of his 2nd Missouri Artillery were sent to Omaha, Nebraska. There, he assumed command of the right, or eastern, column of the Powder River Expedition, which was to be a military expedition against the Sioux and Cheyenne Indians in the Montana and Dakota Territories.

Cole's column, which mainly consisted of cavalry and mounted artillery, started northwest on July 1, and crossed through present-day Nebraska and South Dakota, before reaching the Powder River in Montana in late August 1865. At that time, Cole's men were low on supplies, and on September 1, they began skirmishing with Indian warriors who attacked the column.

In early September, Cole began a withdrawal toward Fort Laramie, and was forced to abandon his wagons after hundreds of the columns' horses died, fighting the Powder River Battles along the way. The other columns encountered similar results, and the Powder River Expedition was deemed a failure.

On November 18, 1865, Cole was mustered out of the Union Army.

== Later life ==
Cole moved back to St. Louis and continued in the lumber business, eventually owning a planing mill.

In 1868, with his business partner, Stephen Glass, Cole opened the Cole and Glass Manufacturing Company.

Cole served on the St. Louis Board of Aldermen for six years, and was also a commissioner for the city's Lafayette Park.

== Spanish–American War service ==
In May 1898, after the outbreak of the Spanish–American War, Cole was commissioned a brigadier general in the United States Army by President William McKinley, and he applied for active service in Cuba or the Philippines. He was instead assigned to command the 3rd Brigade, 2nd Division, Second Army Corps. The brigade was composed of four volunteer infantry regiments, the 1st Rhode Island Volunteer Infantry, 1st Delaware Volunteer Infantry, 2nd Tennessee Volunteer Infantry, and the 3rd Missouri Volunteer Infantry; it saw no action in the war. During the winter of 1898–99, while in command of his brigade at Columbia, South Carolina, Cole developed a serious cold. He was mustered out of the service of the United States for the last time in March 1899.

== Death ==
Cole died from complications of his illness on July 31, 1899, in St. Louis. He is buried in the Bellefontain Cemetery, in north St. Louis.
