= Samuel Walker (soldier) =

American politician

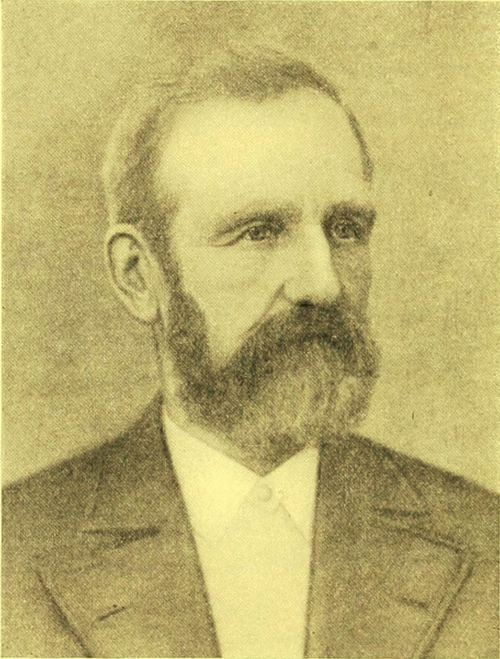
- Born: October 19, 1822; Franklin County, Pennsylvania
- Died: February 6, 1893 (aged 70); Lawrence, Kansas
- Burial place: Oak Hill Cemetery, Lawrence
- Spouse: Marian E. Lowe
- Military career
- Allegiance: United States of America
- Branch: United States Army; Union Army
- Service years: 1855–1861 (Kansas Militia); 1861–1865 (USA); 1865–1875 (Kansas Militia)
- Rank: Lieutenant Colonel (USV); Brevet Brig. General (USV); Major General (Militia)
- Units: 1st Kansas Volunteer Infantry; 5th Kansas Volunteer Cavalry
- Commands: 4th Kansas Cavalry (Militia); 16th Kansas Volunteer Cavalry; Kansas State Militia
- Conflicts: Bleeding Kansas: Fort Titus; American Civil War: Wilson's Creek; Price's Raid; American Indian Wars: Sioux Wars; Powder River Expedition; Powder River Battles
- Other work: Lawman, Politician

Samuel Walker (not to be confused with Samuel Hamilton Walker) (October 19, 1822 – February 6, 1893) was an American soldier, lawman and politician who settled in Lawrence, Kansas, and served as an officer during Bleeding Kansas and the American Civil War.

== Early life ==
Walker was born on October 19, 1822, in Franklin County, Pennsylvania. After marrying Marian E. Lowe in 1842, Walker moved to Ohio in 1848, and worked there as a cabinet maker. In 1855 he settled permanently in Lawrence, Kansas. There Walker became a founding member of the Bloomington Guards, a local militia company, in late 1855, and he was quickly elected first sergeant. In the following year Walker was elected colonel of the 4th Kansas Cavalry, which participated in all the campaigns of the free-state men during Bleeding Kansas. In that capacity Walker was present at the sieges of Lawrence and Fort Saunders, and commanded free-state forces on August 16, 1856, at the Battle of Fort Titus, which was a free-state victory. In 1856 Walker served as a member of the short-lived Territorial House of Representatives under the Topeka Constitution, and around the same time he also was a Deputy U.S. Marshal. Walker became the sheriff of Douglas County, Kansas, in October 1857 and served until January 1862.

== Civil War ==
After the American Civil War began in April 1861, Walker volunteered to fight for the Union, and he was commissioned the captain of Company F, 1st Kansas Volunteer Infantry Regiment on June 1, 1861. In this capacity, Walker commanded the company at the Battle of Wilson's Creek, Missouri on August 10, 1861, where his regiment sustained over 50% casualties. Walker was promoted to a major of the 5th Kansas Volunteer Cavalry Regiment on May 24, 1862, before being promoted lieutenant colonel of the 16th Kansas Volunteer Cavalry Regiment in October 1864. Walker participated in opposing Price's Raid in Missouri and Kansas during the fall of 1864. In the wave of mass promotions by brevet at the war's end, he received brevet promotions to colonel and brigadier general dated to March 13, 1865.

== The Powder River Expedition ==
In mid 1865, Major General Grenville M. Dodge ordered an expedition as a punitive campaign against the Sioux, Cheyenne and Arapaho. Led by Brigadier General Patrick E. Connor, its strategy was to have three independently marching columns of soldiers converge upon the Sioux and Cheyenne in the Powder River Country. Walker was assigned command of the middle, or center column. The column was made up of eight companies of his own 16th Kansas Cavalry joined by Company H of the 15th Kansas Cavalry with two mountain howitzer cannon. He had an aggregate force of 600 mounted men. The column started north from Fort Laramie in early August 1865 and traversed the country west of the Black Hills in Dakota Territory. Marching into Montana Territory, the command suffered from bad water, weather, supply shortages, and harassing Indian attacks. Though the western column led by Connor was able to construct Fort Connor (later renamed Fort Reno), the army was neither able to defeat the Indians nor to pacify the region. All of the forces in the field were recalled to Fort Laramie, and the 16th Kansas Cavalry along with Colonel Walker were mustered out in December 1865.

== Later life ==
In 1865, Walker was named Major General of the Kansas Militia, and he held this rank for ten years. Walker served as the sheriff of Douglas County again, from 1868 to 1872, and as a City Marshall, to which he was elected in 1872. He was also a Republican in the State Senate from 1872 until 1874. Samuel Walker died on February 6, 1893, in Lawrence, Kansas, and is buried there in Oak Hill Cemetery.

== See also ==
- Powder River Expedition

== Notes ==
Political offices
Preceded by None	Member of the Kansas Territorial House of Representatives (Topeka Constitution); 1856	Unknown
Preceded by J.C. Vincent & L.J. Worden	Member of the Kansas State Senate for the 19th Senatorial District; 1872–1874; Served alongside: M.A. O'Neal	Succeeded by Henry Bronson & J.C. Vincent
