= 16th Kansas Cavalry Regiment =

16th Kansas Volunteer Cavalry Regiment
- Active: November 1863 – December 6, 1865
- Country: United States
- Allegiance: Union
- Branch: Cavalry
- Engagements: American Civil War: Price's Raid; Second Battle of Lexington; Battle of Little Blue River; Battle of Byram's Ford; Battle of Westport; Battle of Marais des Cygnes; Battle of Mine Creek; Battle of Marmiton River; Second Battle of Newtonia; American Indian Wars: Powder River Expedition; Powder River Battles

The 16th Kansas Volunteer Cavalry Regiment was a cavalry regiment that served in the Union Army during the American Civil War and American Indian Wars.

== Service ==
The 16th Kansas Volunteer Cavalry Regiment was organized at Leavenworth, Kansas from November 1863 through May 1864. It mustered in for three years under the command of Colonel Werter R. Davis. The regiment was attached to District of Kansas, Department of Missouri, to April 1865. District of the Plains, Department of Missouri, to December 1865. The 16th Kansas Cavalry mustered out of service on December 6, 1865.

== Detailed service ==
Duty in the District of North Kansas at Fort Leavenworth until September 1864. Company D at Fort Scott, 1st Brigade, District South Kansas. Companies A and L at Paola, 2nd Brigade, District South Kansas. Company B at Shawnee Mission and Company C at Olathe, 2nd Brigade, District of South Kansas. Companies F and G at Lawrence August 1864. Action at Ridgley, Missouri, June 11, 1864 (Company E). Scout from Leavenworth to Weston, Missouri, June 13–16, and from Kansas into Missouri June 16–29. Camden Point July 13 (Company F). Near Lexington October 17 (Company H). Second Battle of Lexington October 19. Operations against Price's Raid. Battle of Little Blue River October 21. Pursuit of Price October 21–28. Independence and State Line October 22. Big Blue and Westport October 23. Mine Creek, Little Osage River and Marias Des Cygnes October 25. Battle of Charlot October 25. Mound City and Fort Lincoln October 25 (Companies A and D). Second Battle of Newtonia October 28. Operations on Upper Arkansas January 28-February 9, 1865. Protecting country against Indians until June. Powder River Expedition, march from Fort Laramie, Dakota Territory to the Powder River then to Fort Connor, July 11 - September 20. Actions with Indians September 1–10 on Powder River. Mustered out December 6, 1865.

== Casualties ==
The regiment lost a total of 110 men during service; 1 officer and 10 enlisted men killed or mortally wounded, 1 officer and 98 enlisted men died of disease.

== Field Officers ==
- Colonel Werter R. Davis
- Lieutenant Colonel Samuel Walker
- Major James A. Price
- Major James Ketner
- Major Clarkson Reynolds
- Major Wilber F. Woodworth

== See also ==
- List of Kansas Civil War Units
- Kansas in the Civil War
