= Powder River Expedition (1865) =

US operation against American Indians

- Part of the Sioux Wars, American Indian Wars
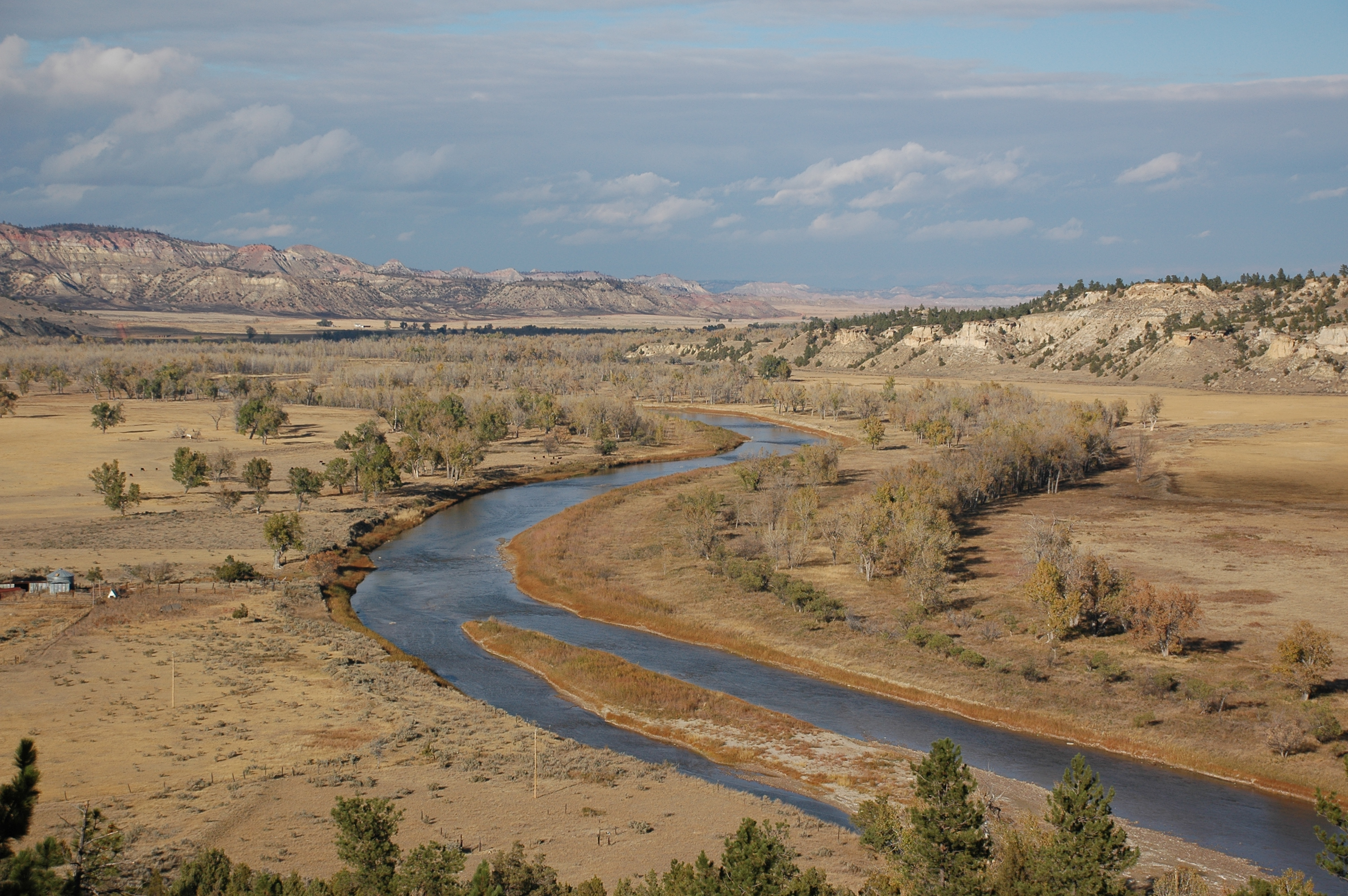
- The Powder River in southeastern Montana where Cole's and Walker's columns passed in 1865.
Date	July 1 to October 4, 1865
Location	Powder River Country, Montana, Wyoming, South Dakota, and Nebraska, United States
Result	Stalemate

Belligerents
United States	Sioux; Cheyenne; Arapaho

Commanders and leaders
(United States) Patrick E. Connor (United States) Nelson D. Cole (United States) Samuel Walker (United States) Frank North	Red Cloud; Sitting Bull; Roman Nose; Little Wolf; George Bent

Strength
2,600 soldiers 179 Indian scouts 195 civilians	~2,000 warriors

Casualties and losses
31 killed 19 wounded	68–96+ killed 14+ wounded 18 captured (including women and children)

This event should not be confused with the Big Horn Expedition during the Black Hills War.

The Powder River Expedition of 1865, also known as the Powder River War or Powder River Invasion, was a large and far-flung military operation of the United States Army against the Lakota Sioux, Cheyenne, and Arapaho Indians in Montana Territory and Dakota Territory. Although soldiers destroyed one Arapaho village and established Fort Connor to protect gold miners on the Bozeman Trail, the expedition is considered a failure because it failed to defeat or intimidate the Indians.

== Background ==
The Sand Creek massacre of Cheyenne people on November 29, 1864 intensified Indian reprisals and raids in the Platte River valley. (See Battle of Julesburg) After the raids, several thousand Sioux, Cheyenne and Arapaho congregated in the Powder River country, remote from white settlements and confirmed as Indian territory in the 1851 Treaty of Fort Laramie.

The Indians perceived the Bozeman Trail, blazed in 1863 through the heart of their country, as a threat. Although roads through the Indian territory were permitted by the Fort Laramie Treaty, they harassed miners and other travelers along the trail. At the Battle of Platte Bridge in July 1865, over a thousand warriors attacked a bridge across the North Platte River and succeeded in temporarily shutting down travel on both the Bozeman and Oregon Trails. After the battle, the Indians broke up into small groups and dispersed for their summer buffalo hunt. A weakness of Indian warfare was that they lacked the resources to keep an army in the field for an extended period of time.

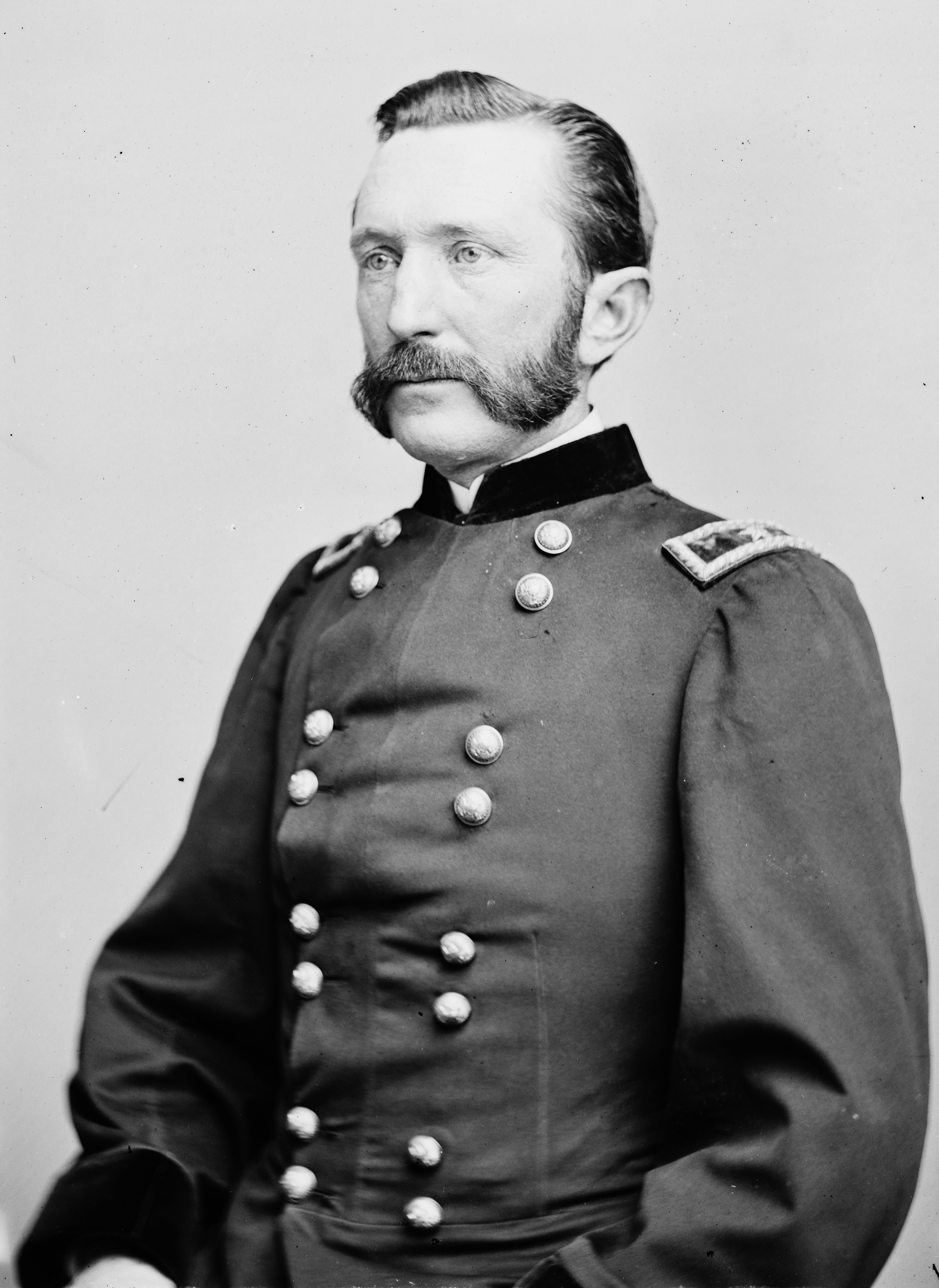
Brigadier General Patrick E. Connor

Major General Grenville M. Dodge ordered the Powder River Expedition as a punitive campaign against the northern plains tribes in the heart of their territory. Brigadier General Patrick E. Connor was chosen to lead the expedition. Dodge ordered Connor to "make vigorous war upon the Indians and punish them so that they will be forced to keep the peace." The campaign was one of the last Indian wars campaigns carried out by United States Volunteers.

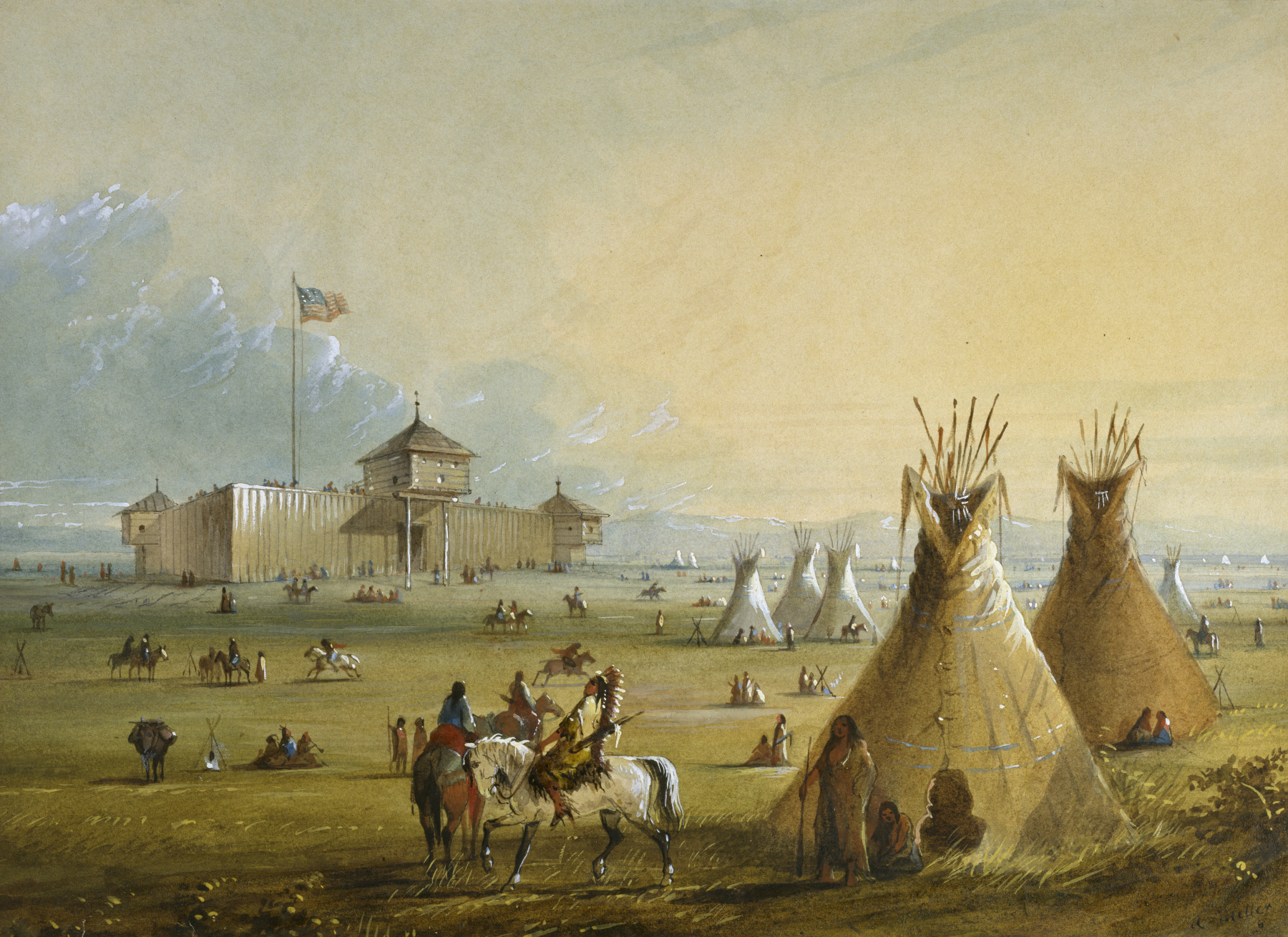
Fort Laramie was Connor's and Walker's starting point for the expedition. Plains Indians often visited and camped near the Fort.

Connor's strategy was for three columns of soldiers to march into the Powder River Country. The "Right column", composed of 1,400 Missourians and 140 wagons commanded by Colonel Nelson D. Cole, was to march from Omaha, Nebraska and follow the Loup River westward to the Black Hills, meeting up with Connor near the Powder River. The "Center Column", consisting of 600 Kansas cavalrymen led by Lieutenant Colonel Samuel Walker, was to head north from Fort Laramie and traverse the country west of the Black Hills. The "Left" and "West" Columns of nearly 1,000 men, personally commanded by Connor and composed of soldiers from California, Iowa, Michigan, Missouri, and Ohio, along with Indian scouts and a wagon train, would move toward the Powder River with the goal of establishing a fort near the Bozeman trail. All three columns were to unite at the new fort.

Connor's orders to his commanders were as follows, "You will not receive overtures of peace or submission from Indians, but will attack and kill every male Indian over twelve years of age." Connor's superiors, Generals John Pope and Dodge attempted to countermand this order, but it was too late, as the three columns had already departed and were out of contact.

The expedition was troubled from the start. The number of men to be involved in the campaign was reduced from 12,000 to less than 3,000 because many soldiers were mustered out of the army at the end of the American Civil War. The remaining volunteers were "mutinous, dissatisfied, and inefficient." The companies of the 6th Michigan Volunteer Cavalry Regiment commanded by Colonel James H. Kidd had recently been transferred from the Civil War battlefields of Virginia, and most of Cole's and Walker's men had been active in the Western Theater during the last years of the war. Few of the men and officers had any experience fighting Indians or traveling on the Great Plains. Procuring supplies was also a problem.

== Connor's expedition ==
Brigadier General Patrick E. Connor and nearly 1,000 soldiers, Indian scouts, and civilian teamsters, along with a wagon train full of supplies, left Fort Laramie, Dakota Territory beginning on July 30, 1865, to unite with Cole's and Walker's columns. One of his guides was mountain man Jim Bridger. Connor's column proceeded northward, and in August established Fort Connor on the upper Powder River.

=== Crazy Woman's Fork ===
On August 13, 1865, Captain Frank J. North of the Pawnee Scouts was riding with some of his men near the Crazy Woman's Fork of the Powder River. North and his scouts spotted a small group of Cheyenne warriors, and commenced a chase. During the pursuit, North became separated from his men by about a mile, and the retreating warriors turned on him. One of the Cheyennes wounded North's horse, and the Captain got behind the downed animal and used it as a barricade, from which position he fought off his attackers. Scout Bob White came upon North and joined him in the fight. Several more Pawnees arrived, and the small party then shot and wounded several of the warriors who then quickly fled. The fight at Crazy Woman's Fork was the first engagement of the Powder River Expedition.

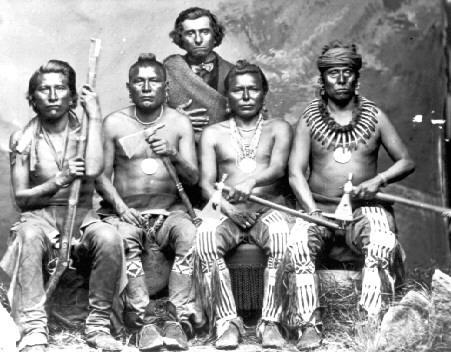
Four of the Pawnee Scouts

=== Powder River Massacre ===
For two days, Captain North and his Pawnee Scouts trailed a band of Cheyennes who were heading north. The trail showed that the Cheyennes had about 40 horses and mules, along with one travoi carrying a wounded warrior. At 2:00 a.m. on August 16, 1865, the Captain and his Scouts caught up with the group on the Powder River about 50 miles north of Fort Connor. The Cheyennes had made their camp for the night and were asleep, and North decided to wait until dawn to attack. In the morning, his group closed in on the camp. Spotting the scouts, the Cheyennes mistook North's party for friendly Cheyennes, and made no hostile moves. Then, the Pawnees suddenly charged in on the surprised Cheyennes, quickly killing all 24, including Yellow Woman, the stepmother of George Bent. The Pawnees lost 4 horses, but captured 18 horses and 17 mules, many with government brands showing they had been captured in the recent battles at Red Buttes and Platte Bridge Station on July 26.

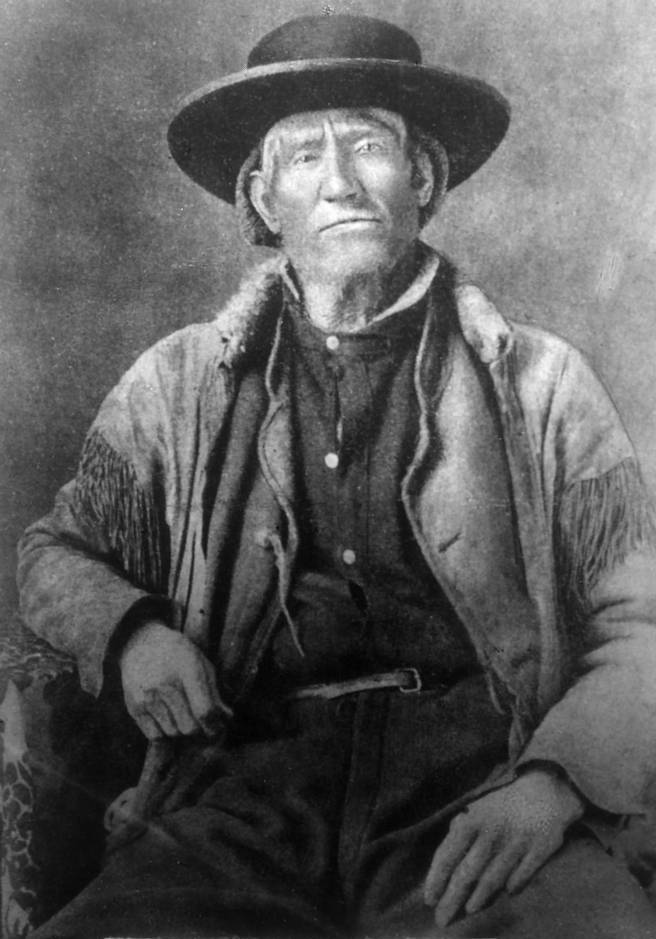
The mountain man Jim Bridger was a guide for Connor during his Powder River Expedition

=== The Battle of Tongue River ===
Connor marched north from Fort Connor, and on August 28, his Pawnee scouts discovered an Arapaho village of about 600 people encamped on the Tongue River. The next day, August 29, Connor attacked the village, whose leader was Black Bear, with 215 California, Iowa, and Ohio cavalrymen and over 80 Pawnee, Omaha, and Winnebago Scouts. The people in the village were primarily women, children, and old men. Most of the warriors were absent, engaged in a war with the Crow on the Bighorn River. The surprised Indians fled the village, but regrouped and counterattacked, and Connor was dissuaded from further pursuit. The soldiers destroyed the village, captured about 500 horses, and 8 women and 13 children who were subsequently released. Conner claimed to have killed 63 Arapaho warriors, a probably exaggerated estimate, at a cost to himself of 2 killed and five wounded. He then marched north on the Tongue River into southern Montana Territory before returning to Fort Connor, harassed by the Arapaho en route. The Arapaho, who had not been overly hostile before, now joined the Sioux and Cheyenne.

== Sawyers' expedition ==
Meanwhile, an expedition commanded by Lieutenant Colonel James A. Sawyers consisting of train of 80 wagons, engineers, supplies, and escorting soldiers of Companies C and D of the 5th U.S. Volunteer Infantry was traveling toward the Powder River with plans to continue on to Montana. Sawyers' group was to construct a new road for the use of emigrants to the Montana gold fields.

=== The Battle of Bone Pile Creek ===
On August 13, 1865, the soldiers, civilians, and wagon train of the Sawyers Expedition were moving west. The soldiers accompanying the train included a battalion of the 5th U.S. Volunteer Infantry, Companies C, and D, under the command of Captain George Williford. In the evening near Pumpkin Butte, Cheyenne and Sioux Native American Warriors attacked the train, killing Nathaniel Hedges, a 19-year-old civilian employee. Later in the evening of the thirteenth, the wagons were corralled near Bone Pile Creek, and Hedges was buried at the center of the corral. The next morning, the warriors returned and attacked again. The warriors again attacked the corralled wagons on the fifteenth, but they could not overtake the wagon train. Chief Red Cloud of the Sioux, and Dull Knife of the Cheyenne, accompanied by George Bent and his brother, Charles Bent, of the Cheyenne negotiated with Lieutenant Colonel Sawyers for a safe passage of the wagon train in exchange for one wagon's load of supplies. Soldiers of the 5th U.S. Volunteer Infantry reported that at this time that the Cheyenne warrior George Bent was dressed in a United States military uniform. (Bent later reported that he had captured a major's uniform coat during the sack of Julesburg in January 1865 and wore it throughout this campaign.) Sawyers agreed to give the supplies, which included a wagon full of sugar, bacon, coffee, flour, and tobacco. When the wagons began moving again, the Natives attacked again, killing Privates Anthony Nelson, and John Rawze. The soldiers fired back, killing two warriors, and the Native Americans quickly withdrew from the corralled wagons. After burying Private Nelson beside Nathaniel Hedges, and being unable to locate the body of Private Rawze, the Sawyers Expedition continued on.

=== Sawyers' fight ===
On September 1, 1865, Arapaho warriors, infuriated by the destruction of their village on the Tongue River, attacked Sawyers' wagon train, killing three men. Two of the Arapaho warriors were killed. The wagon train was held under virtual siege for two weeks when it was finally rescued by Connor's forces.

== Cole's and Walker's expeditions ==
=== The two columns set out ===
Colonel Nelson D. Cole left Omaha, Nebraska, on July 1, 1865, with over 1,400 Missourians and 140 wagon-loads of supplies. His column followed the Loup River upstream and then marched across country to Bear Butte in the Black Hills, arriving there on August 13, 1865. Cole's command, during the 560 miles (900 km) of traveling, suffered from thirst, diminishing supplies, and near mutinies. Lieutenant Colonel Samuel Walker and his 600 Kansas Cavalrymen left Fort Laramie, Dakota Territory on August 6, 1865, and met up with Cole's Expedition on August 19, 1865, near the Black Hills. He had likewise suffered from shortages of water, and had lost several of his soldiers of the 16th Regiment Kansas Volunteer Cavalry from bad water. The two columns marched separately, but remained in contact as they moved west to Powder River in Montana Territory. By this time, some of the men were barefooted and many of the horses and mules were growing weak.

=== March on Powder River ===
On the morning of September 1, 1865, the over 1,400 United States soldiers and civilians, of Colonel Nelson D. Cole's column of the Powder River Expedition, were encamped on Alkali Creek, a tributary of the Powder River. This was in Montana Territory, in present-day Custer County, Montana. In the early morning, over 300 Hunkpapa, Sans Arc, and Miniconjou Lakota Sioux warriors attacked the camps' horse herd. The first of the soldiers to respond were seven men of Battery K, in the 2nd Missouri Light Artillery Regiment. Shortly after leaving the camp, warriors ambushed this party, and in the following battle, five of these seven soldiers became casualties, with two killed, one mortally wounded, and two wounded. Later that night, two unknown U.S. soldiers in a hunting party were killed. The known Sioux Casualties during the battle of Alkali Creek, are four unknown warriors killed, and four unknown warriors wounded.

On the next day, Saturday, September 2, 1865, there were at least three small skirmishes with warriors. In the first, at least one warrior was killed in the fight. In the second, no casualties were reported. In the third, later in the day, two soldiers were killed, while returning to camp after a hunting trip. In desperate need of supplies, Colonel Cole and Walker decided to follow Powder River north, to search for Brigadier General Patrick E. Connor's column, and his wagon train. The expeditions continued north to the mouth of Mizpah Creek in Custer County, Montana. There, the two Colonels decided to turn back around and retrace their steps south up the Powder River, to search for Connor's left column. The Indians attacked again on September 4 and 5, 1865, in present-day Custer County, Montana. They continued to harass Cole and Walker as the soldiers moved south up Powder River.

On September 8, 1865, the over 2,000 United States soldiers and civilians of Colonel Cole's and Walker's column's were marching South, up Powder River in Montana Territory. Unbeknownst to them, a village of Over 2,500 Cheyenne, Sioux, and Arapaho including the Cheyenne chief Roman Nose, were camped less than ten miles away. When discovering this, the Cheyenne, Sioux, and Arapaho warriors, not wanting the soldiers to attack their village, attacked the soldiers first. The soldiers' lead guard, was marching about one quarter of a mile ahead of the column. This command was hit first. Out of the 25 men of the lead guard, two men became casualties. After seeing this first confrontation, Lieutenant Colonel Walker sent a courier back to inform Colonel Cole of the attack. At the time, Cole was overseeing the crossing of his wagon train to the east bank of the Powder River. Cole ordered the train, out of the timber and corralled, and the 12th Missouri Cavalry to skirmish through the woods along the river bank, and to drive out a body of Indians in the woods. The soldiers pushed the warriors off the battlefield. Near the end of the engagement, another Private was wounded. At least one Native American was killed in the engagement. A snowstorm during the night of September 8–9, 1865, caused further problems for the soldiers, most of whom were now on foot, in rags, and reduced to eating raw horse meat.

On the morning of September 10, 1865, Cole's, and Walker's column's were encamped near the confluence of the Little Powder River and the Powder River when Native American warriors appeared. There were volleys and some sporadic firing. On September 11, there was more light skirmishing. On September 13, two scouts from Brigadier General Connor's column found Walker's and Cole's column's on Powder River and informed them of the newly established Fort Connor on Powder River east of Kaycee, Wyoming. Cole, Walker and their soldiers arrived there on September 20, 1865. Connor deemed the soldiers unfit for further service and sent them back to Fort Laramie where most of them were mustered out of the army.

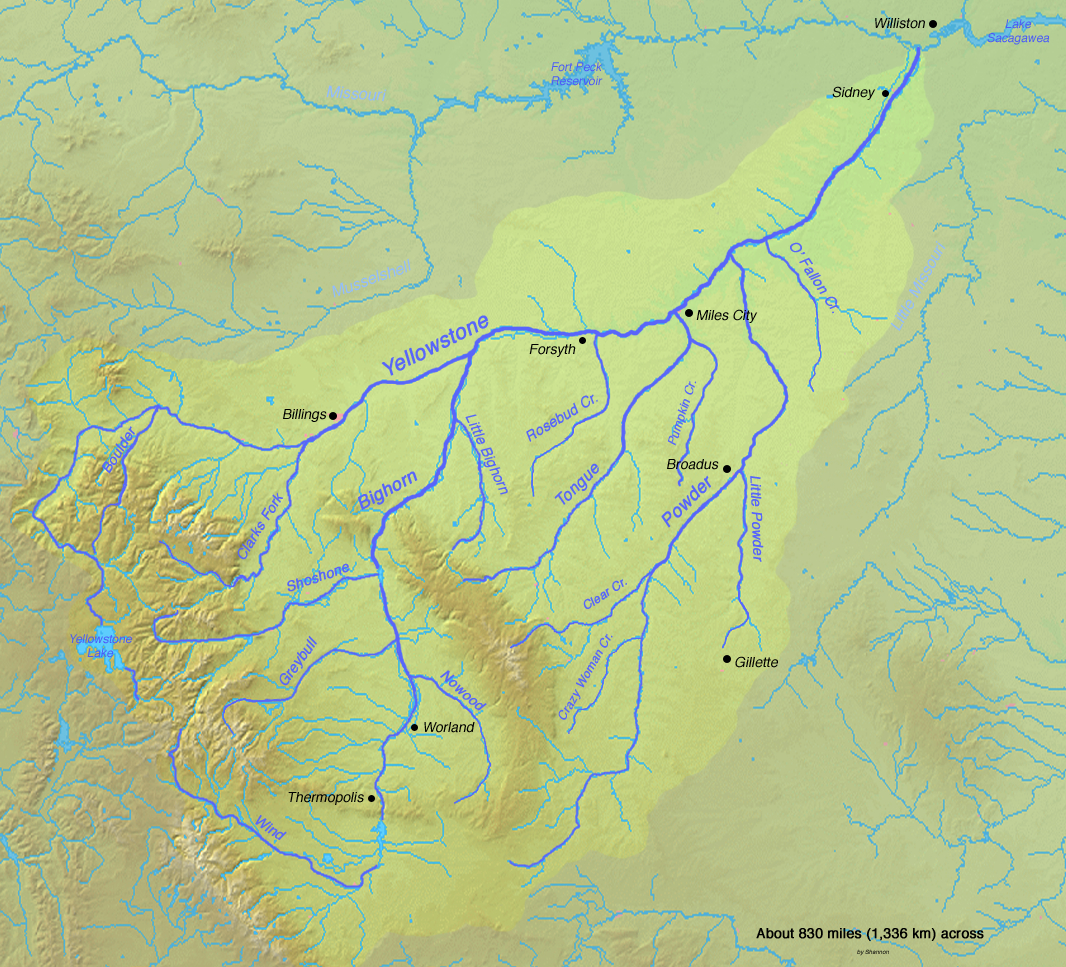
The soldiers in the Powder River Expedition followed Powder River from near its mouth to its headwaters.

== Casualties ==
Connor, Cole, Walker, and Sawyers sustained a combined total loss of 31 killed and 19 wounded. Cole claimed that his soldiers had killed two hundred Indians. By contrast, Walker said, "I cannot say as we killed one." Connor's command inflicted most of the 68-96 or more natives killed, 14 or more wounded, and 18 Arapaho captured.

== Aftermath ==
Connor finally united all the components of his expedition on September 24, 1865, at Fort Connor. However, orders transferring him to Utah were awaiting him when he arrived there. The 16th Kansas Volunteer Cavalry remained to staff Fort Connor and all other troops withdrew to Fort Laramie, most to be mustered out of the army.

Although achieving some successes, the expedition failed to defeat decisively or intimidate the Indians. The Cheyenne warrior, George Bent, a participant in the fighting on September 8, stated that the Lakota would have annihilated Cole's and Walker's columns had they possessed more good firearms. Indian resistance to travelers on the Bozeman Trail became more determined than ever. "There will be no more travel on that road until the government takes care of the Indians," a correspondent wrote. The most important consequence of the expedition was to persuade the United States government that another effort to build and protect a wagon road from Fort Laramie to the gold fields in Montana was desirable. That conviction would lead to a renewed invasion of the Powder River country a year later and Red Cloud's War in which the Sioux, Cheyenne, and Arapaho would emerge victorious.

== Officers accompanying the Powder River Expedition ==
=== Headquarters ===
- Brigadier General Patrick E. Connor, Commanding.
- Captain C. J. Laurant, Assistant Adjutant General, Headquarters.
- Captain Samuel Robbins, Chief Engineer, 1st Colorado Cavalry.
- Captain Henry E. Palmer, Quartermaster, 11th Kansas Cavalry.
- Captain William H. Tubbs, Acting Commissary of Subsistence, Headquarters.
- Second Lieutenant Oscar Jewett, Aide-de-camp to Connor, Headquarters (Wounded in action).

=== Right Column ===
- Colonel Nelson D. Cole, Headquarters, 2nd Missouri Artillery.
- Colonel Oliver Wells, Headquarters, 12th Missouri Cavalry.
- Major (retired) Lyman G. Bennett, Chief Engineer, 4th Arkansas Cavalry.
- Major Clemenz Landgraeber, Headquarters, 2nd Missouri Artillery.
- Surgeon George Washington Corey, Headquarters, 12th Missouri Cavalry.
- Captain McMurray, Headquarters, 2nd Missouri Artillery.
- Captain Samuel Flagg, Battery B, 2nd Missouri Artillery.
- Captain Jefferson Miller, Battery E, 2nd Missouri Artillery.
- Captain William C. F. Montgomery, Battery H, 2nd Missouri Artillery.
- Captain Edward S. Rowland, Battery K, 2nd Missouri Artillery.
- Captain Charles H. Thurber, Battery L, 2nd Missouri Artillery.
- Captain Napoleon Boardman, Battery M, 2nd Missouri Artillery.
- First Lieutenant John H. Kendall, Battery L, 2nd Missouri Artillery.
- First Lieutenant Charles H. Springer, Company B, 12th Missouri Cavalry.
- First Lieutenant William Rinne, Battery C, 2nd Missouri Artillery.
- Second Lieutenant Frederick J. Amsden, U.S. Signal Corps, Department of the Missouri.
- Second Lieutenant George R. Thorne, Acting Assistant Quartermaster
- Second Lieutenant William T. Shaver, Headquarters, 12th Missouri Cavalry.
- Second Lieutenant Hiram L. Kelly, Battery A, 2nd Missouri Artillery (Wounded in action).
- Second Lieutenant Philip Smiley, Battery H, 2nd Missouri Artillery.
- Second Lieutenant Abram S. Hoagland, Battery K, 2nd Missouri Artillery.
- Second Lieutenant James A. Ferren, Battery K, 2nd Missouri Artillery.

=== Central Column ===
- Brevet Brigadier General, Lieutenant Colonel Samuel Walker, Headquarters, 16th Kansas Cavalry.
- Major Clarkson Reynolds, Headquarters, 16th Kansas Cavalry.
- Surgeon James P. Earickson, Headquarters, 16th Kansas Cavalry (Died at Fort Connor).
- Captain Oscar F. Dunlap, Company H, 15th Kansas Cavalry.
- First Lieutenant R. M. Fisk, Company H, 15th Kansas Cavalry.
- First Lieutenant James L. Walker, Company D, 16th Kansas Cavalry.
- First Lieutenant Wesley T. Smith, Company H, 16th Kansas Cavalry
- Second Lieutenant Charles Balance, Company F, 16th Kansas Cavalry.
- Second Lieutenant Edward Gill, Company H, 15th Kansas Cavalry.
- Second Lieutenant Francis E. Smith, Company H, 15th Kansas Cavalry.

=== Left Column ===
- Colonel James H. Kidd, Headquarters, 6th Michigan Cavalry.
- Captain Frank North, Company A, Pawnee Indian Scouts.
- Captain Albert Brown, Company M, 2nd California Cavalry.
- Captain Osmer F. Cole, Company G, 6th Michigan Cavalry (Killed in action).
- Captain George Conrad, Company L, 2nd California Cavalry.
- Captain Jacob L. Humphreyville, Company K, 11th Ohio Cavalry.
- Captain Levi G. Marshall, Company E, 11th Ohio Cavalry.
- Captain Edwin R. Nash, Company A, Omaha/Winnebago Indian Scouts.
- Captain Nicholas J. O'Brien, Company F, 7th Iowa Cavalry.
- First Lieutenant John S. Brewer, Company F, 7th Iowa Cavalry.
- First Lieutenant Michael Evans, Company A, Omaha/Winnebago Indian Scouts.
- First Lieutenant Charles A. Small, Company A, Pawnee Indian Scouts.
- Second Lieutenant Joseph Willard Brown, U.S. Signal Corps, Department of the Missouri.
- Second Lieutenant Gavin Mitchell, Company A, Omaha/Winnebago Indian Scouts.
- Second Lieutenant James Murie, Company A, Omaha/Winnebago Indian Scouts.
- Second Lieutenant Alonzo V. Richards, U.S. Signal Corps, Department of the Missouri.
- Second Lieutenant Eugene Fitch Ware, Company F, 7th Iowa Cavalry.

== Order of battle ==
United States Army

Division	Column	Regiments and Others
Powder River Expedition, Brigadier General Patrick Edward Connor, commanding.	Left, Western Column Colonel James H. Kidd	2nd California Volunteer Cavalry Regiment, (Companies L and M, 105 men): Captain George Conrad, Captain Albert Brown; 6th Michigan Volunteer Cavalry Regiment, (4 Companies including Company F, ~200 men): Colonel James H. Kidd; 7th Iowa Volunteer Cavalry Regiment, (Company F, 88 men): Captain Nicholas J. O'Brien; 11th Ohio Volunteer Cavalry Regiment, (Companies E and K, 127-130 men): Captain Levi G. Marshall, Captain Jacob L. Humphreyville; 2nd Missouri Volunteer Light Artillery Regiment, (Detachment, 14 men); Pawnee Scouts (95 men): Captain Frank J. North; Omaha and Winnebago Scouts (84 men): Captain Edwin R. Nash; 195 Civilian Wagon Train Employees: Chief Wagon Train Master Robert Wheeling; Civilian Guides: Jim Bridger; Mountain Howitzer Section, (2 Cannon): Captain Nicholas J. O'Brien; United States Signal Corps, (Detachment, 15 men): Second Lieutenant Joseph W. Brown, Second Lieutenant Alonzo V. Richards
Powder River Expedition, Brigadier General Patrick Edward Connor, commanding.	Central, Middle Column Lieutenant Colonel Samuel Walker	15th Kansas Volunteer Cavalry Regiment (Company H, ~50 men): Second Lieutenant Edward Gill; 16th Kansas Volunteer Cavalry Regiment (Companies A, B, C, D, E, F, G, H, I, K and L, ~550 men): Lieutenant Colonel Samuel Walker; Mountain Howitzer Section, (2 Cannon), manned by men from Company H, 15th Kansas Cavalry and Company M, 16th Kansas Cavalry: Second Lt Edward Gill
Powder River Expedition, Brigadier General Patrick Edward Connor, commanding.	Right, Eastern Column Colonel Nelson D. Cole	2nd Missouri Volunteer Light Artillery Regiment, (Batteries B, C, D, E, H, K, L, and M, 797 men): Colonel Nelson D. Cole; 12th Missouri Volunteer Cavalry Regiment, (Companies A, B, C, D, E, F, G, H, I, K, L, and M, 311 men): Colonel Oliver Wells; Ordinance Rifle Section (2 Cannon), (manned by men from 2nd Missouri Volunteer Light Artillery Regiment): United States Signal Corps, (Detachment, 7 men): Second Lieutenant Frederick J. Amsden

Native Americans

Native Americans	Tribe	Leaders
Native Americans	Sioux	Sitting Bull; Crazy Horse
Native Americans	Cheyenne	Roman Nose; Little Wolf; George Bent; Charlie Bent; Yellow Woman †; Red Bull †; Black Whetstone †
Native Americans	Arapaho	Black Bear; Medicine Man

== See also ==
- Red Cloud's War
- Black Hills War
