= Battery F, 2nd Missouri Light Artillery Regiment =

Battery F, 2nd Missouri Light Artillery Regiment Landgraber's Battery of Horse Artillery
- Active: September 1, 1861 to August 23, 1865
- Country: United States
- Allegiance: Union
- Branch: Artillery
- Engagements: Battle of Pea Ridge; Yazoo Pass Expedition; Battle of Chickasaw Bayou; Battle of Chickasaw Bluffs; Arkansas Post Expedition; Battle of Fort Hindman; Demonstrations at Haines & Snyder's Bluffs; Siege of Vicksburg Assaults May 19–22; Battle of Jackson, Mississippi; Chattanooga campaign Battle of Lookout Mountain; Battle of Missionary Ridge; Battle of Ringgold Gap; Battle of Taylor's Ridge; Relief of Knoxville; Battle of Resaca; Battle of Dallas; Battle of New Hope Church; Battle of Allatoona; Battle of Kennesaw Mountain; Battle of Nickajack Creek; Battle of Atlanta; Siege of Atlanta; Battle of Ezra Church; Battle of JonesboroughBattle of Lovejoy's Station; Pursuit of Hood

Battery F, 2nd Missouri Light Artillery Regiment was an artillery battery that served in the Union Army during the American Civil War. It was originally organized as Langraeber's Battery of Horse Artillery in St. Louis in the autumn of 1861. On September 30, "Langraeber's Battery" was assigned to the 2nd Missouri Light Artillery, as that regiment's Battery "F".

== Service ==
Organized at St. Louis, Mo., October 8, 1861. Also sometimes known as "Pfenninghaussen's Battery Light Artillery". Attached to Dept. of Missouri to January, 1862. 5th Brigade, Army of Southwest Missouri, Dept. of Missouri, to March, 1862. Artillery 2nd Division, Army of Southwest Missouri, Dept. of Missouri, to July, 1862. District of Eastern Arkansas, Dept. of Missouri, to December, 1862. 2nd Brigade, 11th Division, Dept. of the Tennessee, to December, 1862. 2nd Brigade, 4th Division, Sherman's Yazoo Expedition to January, 1863. Artillery 1st Division, 15th Army Corps, Army of the Tennessee, to September, 1863. Attached to 1st Division, 15th Army Corps, to November, 1864. Artillery Reserve, Nashville, Tenn., Dept. of the Cumberland, to March, 1865. 3rd Sub-District, District Middle Tennessee, Dept. Cumberland, to June, 1865. District St. Louis, Mo., to August, 1865.

== Detailed service ==
Duty in Southwest Missouri till January, 1862. Curtis' advance on Springfield, Mo., January 23-February 12. Pursuit of Price to Cassville, Missouri, February 13–16. Sugar Creek February 17. Battles of Pea Ridge, Ark., March 6–8. March to Batesville April 5-May 3, thence to Helena, Ark., May 25-July 14. Duty at Helena, Ark., till December. Sherman's Yazoo Expedition December 22, 1862, to January 3, 1863. Chickasaw Bayou December 26–28. Chickasaw Bluff December 29. Expedition to Arkansas Post, Ark., January 3–10, 1863. Assault and capture of Fort Hindman, Arkansas Post, January 10–11. Moved to Young's Point, La., January 17–23, and duty there till April. Expedition to Greenville, Black Bayou and Deer Creek April 4–14. Demonstrations on Haines' and Snyder's Bluffs April 29-May 2. Moved to Join army in rear of Vicksburg, Miss., May 2–14. Jackson, Miss., May 14. Siege of Vicksburg May 18-July 4. Assaults on Vicksburg May 19 and 22. Advance on Jackson, Miss., July 4–10. Siege of Jackson July 10–17. Bolton's Depot July 16. Briar Creek, near Canton, July 17. Canton July 18. At Big Black till September 22. Moved to Memphis, Tenn., September 22. Assigned to 2nd Missouri Light Artillery as Battery "F," September 30, 1863. March to Chattanooga, Tenn., October–November, 1863. Operations on Memphis & Charleston Railroad in Alabama October 20–29. Barton Station, Cane Creek and Dickson's Station, Ala., October 20. Cherokee Station October 21. Cane Creek October 26. Bear Creek, Tuscumbia, October 27. Cherokee Station October 29. Chattanooga-Ringgold Campaign November 23–27. Lookout Mountain November 23–24. Missionary Ridge November 25. Ringgold Gap, Taylor's Ridge, November 27. March to relief of Knoxville November 28-December 8. Garrison duty in Alabama till April, 1864. Atlanta (Ga.) Campaign May 1-September 8. Demonstrations on Resaca May 5–13. Near Resaca May 13. Battle of Resaca May 14–15. Advance on Dallas May 18–25. Battles about Dallas, New Hope Church and Allatoona Hills May 25-June 5. Operations about Marietta and against Kennesaw Mountain June 10-July 2. Assault on Kennesaw June 27. Nickajack Creek July 2–5. Chattahoochie River July 5–17. Battle of Atlanta July 22. Siege of Atlanta July 22-August 25. Ezra Chapel, July 28. Flank movement on Jonesboro August 25–30. Battle of Jonesboro August 31 September 1. Lovejoy Station September 2–6. Pursuit of Hood into Alabama October 1–26. Ordered to Chattanooga, Tenn., October 29. Duty at Chattanooga and Nashville, Tenn., with Reserve Artillery, till June, 1865. Moved to St. Louis, Mo., and duty there till August. Mustered out August 25, 1865.

== Commanders ==
- Captain Clemens Landgraeber

== See also ==
- 2nd Missouri Light Artillery Regiment
- Missouri Civil War Union units
- Missouri in the Civil War
