= 2nd Missouri Light Artillery Regiment =

- Active: September 16, 1861 to December 20, 1865
- Country: United States
- Allegiance: Union
- Branch: Artillery
- Engagements: American Civil War

The 2nd Missouri Light Artillery Regiment was an artillery regiment that served in the Union Army during the American Civil War.

== Service ==
Organized at St. Louis, Mo., as 1st Regiment, Missouri Artillery, U. S. Reserve Corps, September 16 to November 6, 1861. Designation changed to 2nd Missouri Artillery November 20, 1861, and assigned to duty in forts about St. Louis till September, 1863. Consolidated to a Battalion of 5 Companies September 29, 1863. Landgraeber's Battery, Horse Artillery, assigned as Company "F," September 30, 1863. Companies "C" and "D" form new Company "A." Company "B" retained its organization. Companies "I" and "H" form new Company "C." Companies "A," "F," "G" and "K" form new Company "D." Companies "E," "L" and "M" form new Company "E." Six new Batteries organized as follows: "G" at St. Louis November 15, 1863. "H" at Springfield, Mo., December 4, 1863. "I" at Springfield, Mo., December 29, 1863. "K" at Springfield, Mo., January 14, 1864. "L" at Sedalia, Mo., January 20, 1864 (formerly 1st Battery, Missouri State Militia), "M" at St. Louis February 15, 1864. (See the several Batteries for history.)

2nd Missouri Light Artillery Regiment

- Battery A
- Battery B
- Battery C
- Battery D
- Battery E
- Battery F
- Battery G
- Battery H
- Battery I
- Battery K
- Battery L
- Battery M

== Commanders ==
- Colonel Nelson D. Cole

== See also ==
- Missouri Civil War Union units
- Missouri in the Civil War
