= Fort Reno (Wyoming) =

- U.S. National Register of Historic Places
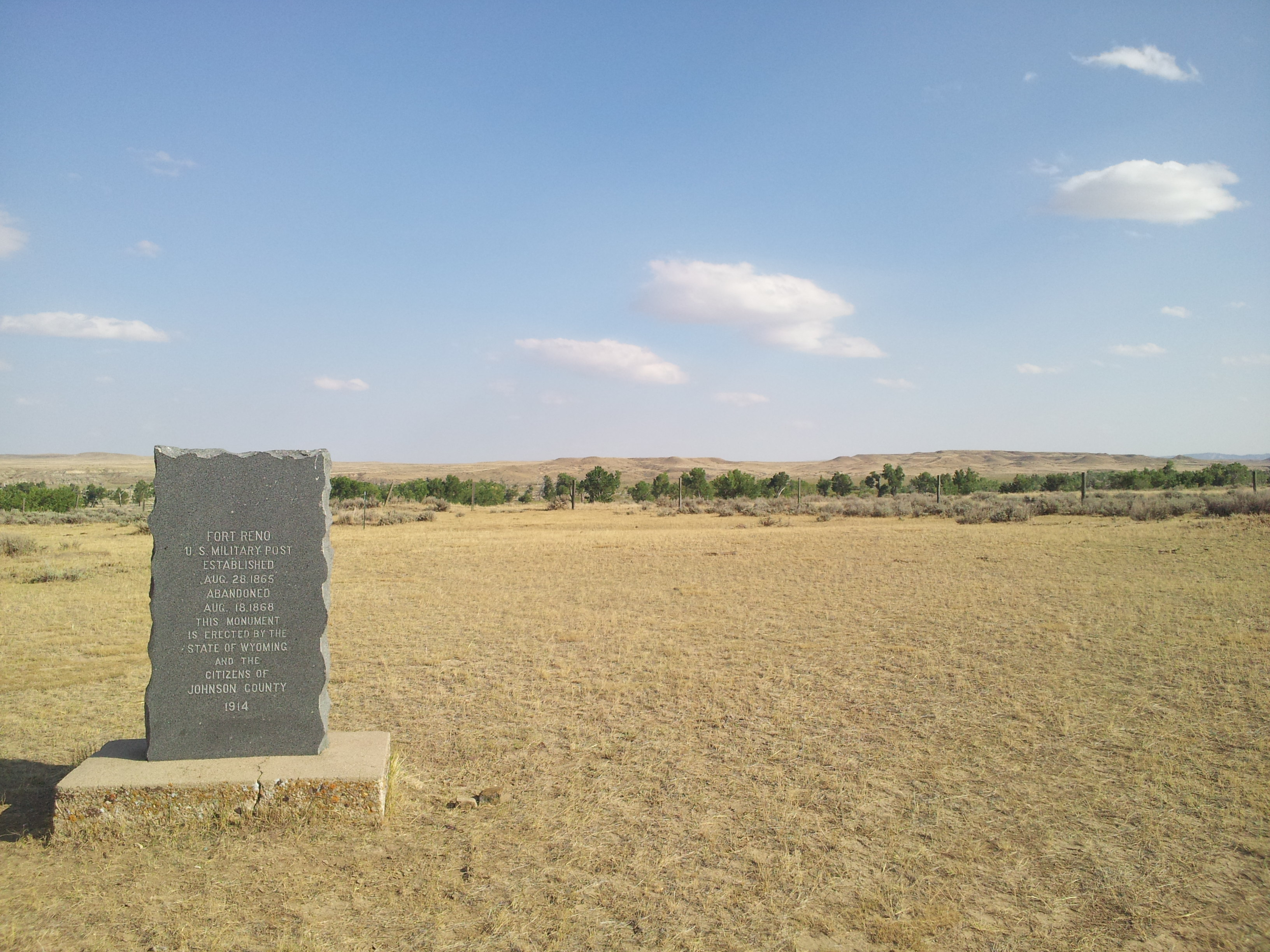
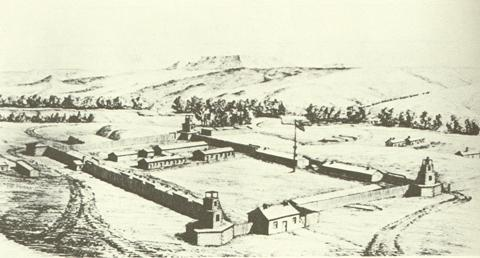
- Fort Reno and Powder River Old Fort Reno

- Location within Wyoming Location within the United States
- Location: Johnson County, East of Sussex on Powder River
- Nearest city: Sussex, Wyoming
- Coordinates: 43°49′39″N 106°14′24″W
- Built: 1865
- Architectural style: Fort
- NRHP reference No.: 70000672
- Added to NRHP: April 28, 1970

Fort Reno also known as Fort Connor or Old Fort Reno, was a wooden fort established on August 15, 1865, by the United States Army in Dakota Territory in present-day Johnson County, Wyoming. The fort was built to protect travelers on the Bozeman Trail from Native American tribes.

Today, the parade ground and surrounding area has generally returned to a natural prairie sod cover. The site, approximately 12 miles (19 km) northeast of Sussex, Wyoming, was listed on the National Register of Historic Places on March 28, 1970. There is a large stone monument and several interpretive signs marking the site that are accessible by a gravel road.

== Establishment ==
One of the primary goals of the Powder River Expedition of 1865 was to construct a fort on the Powder River in Montana Territory or Dakota Territory. The expedition's left, or western column of about 650 men under the command of Colonel James H. Kidd of the 6th Michigan Cavalry, accompanied by the expedition's overall commander Brigadier General Patrick E. Connor, set out from Fort Laramie, Dakota Territory on August 1, 1865.

Army units with the column included Companies L, and M, of the 2nd California Volunteer Cavalry Regiment, four Companies of the 6th Michigan Volunteer Cavalry Regiment, Companies E, and K, of the 11th Ohio Volunteer Cavalry Regiment, Company F, of the 7th Iowa Volunteer Cavalry Regiment, a detachment of the United States Signal Corps, the Pawnee Scouts and a section of two Model 1841 Mountain Howitzers manned by 14 soldiers of the 2nd Missouri Volunteer Light Artillery Regiment.

On August 15, 1865, Colonel Kidd's column selected the site of the fort on a bluff above the Powder River near the crossing of the Bozeman Trail. Construction began the same day by the four companies of the 6th Michigan Cavalry that had recently been transferred from the Army of the Potomac in Virginia. The new post was named Fort Connor in honor of Brigadier General Patrick Edward Connor, the overall commander of the Powder River Expedition. That month, Fort Connor was the jumping-off point for the soldiers that fought at the Battle of the Tongue River on August 29, 1865, in present-day Sheridan County, Wyoming. The left, right, and center columns of the Powder River Expedition all finally rendezvoused at Fort Connor on September 25, 1865. Army units that arrived in September included companies from the 2nd Missouri Volunteer Light Artillery Regiment, 12th Missouri Volunteer Cavalry Regiment, 15th Kansas Volunteer Cavalry Regiment, and the 16th Kansas Volunteer Cavalry Regiment, along with a second detachment of the U.S. Signal Corps. Most of these men marched south to Fort Laramie in October, 1865 to be mustered out of the army, leaving the four companies of Michigan cavalry under Colonel James H. Kidd to garrison the fort.

== Renaming ==
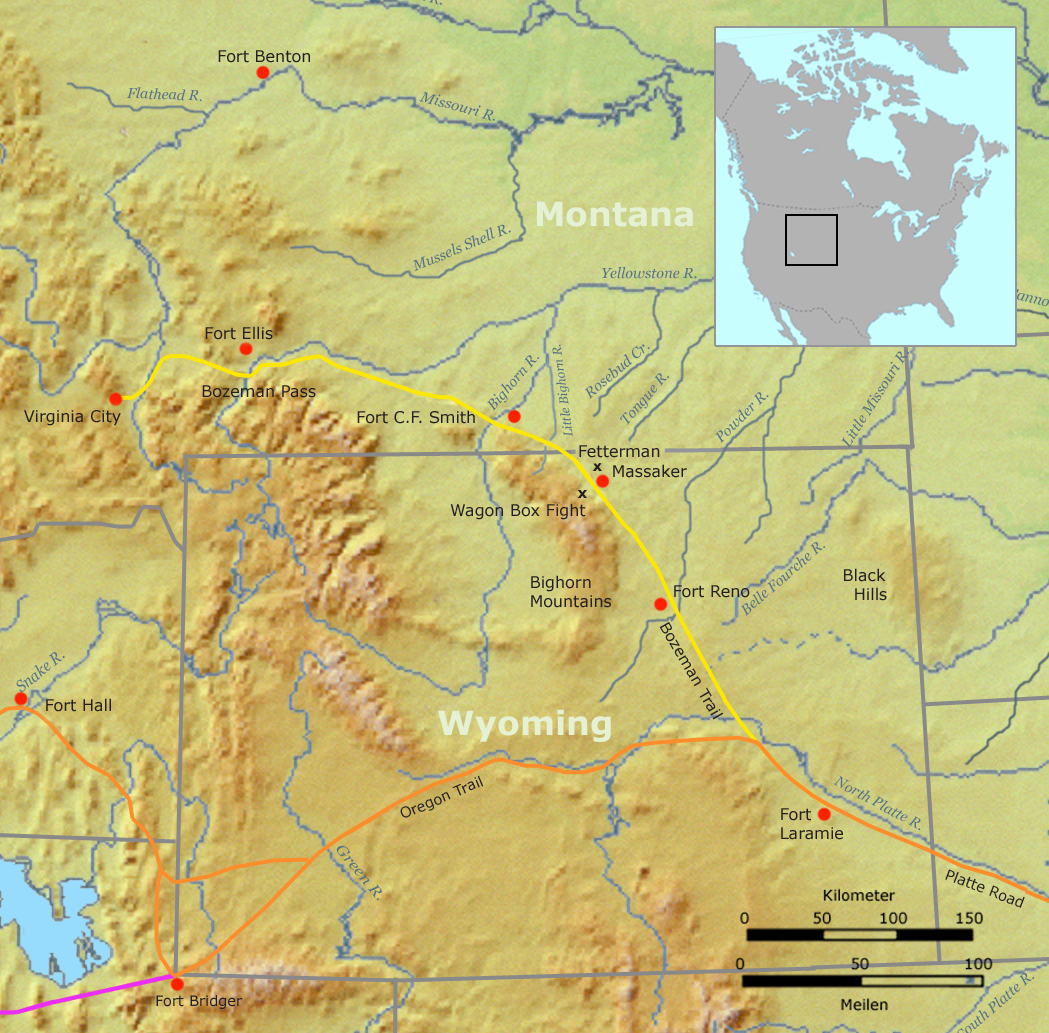
The Bozeman Trail with Fort Reno

The Bozeman Trail, built as a way around the Bighorn Mountains, crossed the Powder River at Fort Connor, offering emigrants traveling on it protection. Buildings constructed at Connor had sod-covered roofs and dirt floors. In October 1865, the 6th Michigan and Colonel Kidd turned the garrison of Fort Connor over to Captain George W. Williford, and Companies C, and D, of the 5th United States Volunteer Infantry Regiment, companies of the Galvanized Yankees, and a company of Indian scouts.

In November 1865, its name was changed to Fort Reno, in honor of Major General Jesse Lee Reno, who had been mortally wounded on September 14, 1862, at the Battle of South Mountain, Maryland, while commanding the Union IX Corps at Fox's Gap. The name had no connection with Major Marcus Reno, a member of the 7th Cavalry who fought in the Battle of the Little Bighorn. The garrison of the fort endured the harsh winter of 1865–1866, and during this time suffered 33 casualties from desertions, illnesses, one soldier killed by an accidental gunshot, and the death of its commanding officer, Captain George W. Williford, who died of illness on April 29, 1866. Captain George M. Bailey became Williford's successor.

== Reinforcement ==
On June 28, 1866 Colonel Henry Beebe Carrington and about 700 men of the 18th U.S. Infantry reached Fort Reno, relieving the galvanized yankees. The 18th Infantry had moved into the Powder River country to begin construction of posts (Fort Phil Kearny and Fort C. F. Smith) on the Bozeman trail farther to the north. When Carrington reached the post, only 104 of the original 137 men of Companies C, and D, 5th U.S.V.I. remained, the rest having died mainly of illness and scurvy. Colonel Carrington left Companies B, E, and H of the 18th Infantry to garrison the post, and resumed his march north on the Bozeman trail on July 9, 1866, while the 5th U.S.V.I. traveled south to Fort Kearney, Nebraska to muster out on October 11, 1866, "without a single regret."

The newly arrived Regular Army soldiers of the 18th Infantry constructed a log stockade around the unprotected garrison buildings, complete with log bastions on the northwest and southeast corners. They also built a sturdy adobe commanding officer's quarters. In 1867, the post was renovated and expanded. The garrison ranged from 125 to a high of 300 soldiers. The second battalion of the 18th Infantry, which was renamed the 27th United States Infantry Regiment in 1867, endured the routines of garrison life and the harsh winters and hot summers, occasionally skirmishing with hostile Indians and keeping the southern end of the Bozeman Trail open and passable.

== Abandonment ==
In 1868 the Fort Laramie Treaty ended Red Cloud's War and essentially ceded the Powder River Country to the Lakota Sioux. Along with Forts C.F. Smith and Phil Kearny, Fort Reno was abandoned as a condition of the agreement. Shortly after the military left in August, the entire post was destroyed by fire ignited by Cheyenne warriors. During the Great Sioux War, Brigadier General George Crook's 883 men of the Big Horn Expedition returned to Fort Reno in March, 1876, finding only some adobe walls and building debris. Nevertheless, Crook used the site as a supply base for 15 days, leaving the expedition's wagons and Companies C, and I, of the 4th United States Infantry Regiment, under the overall command of Captain Edwin M. Coates. On March 5 Crook's command fought Indian warriors in the Fort Reno Skirmish directly across the river from the abandoned post. Later that year, the army would again use the site as a supply base, eventually establishing the Fort Reno Depot several miles to the south. In the 1880s, soldiers buried in the post cemetery were reinterred in the Custer Battlefield National Cemetery near Crow Agency, Montana.

== Garrison ==
- August—October 1865 - 6th Michigan Volunteer Cavalry (4 Companies): Colonel James H. Kidd
- October 1865—April 1866 - 5th United States Volunteer Infantry (2 Companies): Captain George W. Williford; Company A, Omaha and Winnebago Scouts: Captain Edwin R. Nash
- April—June 1866 - 5th United States Volunteer Infantry (2 Companies): Captain George M. Bailey
- June—September 1866 - 18th United States Infantry (3 Companies): Captain Joseph L. Proctor
- September 1866—August 1868 - 27th United States Infantry (3 Companies): Captain Joseph L. Proctor
- March 1876 - 4th United States Infantry (2 Companies): Captain Edwin M. Coates

== See also ==
- Wyoming Historical Landmarks
- List of the oldest buildings in Wyoming

== Photo gallery ==
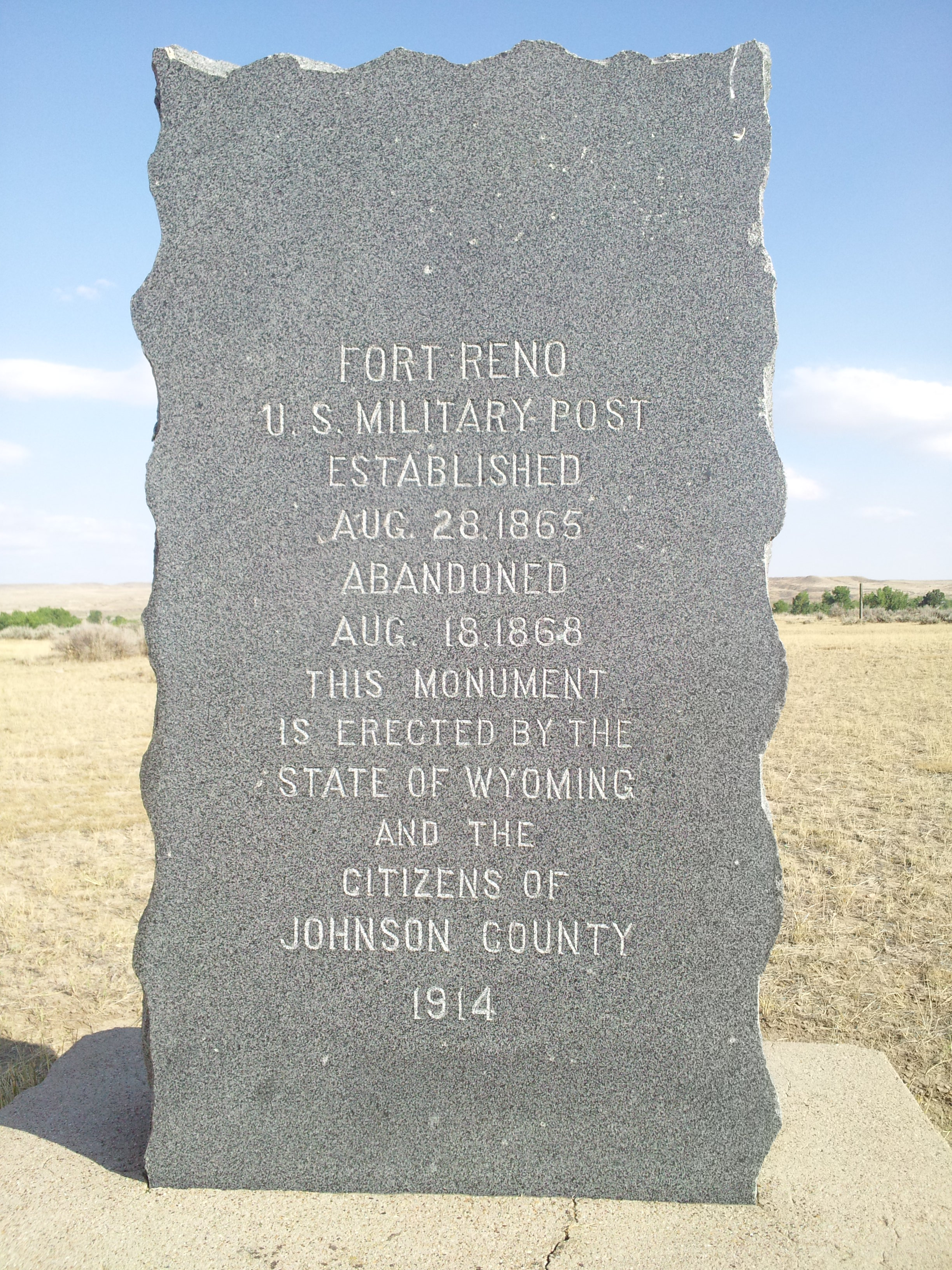
Fort Reno Monument

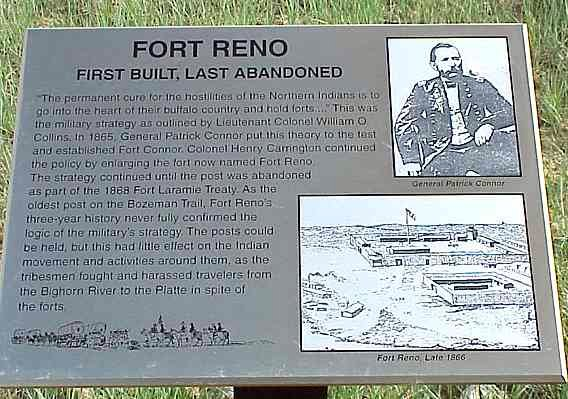
Fort Reno marker

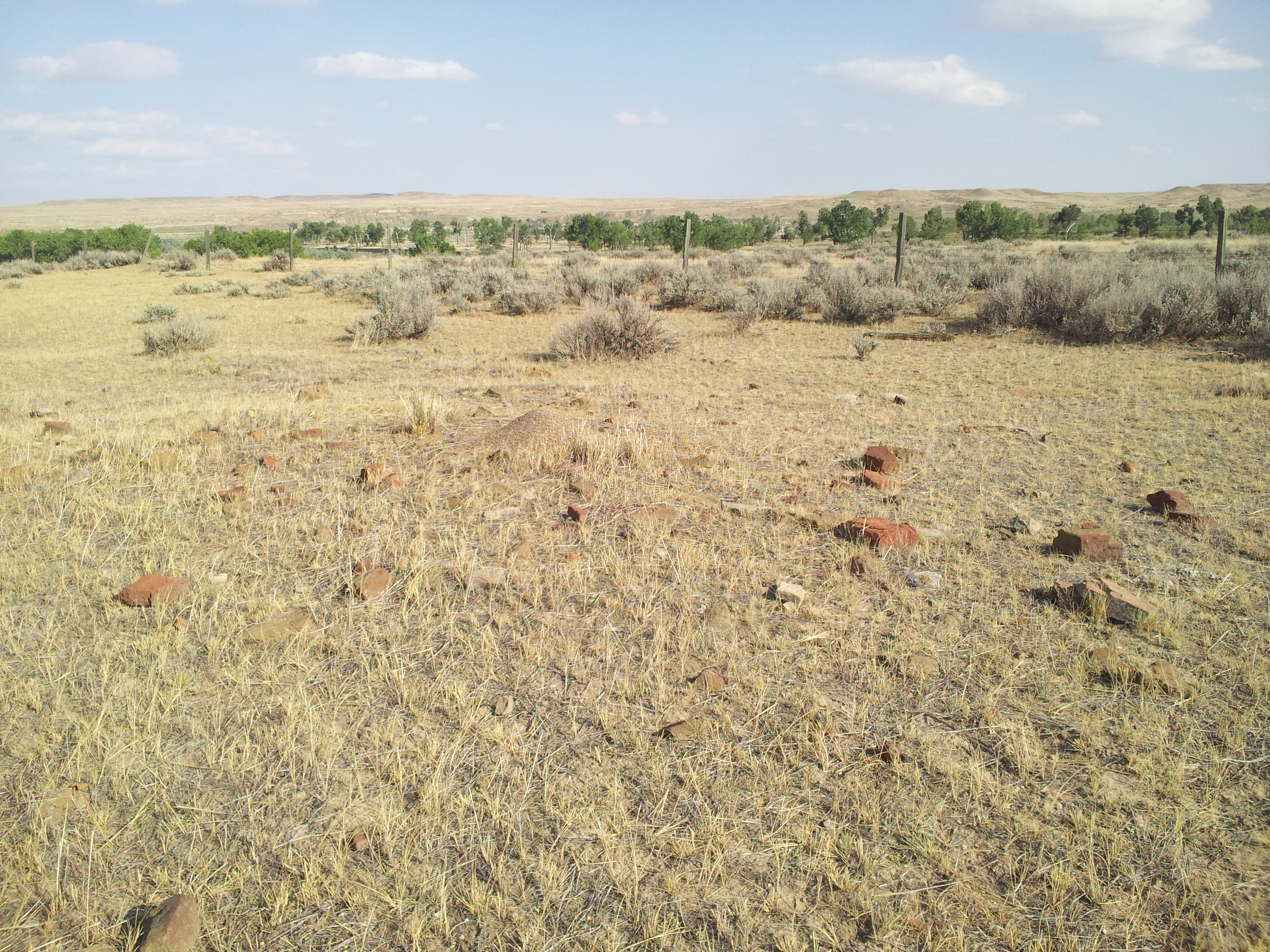
Ruins of a building at Fort Reno
