= Powder River (Wyoming and Montana) =

River in Wyoming and Montana, United States

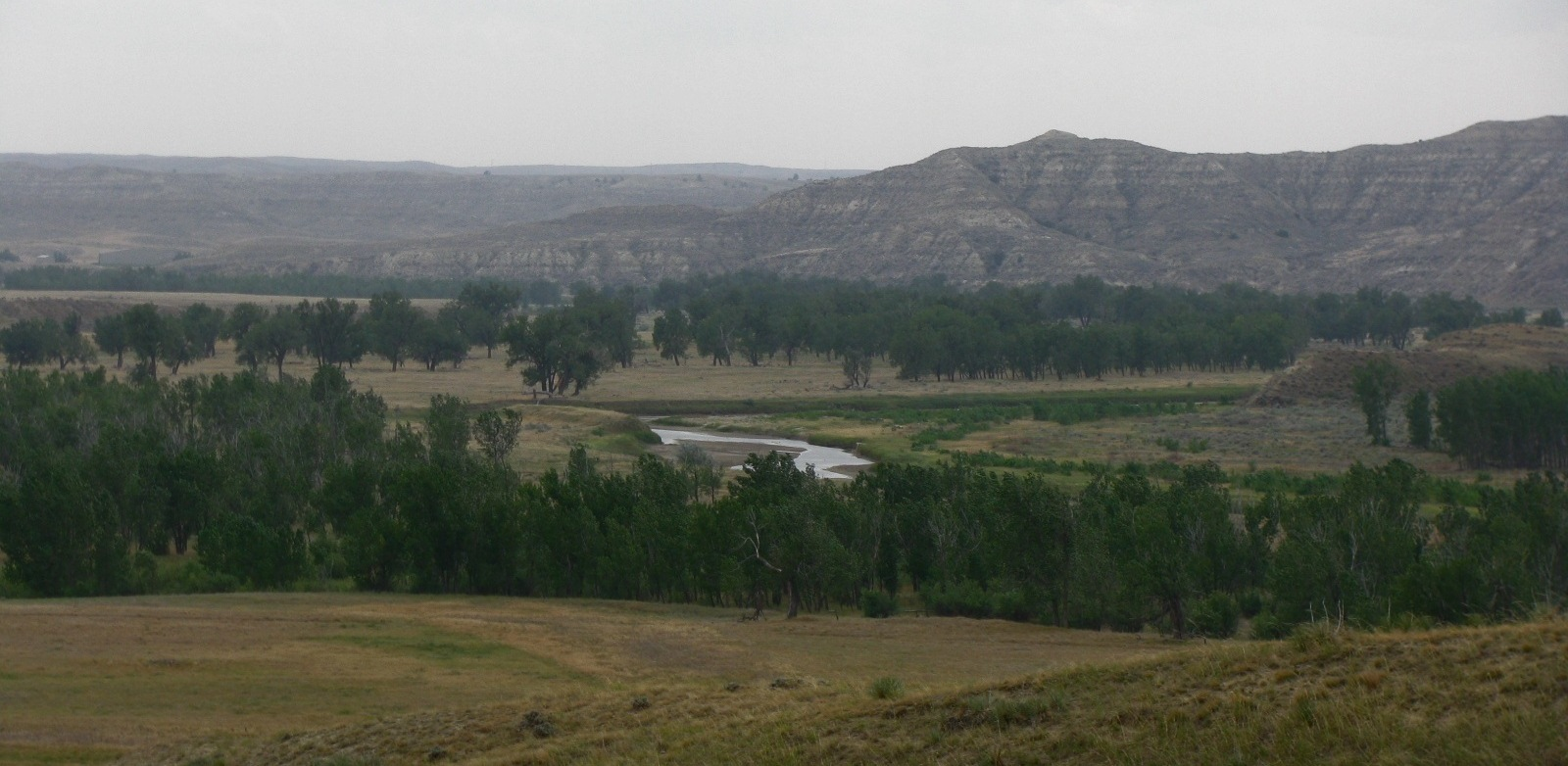
- A view of the Powder River in northern Wyoming

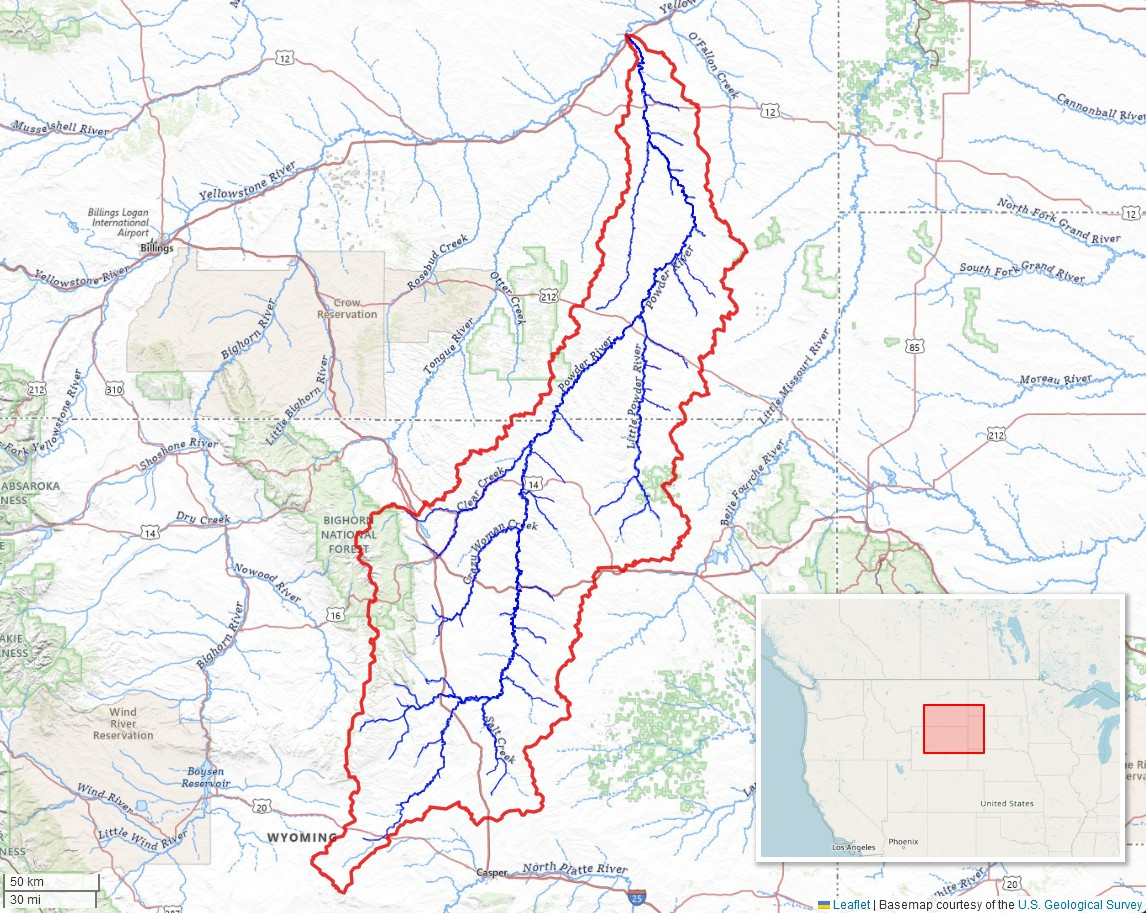
- Powder River watershed (Interactive map)
- Native name: Páeo'hé'e (Cheyenne); Bilápchaashe (Crow)

Location
- Country: United States
- State: Wyoming, Montana

Physical characteristics
- Source: Confluence of Middle Fork and North Fork
  - location: Near Kaycee, Wyoming
  - coordinates: 43°40′30″N 106°30′45″W
  - elevation: 4,564 ft (1,391 m)
- Mouth: Yellowstone River
  - location: Near Terry, Montana
  - coordinates: 46°44′00″N 105°26′02″W
  - elevation: 2,241 ft (683 m)
- Length: 375 mi (604 km)
- Basin size: 21,875 sq mi (56,660 km^{2})
- Discharge
  - location: Locate, MT
  - average: 558 cu ft/s (15.8 m^{3}/s)
  - minimum: 0 cu ft/s (0 m^{3}/s)
  - maximum: 31,000 cu ft/s (880 m^{3}/s)

Basin features
- Tributaries
  - left: Crazy Woman Creek, Clear Creek, Mizpah Creek
  - right: Wild Horse Creek (Wyoming), Little Powder River

Powder River is a tributary of the Yellowstone River, approximately 375 miles (604 km) long in northeastern Wyoming and southeastern Montana in the United States. Combined with its tributary, the South Fork Powder River, it is 550 miles long. It drains an area historically known as the Powder River Country on the high plains east of the Bighorn Mountains.

It rises in four forks in north central Wyoming. The North, Red, and Middle forks rise along the eastern slope of the Bighorn Mountains. The South Fork rises on the southern slopes of the Bighorn Mountains west of Casper. The four forks meet on the foothills east of the Bighorns near the town of Kaycee. The combined stream flows northward, east of the Bighorns, and into Montana. It accepts the Little Powder near the town of Broadus, and discharges into the Yellowstone approximately 50 miles (80 km) downriver from Miles City, Montana. The Powder River was so named (in the English language and local indigenous languages) because the sand along a portion of its banks resembles powder or dust.

== Middle Fork ==
The Middle Fork begins in the extreme north of Natrona County, flowing north and then eastward toward Kaycee. While descending the mountains, the river passes through the 500-foot deep Outlaw Canyon, so named for the numerous wild west bandits, including Jesse James and the Wild Bunch, who would hide out in caves in the canyon when pursued by law enforcement. The mouth of the canyon is only a few miles from Hole-in-the-Wall to the southeast.

The river through the canyon is classified as a blue ribbon stream by the Wyoming Game and Fish Department and considered one of the most productive streams for trout in Wyoming, drawing anglers from around the United States and the world.

== See also ==
- Powder River Country
- Fort McKinney (Wyoming)
- List of Wyoming rivers
- List of rivers of Montana
- Montana Stream Access Law
