= Arapaho =

Native American tribe

Inun-ina, Hinono'eino
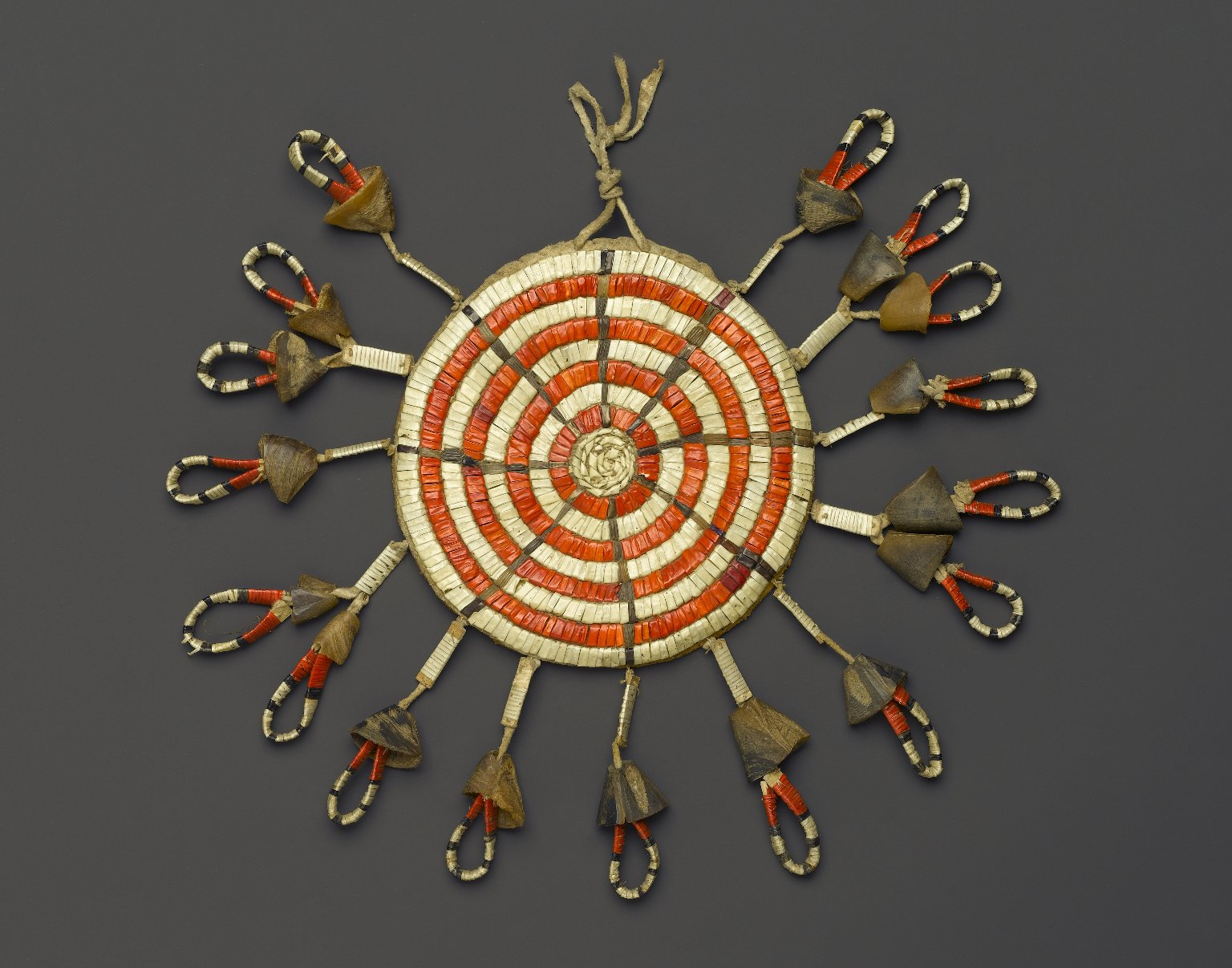
- Arapaho quillwork pouch, late 19th century, Brooklyn Museum

Total population
- 10,861 (2010)

Regions with significant populations
- United States; (Oklahoma, Wyoming, formerly Colorado, Nebraska)

Languages
- English, Arapaho, Plains Sign Language, formerly Nawathinehena

Religion
- Christianity, Peyotism, Traditional religions

Related ethnic groups
- Other Algonquians, Cheyennes, Gros Ventre

- Person: Hinono'eino
- People: Hinono'eiteen
- Language: Hinónoʼeitíít, Bee3osohoot
- Country: Hinono'eino' Biito'owu'

The Arapaho (/əˈræpəhoʊ/ ə-RAP-ə-hoh; French: Arapahos, Gens de Vache) are a Native American people historically living on the plains of Colorado and Wyoming. They were close allies of the Cheyenne tribe and loosely aligned with the Lakota and Dakota.

By the 1850s, Arapaho bands formed two tribes, namely the Northern Arapaho and Southern Arapaho. Since 1878, the Northern Arapaho have lived with the Eastern Shoshone on the Wind River Reservation in Wyoming and are federally recognized as the Northern Arapaho Tribe of the Wind River Reservation. The Southern Arapaho live with the Southern Cheyenne in Oklahoma. Together, their members are enrolled as the federally recognized Cheyenne and Arapaho Tribes.

== Names ==
It is uncertain where the word Arapaho came from. Europeans may have derived it from the Pawnee word for "trader", iriiraraapuhu, or it may have been a corruption of a Crow word for "tattoo", alapúuxaache. The Arapaho autonym is Hinono'eino or Inun-ina ("our people" or "people of our own kind"). They refer to their tribe as Hinono'eiteen (Arapaho Nation). The Cheyenne called them Hitanwo'iv or Hetanevoeo/Hetanevo'eo'o ("People of the Sky" or "Cloud People"); the Dakota as Mahpíyato ("Blue Cloud Men"), and the Lakota and Nakota referred to them as Maȟpíya thó ("Blue Sky People").

The Caddo (Toniibeenenno' or Toniibeeneseino' – "pierced nose people") called them Detseka'yaa, the Wichita (Hinosouno') Nia'rhari's-kûrikiwa'ahûski, and the Comanche Saria Tʉhka / Säretika (Sata Teichas), all names signifying "dog-eaters". The Pawnee, Ute and other tribes also referred to them with names signifying "dog-eaters".

The Northern Arapaho, who called themselves Nank'haanseine'nan or Nookhose'iinenno ("white sage men"), were known as Baantcline'nan or Bo'oociinenno ("red willow men") to the Southern Arapaho, whereas the latter were called by their northern kin Nawathi'neha or Noowunenno' ("Southerners"). The Northern Arapaho were also known as BSakuune'na' (Bee'eekuunnenno') ("blood-soup men").

The Cheyenne adapted the Arapaho terms and referred to the Northern Arapaho as Vanohetan or Vanohetaneo / Váno'étaneo'o ("Sage (Brush) People") and to the Southern Arapaho as Nomsen'nat or Nomsen'eo ("Southerners").

== Historic political and dialect Arapaho divisions and bands ==
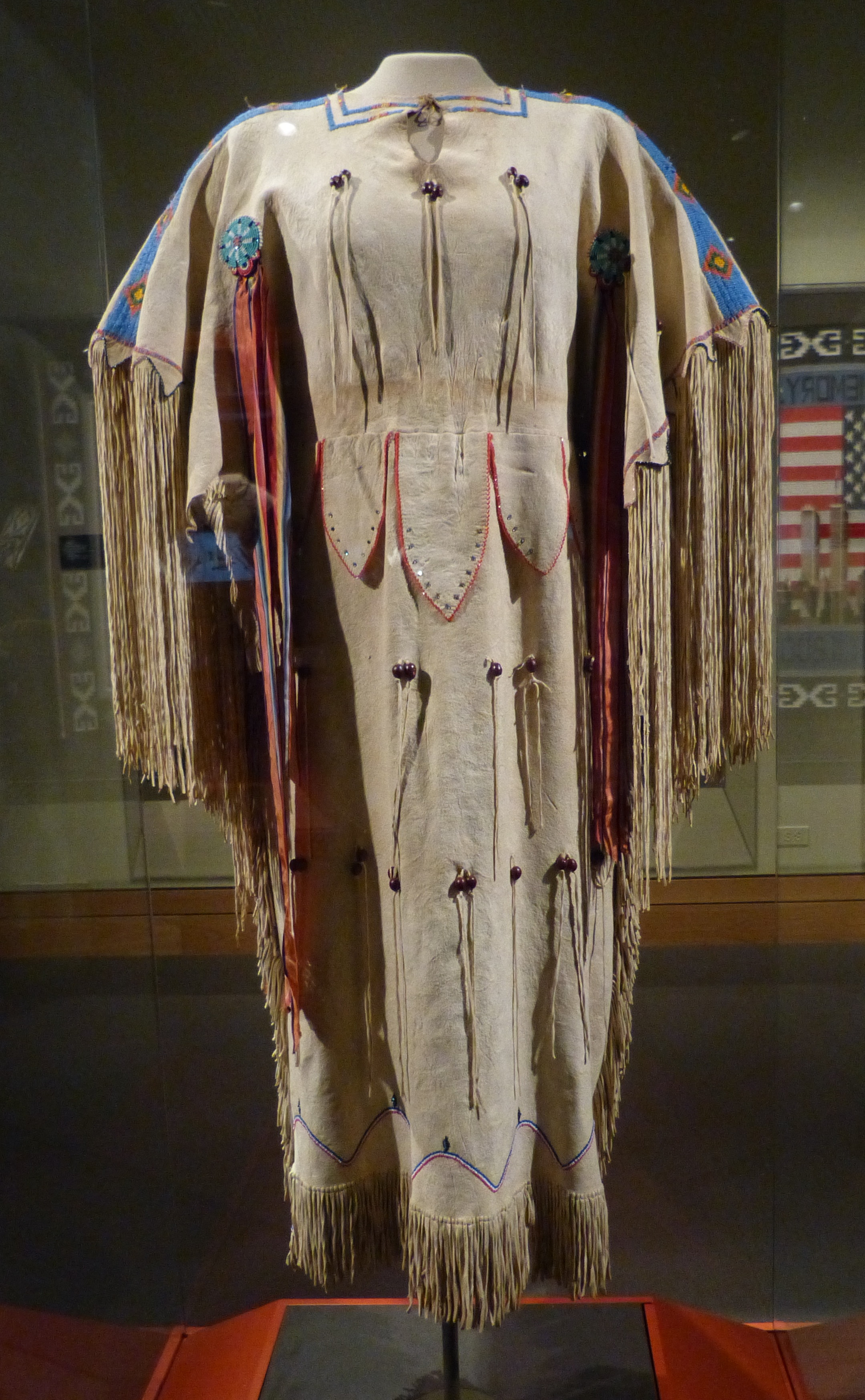
Arapaho dress

Arapaho man.

The Arapaho recognize five main divisions among their people, each speaking a different dialect and apparently representing as many originally distinct but cognate tribes. Through much of Arapaho history, each tribal nation maintained a separate ethnic identity, although they occasionally came together and acted as political allies.

Each spoke mutually intelligible dialects, which differed from Arapaho proper. Dialectally, the Haa'ninin, Beesowuunenno', and Hinono'eino were closely related. Arapaho elders claimed that the Hánahawuuena dialect was the most difficult to comprehend of all the dialects.

In his classic ethnographic study, Alfred Kroeber identified these five nations from south to north:

- Nanwacinaha'ana, Nawathi'neha ("Toward the South People") or Nanwuine'nan / Noowo3iineheeno' ("Southern People"). Their now-extinct language dialect – Nawathinehena – was the most divergent from the other Arapaho tribes.
- Hánahawuuena (Note: Also Hanahawunena, Aanu’hawa, Aanuhawa, Aanunhawa, Hananaxawuune'nan, Aanû'nhawa.) ("Rock Men" or "Rock People"), occupying territory adjacent to, but further north of the Nanwacinaha'ana, spoke the now-extinct Ha'anahawunena dialect.
- Hinono'eino or Hinanae'inan ("Arapaho proper") spoke the Arapaho language (Heenetiit).
- Beesowuunenno', Baasanwuune'nan or Bäsawunena ("Big Lodge People" or "Brush-Hut/Shelter People") resided further north of the Hinono'eino. Their war parties used temporary brush shelters similar to the dome-shaped shade or Sweat lodge of the Great Lakes Algonquian peoples. They are said to have migrated from their former territory near the Lakes more recently than the other Arapaho tribes. (Note: many people say their name means "Great Lakes People" or "Big Water People".) They spoke the now-extinct Besawunena (Beesoowuuyeitiit – "Big Lodge/Great Lakes language") dialect.
- Haa'ninin, A'aninin or A'ani ("White Clay People" or "Lime People"), the northernmost tribal group; they retained a distinct ethnicity and were known to the French as the historic Gros Ventre. In Blackfoot they were called Atsina (Atsíína – "like a Cree", i.e. "enemy", or Piik-siik-sii-naa – "snakes", i.e. "enemies"). After they separated, the other Arapaho peoples, who considered them inferior, called them Hitúnĕna or Hittiuenina ("Begging Men", "Beggars", or more exactly "Spongers"). They speak the nearly extinct Gros Ventre (Ananin, Ahahnelin) language dialect (called by the Arapaho Hitouuyeitiit – "Begging Men Language"), there is evidence that the southern Haa'ninin tribal group, the Staetan band, together with bands of the later political division of the Northern Arapaho, spoke the Besawunena dialect.

Before their historic geo-political ethnogenesis, each tribal-nation had a principal headman. The exact date of the ethnic fusion or fission of each social division is not known. The elders say that the Hinono'eino ("Arapaho proper") and Beesowuunenno' ("Big Lodge People" or "Brush-Hut/Shelter People") fought over the tribal symbols – the sacred pipe and lance. Both sacred objects traditionally were kept by the Beesowuunenno'. The different tribal-nations lived together and the Beesowuunenno' have dispersed for at least 150 years among the formerly distinct Arapaho tribal groups.

By the late 18th century, the four divisions south of the Haa'ninin ("White Clay People" or "Lime People") or Gros Ventre (Atsina) consolidated into the Arapaho. Only the Arapaho and Gros Ventre (Atsina) identified as separate tribal nations.

Flag for the Northern Arapaho Tribe of the Wind River Reservation

While living on the Great Plains, the Hinono'eino (all Arapaho bands south of the Haa'ninin) divided historically into two geopolitical social divisions:

- Northern Arapaho or Nank'haanseine'nan ("Sagebrush People"), Nookhose'iinenno ("White Sage People"); are called by the Southern Arapaho Bo'ooceinenno' or Baachinena ("red willow men"); the Kiowa know them as Tägyäko ("Sagebrush People"), a translation of their proper name. They keep the sacred tribal articles, and are considered the nucleus or mother tribe of the Arapaho, being indicated in the Plains Indian Sign Language (Bee3sohoet) by the sign for "mother people". They absorbed the historic Hánahawuuena and Beesowuunenno'. An estimated 50 persons of Beesowuunenno' lineage are included among the Northern Arapaho, and perhaps a few with the other two main divisions.
- Southern Arapaho, Náwunena or Noowunenno' ("Southern People"), are called by the Northern Arapaho Nawathi'neha ("Southerners"); the Kiowa know them as Ähayädal, the (plural) name for the wild plum. The sign for the Southern Arapaho is made by rubbing the index finger against the side of the nose. They absorbed the historic Nanwuine'nan / Noowo3iineheeno ("Southern People") and some Beesowuunenno'.

=== Language ===
Precontact distribution of Algonquian languages

The Arapaho language is currently spoken in two different dialects, and it is considered to be a member of the Algonquian language family. The number of fluent speakers of Northern Arapaho has dwindled to 250, most living on the Wind River Reservation in Wyoming, while the number of Southern Arapaho speakers is even more scarce, with only a handful of people who speak it, all advanced in age.

According to Cowell & Moss's 2008 study of the Arapaho language, the Northern Arapaho have made a great effort to maintain the language through establishing the Language and Culture Commission. By producing audio and visual materials, they have provided ways for younger generations to learn the language. In 1995 this effort was matched by Dr. S. N. Greymorning, who established an Arapaho language immersion preschool program. Arapaho language instruction is also offered all throughout grade school. However, the number of students that take the subject is wavering and those who learn typically only retain a selection of memorized vocabulary. There is widespread interest in keeping the language alive for the Northern Arapaho, and their outlook remains positive in their endeavors to perpetuate the learning of Arapaho in schools and among their children and young people. However, this attitude is often counteracted by the lack of true commitment and willingness to really learn and become fluent, underscored by a misunderstanding of its deep roots and purpose.

For Southern Arapaho, the language is not quite as valued as it is on the Wind River Reservation. Most have lost interest in learning or maintaining it, and until recently, there were little to no efforts to preserve their dialect. There is a small number who have begun online courses conducted via video in an attempt to revitalize a desire to learn it, and popularity has increased over the past few years.

== Histories ==
=== Early history ===
Around 3,000 years ago, the ancestral Arapaho-speaking people (Heeteinono'eino') lived in the western Great Lakes region along the Red River Valley in what is classified as present-day Manitoba, Canada and Minnesota, United States. There the Arapaho were an agricultural people who grew crops, including maize. Following European colonization in eastern Canada, together with the early Cheyenne people (Hitesiino'), the Arapaho were forced to migrate westward onto the eastern Great Plains by the Ojibwe. They were numerous and powerful, having obtained guns from their French trading allies.

The ancestors of the Arapaho people entered the Great Plains from the western Great Lakes region sometime before 1700. During their early history on the plains, the Arapaho lived on the northern plains from the South Saskatchewan River in Canada south to Montana, Wyoming, and western South Dakota. Before the Arapaho acquired horses, they used domestic dogs as pack animals to pull their travois. The Arapaho acquired horses in the early 1700s from other tribes, which changed their way of life. They became nomadic people, using the horses as pack and riding animals. They could transport greater loads, and travel more easily by horseback to hunt more easily and widely, increasing their success in hunting on the Plains.

Gradually, the Arapaho moved farther south, split into the closely allied Northern and Southern Arapaho, and established a large joint territory spanning land in southern Montana, most of Wyoming, the Nebraska Panhandle, central and eastern Colorado, western Oklahoma, and extreme western Kansas. A large group of Arapaho split from the main tribe and became an independent people, commonly known as the Gros Ventre (as named by the French) or Atsina. The name Gros Ventre, meaning "Big Bellies" in French, was a misinterpretation of sign language between an Indian guide and French explorers. The Gros Ventre spoke an Algonquian language similar to Arapaho after the division; they identified as A'aninin, meaning ″White Clay people″. The Arapaho often viewed the Gros Ventre as inferior and referred to them as Hitúnĕna or Hitouuteen, meaning "beggars".

=== Expansion on the plains ===
Once established, the Arapaho began to expand on the plains through trade, warfare, and alliances with other plains tribes. Around 1811, the Arapaho made an alliance with the Cheyenne (Hítesíínoʼ – 'scarred one'). Their strong alliance with the Cheyenne allowed the Arapaho to greatly expand their hunting territory. By 1826, the Lakota, Dakota, Cheyenne, and Arapaho pushed the Kiowa (Niiciiheihiinennoʼ; Kiowa tribe: Niiciiheihiiteen) and invading Comanche to the south. Conflict with the allied Comanche and Kiowa ended in 1840 when the two large tribes made peace with the Arapaho and Southern Cheyenne and became their allies.

Chief Little Raven was the most notable Arapaho chief; he helped mediate peace among the nomadic southern plains tribes and would retain his reputation as a peace chief throughout the Indian Wars and reservation period. The alliance with the Comanche and Kiowa made the most southern Arapaho bands powerful enough to enter the Llano Estacado in the Texas Panhandle. One band of Southern Arapaho became so closely allied with the Comanche that they were absorbed into the tribe, adopted the Comanche language, and became a band of Comanche known as the Saria Tʉhka (Sata Teichas) 'dog-eaters'.

Along the upper Missouri River, the Arapaho actively traded with the farming villages of the Arikara, Mandan, and Hidatsa, trading meat and hides for corn, squash, and beans. The Arikara referred to the Arapaho as the "Colored Stone Village (People)", possibly because gemstones from the Southwest were among the trade items. The Hidatsa called them E-tah-leh or Ita-Iddi ('buffalo-path people'), referring to their hunting of bison.

Conflict with Euro-American traders and explorers was limited at the time. The Arapaho freely entered various trading posts and trade fairs to exchange mostly bison hides and beaver furs for European goods such as firearms. The Arapaho frequently encountered fur traders in the foothills of the Rocky Mountains, and the headwaters of the Platte and Arkansas. They became well-known traders on the plains and bordering Rocky Mountains. The name Arapaho may have been derived from the Pawnee word Tirapihu (or Larapihu), meaning "he buys or trades" or "traders". The Arapaho were a prominent trading group in the Great Plains region. The term may also have come from European-American traders referring to them by their Crow (Apsáalooke aliláau) name of Alappahoʼ, which meant 'people with many tattoos'. By custom the Arapaho tattooed small circles on their bodies. The name Arapaho became widespread among the white traders.

=== Enemies and warrior culture ===
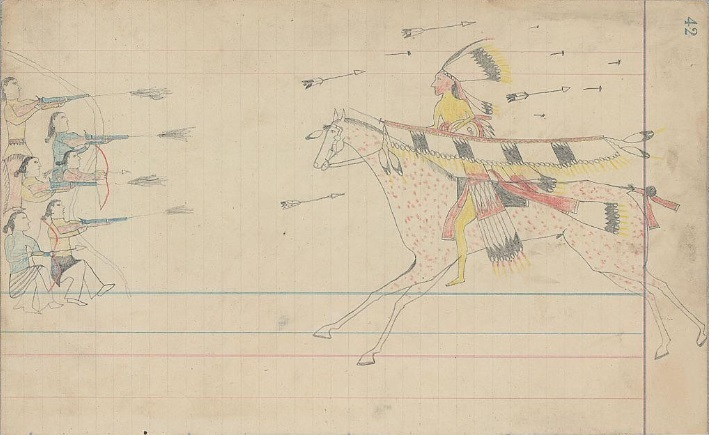
Ledger drawing of a mounted Arapaho warrior fighting a group of Navajo or Pueblo warriors, c. 1880

A large part of Arapaho society was based around the warrior. Most young men sought this role. After adopting use of the horse, the Arapaho quickly became master horsemen and highly skilled at fighting on horseback. Warriors had larger roles than combat in the society. They were expected to keep peace among the camps, provide food and wealth for their families, and guard the camps from attacks.

Like other plains Indians, including their Cheyenne allies, the Arapaho have a number of distinct military societies. Each of the eight Arapaho military societies had their own unique initiation rites, pre- and post- battle ceremonies and songs, regalia, and style of combat. Unlike their Cheyenne, Lakota, and Dakota allies, the Arapaho military societies were age based. Each age level had its own society for prestigious or promising warriors of the matching age. As the warriors aged, they may graduate to the next society.

Warriors often painted their face and bodies with war paint, as well as their horses, for spiritual empowerment. Each warrior created a unique design for the war paint which they often wore into battle. Feathers from birds, particularly eagle feathers, were also worn in battle as symbols of prestige and for reasons similar to war paint. Before setting out for war, the warriors organized into war parties. War parties were made up of individual warriors and a selected war chief. The title of war chief must be earned through a specific number of acts of bravery in battle known as counting coup. Coups may include stealing horses while undetected, touching a living enemy, or stealing a gun from an enemy's grasp. Arapaho warriors used a variety of weapons, including war-clubs, lances, knives, tomahawks, bows, shotguns, rifles, and pistols. They acquired guns through trade at trading posts or trade fairs, in addition to raiding soldiers or other tribes.

The Arapaho fought with the Pawnee (Hooxeihiinenno' – "wolf people"), Omaha (Howohoono'), Ho-chunk, Osage (Wosootiinen, Wosoo3iinen or Wosoosiinen), Ponca (same as Omaha: Howohoono'), and Kaw (Honoho') east of their territory. North of Arapaho territory they fought with the Crow (Houunenno'), Blackfoot Confederacy (Woo'teenixteet or Woo'teenixtee3i' – ″people wearing black-feet″), Gros Ventre (Hitouunenno', Gros Ventre tribe: Hitouuteen), Flathead (Kookee'ei3i'), Arikara (Koonoonii3i' – ″people whose jaws break in pieces″), Iron Confederacy (Nehiyaw-Pwat) (Assiniboine (Nihooneihteenootineihino' - "yellow-footed Sioux"), Plains/Woods Cree (Nooku(h)nenno'; Plains Cree tribe: Nookuho' - "rabbit people"), Saulteaux (Plains Ojibwa) and Nakoda (Stoney)). To the west they fought with eastern Shoshone (Sosoni'ii; Shoshone tribe: Sosoni'iiteen) and the Ute (Wo'(o)teenehi3i' - ″cut throats″; Ute tribe: Wo'(o)teennehhiiteen). South of their territory they occasionally fought with the Navajo (Coohoh'oukutoo3i' – ″those who tie their hair in back of the head or in bunches″), Apache (Coo3o' – "enemy" or Teebe'eisi3i' – "they have their hair cut straight, hanging straight down", Ti'iihiinen – "killdeer people" refers especially to Jicarilla Apache) and various Pueblo peoples (Cooh'ookutoo3i' – "they tie their hair in a bundle").

The Cheyenne (Hitesiino'), Sioux (Nootineihino'), Kiowa (Niiciiheihiinenno' – ″river people″ or Koh'ówuunénno' – ″creek people″; Kiowa tribe: Niiciiheihiiteen or Koh'ówuunteen), Plains Apache (3oxooheinen – "pounder people"), and Comanche (Coo3o' – sg. and pl., means: "enemy", like Apache) were enemies of the Arapaho initially but became their allies. Together with their allies, the Arapaho also fought with invading US soldiers, miners, and settlers across Arapaho territory and the territory of their allies.

=== Sand Creek Massacre ===
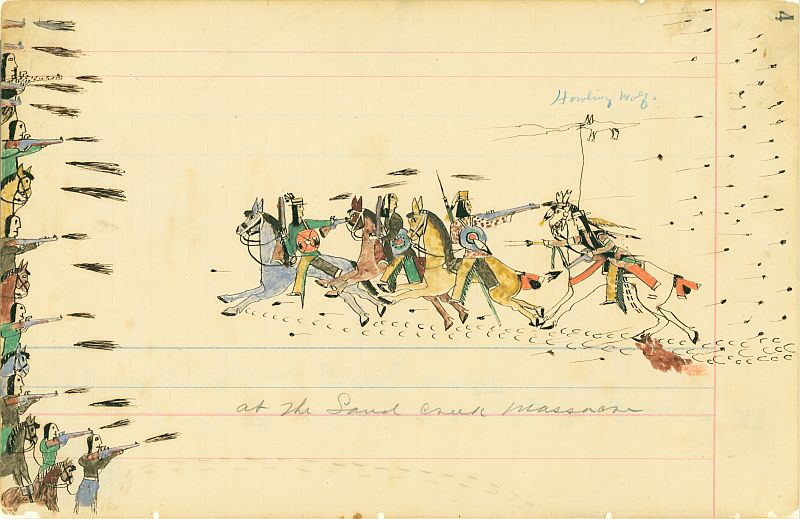
Ledger drawing of a scene from the massacre by Cheyenne eyewitness and artist Howling Wolf.

==== Events Leading to the Sand Creek Massacre ====
Several skirmishes had ignited hatred from white settlers that lived in the area, and left Arapaho and Cheyenne tribes in constant fear of being attacked by American troops. For example, on April 12, 1864, a rancher brought troops to attack a group of 15 warriors who had asked to be rewarded for bringing his mules back to him. The warriors acted in self-defense and sent the troops running. Word got back to Colonel John Chivington, and they had told him the Indians shot first. He also heard there were 175 cattle head stolen from the government. Chivington "ordered troops to find and 'chastise' the 'Indians'." Soldiers burned villages and sought out to kill Indians, the violence escalating months before the Sand Creek Massacre.

In an effort to establish peace, John Evans attempted to extend an offer of refuge and protection to "friendly" Indians. However, these efforts were trampled by General Curtis' military expedition against tribes between the Platte and Arkansas Rivers. By this point, both Arapaho and Cheyenne tribes thought that an all out war of extermination was about to rage against them, so they quickly fled, and Curtis and his men never met them.

==== Sand Creek Massacre ====
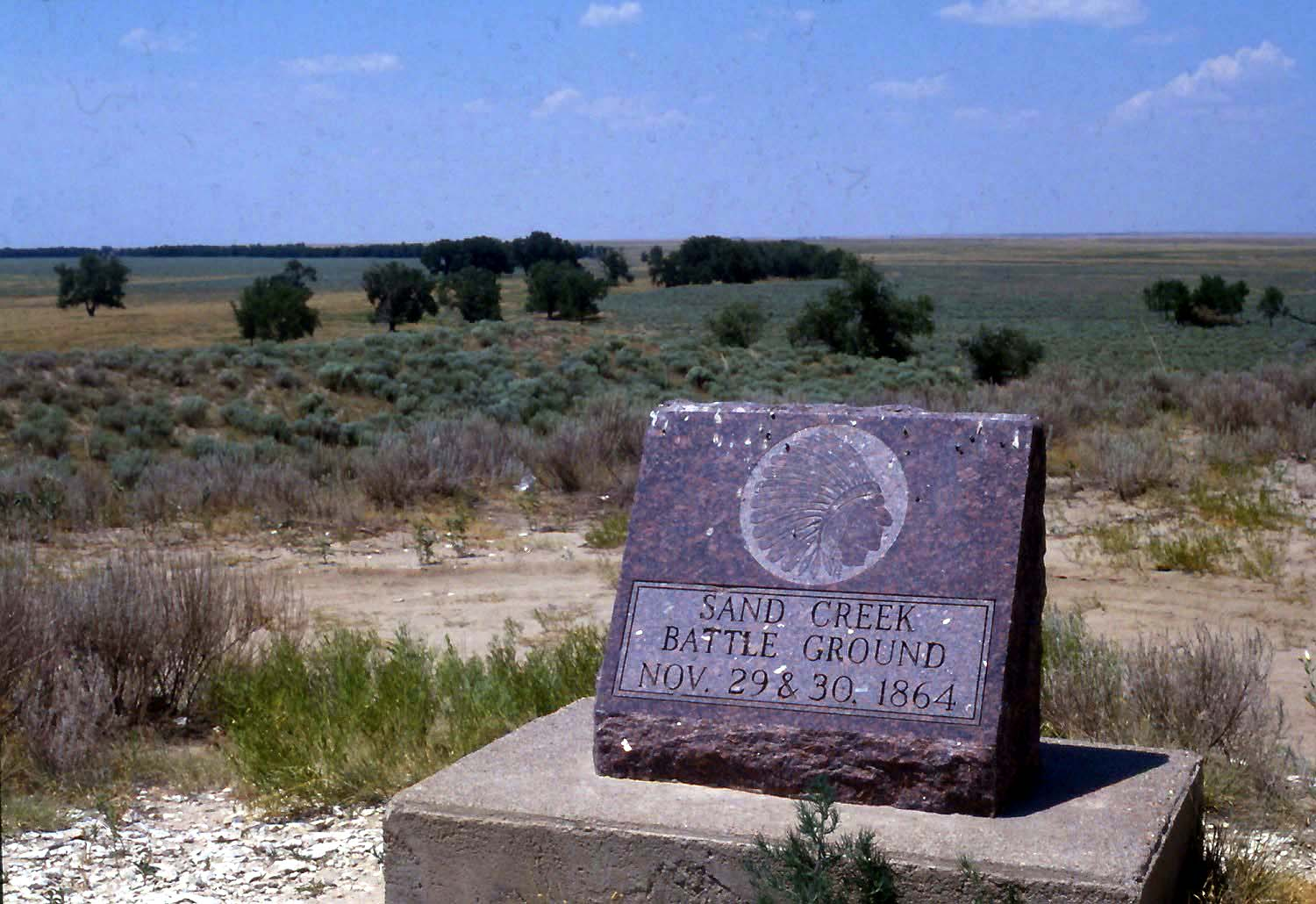
Present day marker of the Sand Creek Massacre site in Kiowa County, Colorado.

In November 1864, the Colorado militia, led by Colonel John Chivington, massacred a small village of Cheyenne and Arapaho in the Sand Creek massacre. According to a historical narrative on the event titled "Chief Left Hand", by Margaret Coel, there were several events that led to the Colorado militia's attack on the village. Governor Evans desired to hold title to the resource-rich Denver-Boulder area. The government trust officials avoided Chief Left Hand, a linguistically gifted Southern Arapaho chief, when executing their treaty that transferred the title of the area away from Indian Trust. The local cavalry was stretched thin by the demands of the Civil War while Indian warriors, acting independently of Chief Left Hand, raided their supply lines. A group of Arapaho and Cheyenne elders with women and children had been denied their traditional wintering grounds in Boulder by the cavalry and were ordered to come to Fort Lyon for food and protection or be considered hostile.

On arrival at Lyon, Chief Left Hand and his followers were accused of violence by Colonel Chivington. Chief Left Hand and his people got the message that only those Indians that reported to Fort Lyon would be considered peaceful and all others would be considered hostile and ordered killed. Confused, Chief Left Hand and his followers turned away and traveled a safe distance away from the fort to camp. A traitor gave Colonel Chivington directions to the camp. He and his battalion stalked and attacked the camp early the next morning. Rather than heroic, Colonel Chivington's efforts were considered a gross embarrassment to the Cavalry since he attacked peaceful elders, women, and children. As a result of his war efforts, instead of receiving the promotion to which he aspired, he was relieved of his duties.

On October 14, 1865, almost a year after the Sand Creek Massacre, The Arapaho and Cheyenne signed a new treaty with the US government. The treaty addressed the future of conflict between the two tribes and the US government, it outlined new boundaries, it forced the tribe to relinquish claims to other lands, amongst many other demands. The treaty, spanning nine articles, was ratified on May 22, 1866, and then later proclaimed on February 2, 1867.

Eugene Ridgely, a Cheyenne–Northern Arapaho artist, is credited with bringing to light the fact that Arapahos were among the victims of the massacre. His children, Gail Ridgely, Benjamin Ridgley, and Eugene "Snowball" Ridgely, were instrumental in having the massacre site designated as a National Historic Site. In 1999, Benjamin and Gail Ridgley organized a group of Northern Arapaho runners to run from Limon, Colorado, to Ethete, Wyoming, in memory of their ancestors who were forced to run for their lives after being attacked and pursued by Colonel Chivington and his battalion. Their efforts will be recognized and remembered by the "Sand Creek Massacre" signs that appear along the roadways from Limon to Casper, Wyoming, and then to Ethete.

==== Why the Sand Creek Massacre Occurred ====
The violence that ensued was deeply rooted in the Indian-hating by American settlers in the area. Their perception was that "their nascent settlements were indeed surrounded by Indians", and their inexperience in dealing with Indians was what sparked the Sand Creek Massacre.

=== Indian Wars on the Southern Plains ===
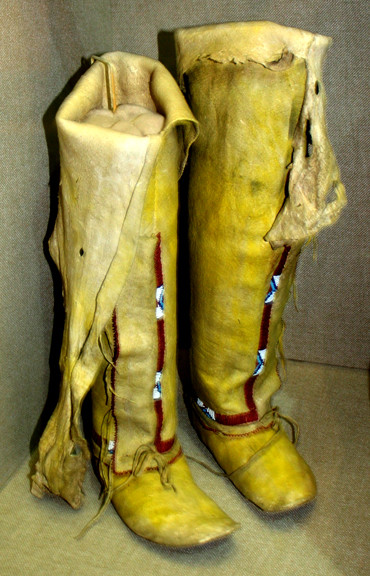
Southern Arapaho women's leggings and moccasins, c. 1910, Oklahoma History Center

The events at Sand Creek sparked outrage among the Arapaho and Cheyenne, resulting in three decades of war between them and the United States. Much of the hostilities took place in Colorado, leading to many of the events being referred to as part of the so-called Colorado War. Battles and hostilities elsewhere on the southern plains such as in Kansas and Texas are often included as part of the "Comanche Wars". During the wars, the Arapaho and Cheyenne allies—the Kiowa, Comanche, and Plains Apache—would participate in some battles alongside them. The Lakota from the north came down into northern Colorado to help the Arapaho and Cheyenne there. The Battle of Julesburg resulted from a force of about 1,000 allied Northern Arapaho, Cheyenne (mostly from the Dog Soldiers warrior society), and Lakota from the Sicangu and Oglala sub-tribes. The point of the raid was retaliation for the events at the Sand Creek Massacre months earlier. The allied Indian forces attacked settlers and US Army forces around the valley of the South Platte River near Julesburg, Colorado. The battle was a decisive Indian victory, resulting in 14 soldiers and four civilians dead and probably no Indian casualties. A force of around 3,000 Southern Arapaho, Northern Cheyenne, and Lakota attacked soldiers and civilians at a bridge crossing the North Platte River, known as the Battle of Platte Bridge. The battle was another victory for the Indians, with 29 soldiers killed and at least eight Indian casualties. Arapaho, Cheyenne, Comanche, Kiowa, and Plains Apaches seeking peace were offered to sign the Medicine Lodge Treaty in October 1867. The treaty allotted the Southern Arapaho a reservation with the Southern Cheyenne between the Arkansas and Cimarron rivers in Indian Territory (present-day Oklahoma). Among those that signed the treaty was Chief Little Raven. Those that did not sign the treaty were called "hostile" and were continually pursued by the US Army and their Indian scouts. The last major battle between the Arapaho and the US on the southern plains was the Battle of Summit Springs in northernmost Colorado. The battle involved a force of around 450 Arapaho, Cheyenne, and Lakota warriors and 244 US soldiers and around 50 Pawnee scouts under Frank North. The most prominent Indian leader at the battle was Tall Bull, a leader of the Dog Soldiers warrior society of the Cheyenne. The battle was a US victory with around 35 warriors killed (including Tall Bull) and a further 17 captured. The soldiers suffered only a single casualty. The death of Tall Bull was a major loss for the Dog Soldiers.

=== Powder River Expedition ===
After the Sand Creek Massacre and a number of other skirmishes, the Northern Arapaho, Cheyenne, and Lakota moved many of their bands to the remote Powder River country in Wyoming and southern Montana. Along the way, they participated in the Battle of Mud Springs, a minor incident in the Nebraska Panhandle involving a force of between 500 and 1,000 Arapaho, Cheyenne, and Lakota warriors and 230 US soldiers. The battle resulted in the capture of some army horses and a herd of several hundred cattle with a single US casualty. An attempt was made by the army to recapture their stolen livestock and attack the Indians, which resulted in the Battle of Rush Creek. The battle was inconclusive, resulting in only one Indian casualty and three US soldiers dead (with a further eight wounded). Lt. Col. William O. Collins, commander of the army forces, stated that pursuing the Indian forces any further through the dry Sand Hills area would be "injudicious and useless". Once in the area of the Powder River, the Arapaho noticed an increase in travelers moving along the established Bozeman trail, which led to the Montana goldfields. Settlers and miners traveling on the Bozeman Trail through the Powder River country were viewed as threats by the Indians as they were numerous and were often violent towards encountered Indians and competed for food along the trail.

Hostilities in the Powder River area led Major General Grenville M. Dodge to order the Powder River Expedition as a punitive campaign against the Arapaho, Lakota, and Cheyenne. The expedition was inconclusive with neither side gaining a definitive victory. The allied Indian forces mostly evaded the soldiers except for raids on their supplies which left most soldiers desperately under-equipped. The most significant battle was the Battle of the Tongue River where Brigadier General Patrick Edward Connor ordered Frank North and his Pawnee Scouts to find a camp of Arapaho Indians under the leadership of Chief Black Bear. Once located, Connor sent in 200 soldiers with two howitzers and 40 Omaha and Ho-Chunk and 30 Pawnee scouts, and marched toward the village that night. Indian warriors acting as scouts for the US Army came from the Pawnee, Omaha, and Ho-Chunk (Winnebago) tribes who were traditional enemies of the Arapaho and their Cheyenne and Lakota allies. With mountain man Jim Bridger leading the forces, they charged the camp. Most of the Arapaho warriors were gone on a raid against the Crow, and the battle was a US victory resulting in 63 Arapaho dead, mostly women and children. The few warriors present at the camp put up a strong defense and covered the women and children as most escaped beyond the reach of the soldiers and Indian scouts. After the battle, the soldiers burned and looted the abandoned tipis. Connor singled out four Ho-CHunk, including chief Little Priest, plus North and 15 Pawnee for bravery. The Pawnee made off with 500 horses from the camp's herd as payback for previous raids by the Arapaho. The Arapaho were not intimidated by the attack and launched a counterattack resulting in the Sawyers Fight where Arapaho warriors attacked a group of surveyors, resulting in three dead and no Arapaho losses.

=== Red Cloud's War ===
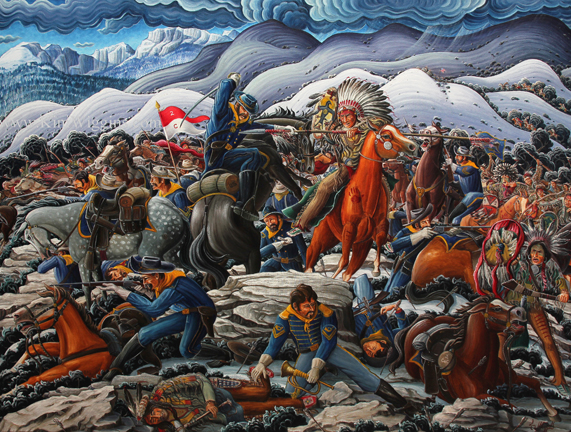
Painting of the Fetterman Fight by Kim Douglas Wiggins.

Red Cloud's War was a war fought between soldiers of the United States and the allied Lakota, Northern Cheyenne, and Northern Arapaho from 1866 to 1868. The war was named after the prominent Oglala Lakota chief Red Cloud who led many followers into battle with the invading soldiers. The war was a response to the large number of miners and settlers passing through the Bozeman Trail, which was the fastest and easiest trail from Fort Laramie to the Montana goldfields. The Bozeman Trail passed right through the Powder River Country which was near the center of Arapaho, Cheyenne, Lakota, and Dakota territory in Wyoming and southern Montana. The large number of miners and settlers competed directly with the Indians for resources such as food along the trail.

The most significant battle during Red Cloud's War was the Fetterman Fight, also known as Battle of The Hundred in the Hand to the Indian forces fought on December 21, 1866. The Battle involved Capt. William J. Fetterman who led a force of 79 soldiers and two civilians after a group of 10 Indian decoys planning on luring Fetterman's forces into an ambush. The 10 decoys consisted of two Arapaho, two Cheyenne, and six Lakota. Fetterman was well known for his boastful nature and his inexperience fighting Indian warriors and despite orders to not pursue the decoys did so anyway. Jim Bridger, famous Mountain Man and guide to the soldiers stationed at Fort Laramie, commented on how the soldiers "don't know anything about fighting Indians". After about a half-mile pursuit, the decoys signaled the hidden warriors to ambush Fetterman and his forces. Warriors from both sides of the trail charged Fetterman and forced them into nearby rocks where the battle soon became hand-to-hand combat, giving the Indians the upper hand due to their skill in fighting with handheld weapons such as tomahawks and war clubs. The Indian forces killed all of Fetterman's infantry, as well as the following cavalry, with a total of 81 killed. The battle was the greatest military defeat by the US on the Great Plains until the Battle of the Little Bighorn 10 years later. Red Cloud's War ended in a victory for the Arapaho, Cheyenne, Lakota, and Dakota. The Treaty of Fort Laramie guaranteed legal control of the Powder River country to the Indians.

=== Great Sioux War of 1876–77 ===
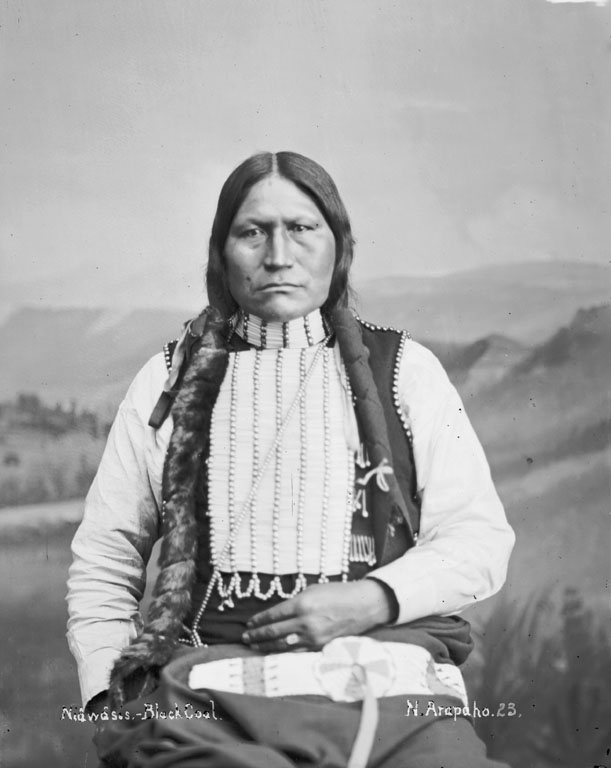
Chief Black Coal, among the most influential Arapaho chiefs of his time. Chief Black Coal was able to largely keep the Arapaho at peace with the United States and out of the Great Sioux war of 1876.

The Great Sioux War of 1876–77, also known as the Black Hills War or Great Cheyenne War, was a major conflict that was fought between the Lakota Sioux, Cheyenne, and Arapaho alliance and the US Army. The war was started after miners and settlers traveled into the Black Hills area and found gold, resulting in increased numbers of non-Indians illegally entering designated Indian lands. A large part of Cheyenne and Arapaho territory and most of Sioux territory known as the Great Sioux Reservation was guaranteed legally to the tribes by the Treaty of Fort Laramie after they defeated the US during Red Cloud's War in 1868. The Black Hills in particular are viewed as sacred to the Lakota and Dakota peoples, and the presence of settlers illegally occupying the area caused great unrest within the tribes. Instead of evicting the settlers, the US Army broke the treaty and invaded Sioux, Cheyenne, and Arapaho territory in order to protect American settlers and put the allied tribes on smaller reservations or wiped them out.

After Red Cloud's War, many Northern Arapaho moved to the Red Cloud Agency in Dakota Territory and lived among the Lakota, as well as many Cheyenne. Among the most influential and respected Arapaho chiefs living on the Agency was Chief Black Coal (Northern Arapaho) (Wo'ooseinee'), who gained prominence as a warrior and leader against white settlers in the Powder River country. Other important Arapaho chiefs living in the area included Medicine Man, Chief Black Bear (Wo'teenox), Sorrel Horse, Little Shield, Sharp Nose (Heeniibeet), Little Wolf, Plenty Bear, and Friday (Teenokuhu'). The Arapaho chief Friday was well regarded for his intelligence and served as an interpreter between the tribe and the Americans. Black Coal guaranteed to the Americans that he and his people would remain peaceful during the tense times when the settlers were illegally entering Indian land in hopes of securing recognized territory of their own in Wyoming. Many of the warriors and families that disagreed with Black Coal's ideals drifted southward to join up with the southern division of Arapahos. Many Arapaho, particularly those in Chief Medicine Man's band, did not wish to reside among the Sioux "for fear of mixing themselves up with other tribes". Their peaceful stance and willingness to help American soldiers strained once strong relations between them and the Lakota and Cheyenne, who took an aggressive stance and fled the reservation. Attitudes towards the Arapaho from the "hostile" Lakota and Cheyenne were similar to the attitudes they had towards members of their own tribes which took similar peaceful stances and remained as "reservation Indians". Despite their unwillingness to take up the warpath, the Arapaho were unwilling to cede their territory, particularly the Black Hills area to which they have a strong spiritual attachment similar to the Lakota.

You have come here to speak with us about the Black Hills, and, without discussing anything that we say, and without changing anything that we say, we wish to tell the Great father [President of the United States] when you get back that this is the country in which we were brought up, and it has also been given to us by treaty by the great father. And I am here to take care of the country, and therefore, not only the Dakota [Sioux] Indians, but my people have an interest in the Black Hills that we have come to speak about today.

— Black Coal

During this time of great unrest, the tribe found itself deteriorating in leadership with many chiefs holding little sway among their bands. In order to regain strength as leaders and further negotiations for land in Wyoming, many chiefs and their warriors enlisted as army scouts for the United States and campaigned against their allies. Chief Sharp Nose, who was considered as influential and equal to Black Coal, was noted as "the inspiration of the battlefield ... He handled men with rare judgment and coolness, and was as modest as he was brave". Despite their overall stance as allies for the Americans, a handful of Arapaho warriors fought against the United States in key battles during the war.

Like in previous wars, the US recruited Indian warriors from tribes that were enemies with the Arapaho–Cheyenne–Lakota–Dakota alliance to act as Indian scouts, most notably from the Crow, Arikara, and Shoshone. Unlike previous conflicts involving the Lakota–Dakota–Cheyenne–Arapaho alliance and the United States, the Great Sioux War ended in a victory for the United States. The bison herds which were the center of life for the Indians were considerably smaller due to government-supported whole-scale slaughter in order to prevent collisions with railroads, conflict with ranch cattle, and to force nomadic plains Indians to adopt reservation life living off government handouts. Decreased resources and starvation was the major reason for the surrendering of individual Indian bands and the end of the Great Sioux War.

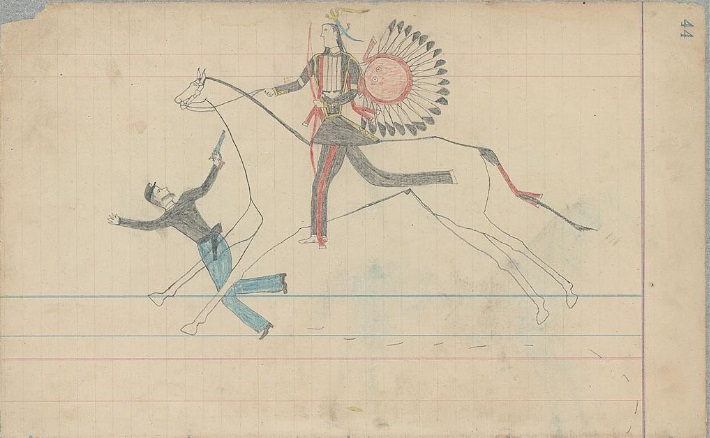
Ledger drawing of an Arapaho warrior riding down a U.S. soldier (1880)

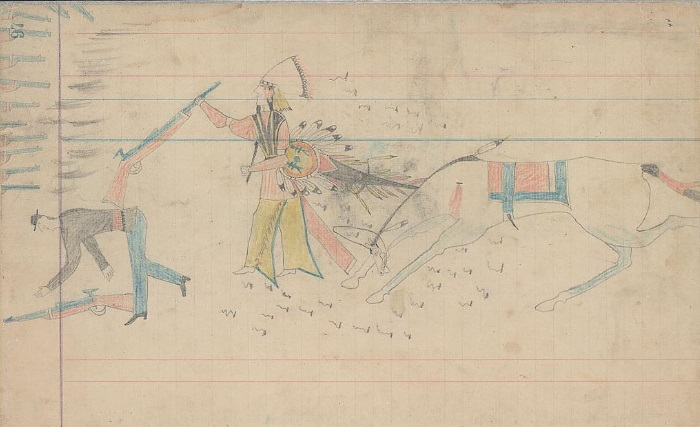
Ledger drawing of an Arapaho warrior with headdress, counting coup with rifle butt on a U.S. soldier.

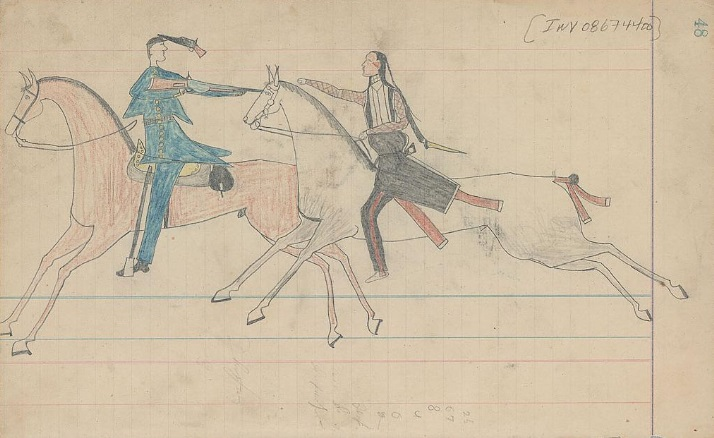
Ledger drawing of an Arapaho warrior in battle with a U.S. soldier on horseback.

The most significant battle of the war was the Battle of The Little Bighorn on June 25–26, 1876. The battle was fought between warriors from the Lakota, Cheyenne, and Arapaho (as well as individual Dakota warriors) and the 7th Cavalry Regiment of the US Army. The battle was fought along the Little Bighorn River in eastern Montana. The soldiers attempted to ambush the large camp of Indians along the river bottom despite the warnings from the Crow Scouts who knew that Custer severely underestimated the number of warriors in the camp. The US Seventh Cavalry, including the Custer Battalion, a force of 700 men led by George Armstrong Custer, suffered a severe defeat. Five of the Seventh Cavalry's companies were annihilated. The total US casualty count, including scouts, was 268 dead including Custer and 55 injured. Only five Arapaho were present at the battle and their presence was by chance. The Arapaho present were four Northern Arapaho warriors named Yellow Eagle, Yellow Fly, Left Hand, and Water Man. The fifth Arapaho was a Southern Arapaho named Well-Knowing One (Sage) but also known as Green Grass. The five Arapaho set out as a war party from near Fort Robinson to raid the Shoshone, but by chance came across a small party of young Sioux warriors. The Sioux thought that the Arapaho were United States Army Indian Scouts and invited them back to their camp along the Little Bighorn River, where they were captured and had their guns taken from them. The Lakota and Dakota threatened to kill the Arapaho, but the Cheyenne chief Two Moons recognized the men as Arapaho and ordered their release. The next day was the battle and, despite being viewed with suspicion, the five Arapaho actively fought in the battle. Water Man wore a large eagle feather headdress, a white shirt, beaded leggings, a breechcloth, and painted his face red and yellow during the battle. Water Man claimed killing one soldier while charging up the steep river banks but did not take his scalp because most Arapaho refused to take a scalp from someone with short hair. Water Man claimed to have watched Custer die.

When I reached the top of the hill I saw Custer. He was dressed in buckskin, coat and pants, and was on his hands and knees. He had been shot through the side and there was blood coming from his mouth. He seemed to be watching the Indians moving around him. Four soldiers were sitting up around him, but they were all badly wounded. All the other soldiers were down. Then the Indians closed in around him, and I did not see any more. Most of the dead soldiers had been killed by arrows, as they had arrows sticking in them. The next time I saw Custer he was dead, and some Indians were taking his buckskin clothes.

— Water Man

The Arapaho warrior Left Hand accidentally killed a Lakota warrior that he mistook for an Arikara scout, and despite further anger from the Lakota, left the battle alive along with the other four Arapaho. After the battle, the five Arapaho quietly slipped away and headed back to the Fort Robinson area.

== Culture ==
=== Creation story ===
The creation story of the Arapaho people shows a connection with the Algonquian people. Both cultures have an "earth-diver creation story". The Arapaho myth begins with a being called Flat Pipe (Se'iicooo) who exists alone upon the water. The Great Spirit suggests to Flat Pipe that he create creatures to build a world. He first conceives of ducks and other water birds who dive beneath the surface of the water but are not able to find land. With guidance from the Great Spirit, Flat Pipe creates a turtle who can live on both land or in the water. The Turtle dives and returns, spitting out a piece of land that grows into the earth. Flat Pipe then goes about creating men, women, and animals to populate the earth. The turtle is common to many "earth-diver" creation stories.

This story is an example of "creation by thought". Flat Pipe creates the creatures by thinking of them.

=== Gender and division of labor ===
Traditionally, men are responsible for hunting. After horses were introduced, buffalo became the main food source—the meat, organs, and the blood all being consumed. Blood was drunk or made into pudding. Women (and haxu'xan (Two Spirits)) are traditionally in charge of food preparation and dressing hides to make clothing and bedding, saddles, and housing materials.

=== Clothing ===
On the Plains, women (and haxu'xan) historically wore moccasins, leggings, and ankle-length buckskin-fringed dresses, ornamented with porcupine quills, paint, elk teeth, and beads. Men have also worn moccasins, leggings, buckskin breechclothes (drawn between the legs, tied around the waist), and sometimes shirts; warriors have often worn necklaces. Many of these items are still part of contemporary dress for both casual and formal wear, or as regalia.

== Economic development ==
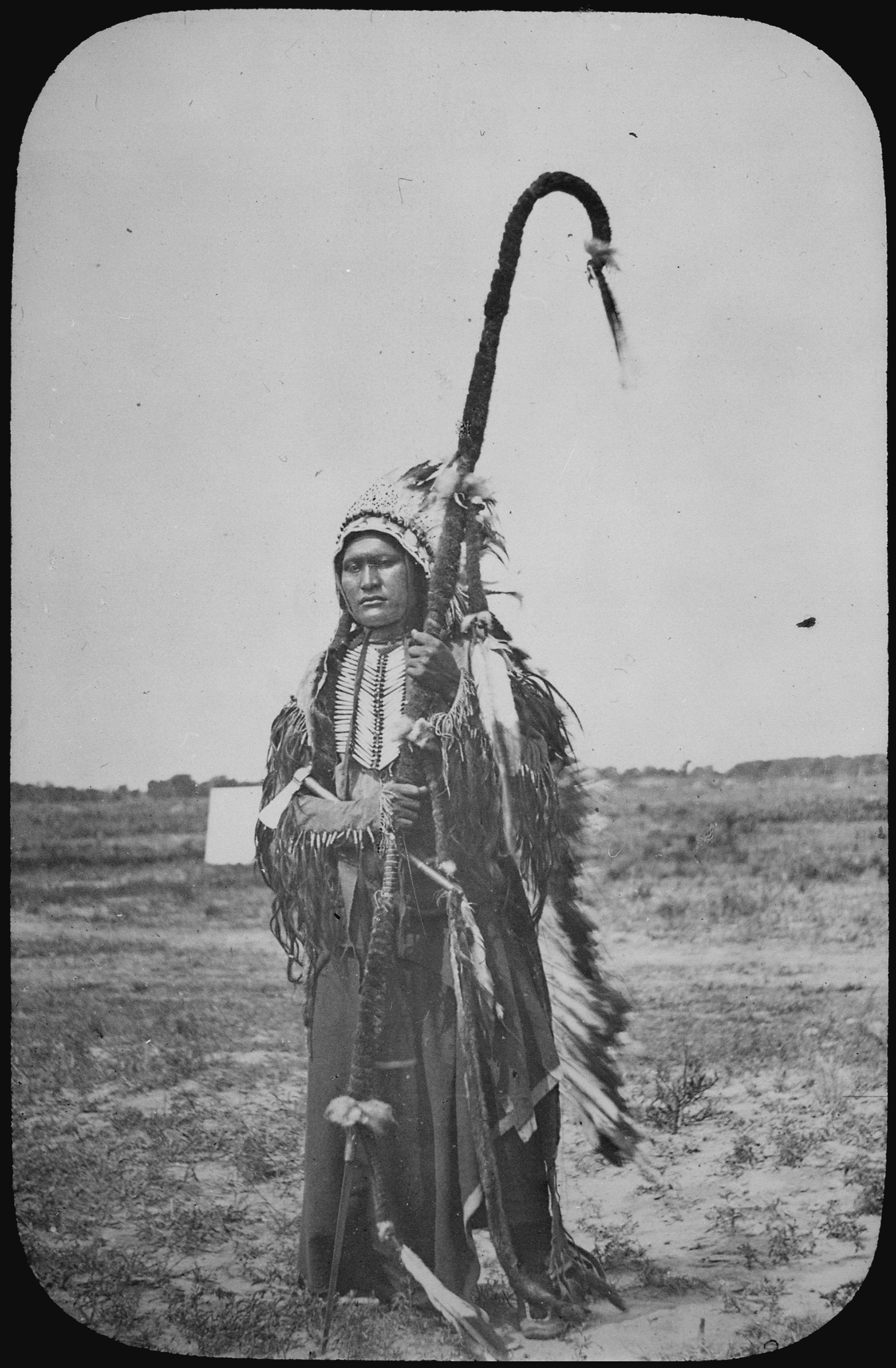
Chief Powder Face with war lance associated with the second dance ceremony (biitahanwu), 1864

In July 2005, Northern Arapahos won a contentious court battle with the State of Wyoming to get into the gambling or casino industry. The 10th Circuit Court ruled that the State of Wyoming was acting in bad faith when it would not negotiate with the Arapahos for gaming. The Northern Arapaho Tribe opened the first casinos in Wyoming. Presently, the Arapaho Tribe owns and operates high-stakes, Class III gaming at the Wind River Casino, the Little Wind Casino, and the 789 Smoke Shop and Casino. In 2012, The Wind River Hotel, which is attached to the Wind River Casino, features a cultural room called the Northern Arapaho Experience. They are regulated by a Gaming Commission composed of three tribal members.

Meanwhile, the Cheyenne and Arapaho Tribes operate four casinos in Oklahoma: the Lucky Star Casino in Clinton, the Lucky Star Casino in Watonga, the Feather Warrior Casino in Canton, and the newest casino which opened in 2018, the Lucky Star Casino in Hammon.

== Notable Arapahos ==
- Margaret Behan (born 1948), Arapaho-Cheyenne spiritual elder
- William "Hawk" Birdshead Philanthropist, Cheyenne and Arapaho Tribes of Oklahoma.
- Sherman Coolidge (Runs-on-Top) (1862–1932), Episcopal minister and educator in the Wind River community who was a founding member of the Society of American Indians.
- Mirac Creepingbear (1947–1990), Arapaho–Kiowa painter
- Viola Hatch (1930-2019), Arapaho activist
- Juanita L. Learned (1930-1996), first woman chair of the Cheyenne and Arapaho Tribes of Oklahoma
- Chief Little Raven (c. 1810–1889), negotiated peace between the Southern Arapaho and Cheyenne and the Comanche, Kiowa, and Plains Apache. He secured rights to the Cheyenne–Arapaho Reservation in Indian Territory.
- Chief Niwot (c. 1825 – 1864), led a band in Northern Colorado and died from wounds sustained during the Sand Creek Massacre.
- Pretty Nose (c. 1851 – after 1952), a war chief who participated in the Battle of the Little Bighorn
- Carl Sweezy (1881–1953), early professional Native American easel artist

== Population history ==
There are no references to the numbers of the Arapaho previous to the 19th century. M. R. Stuart in 1812 estimated the Arapaho at 3,050 warriors (therefore around 15,250 people). Jedidiah Morse in 1822 reported 10,000 Arrapahays, 7,000 Kaninavisch (another name for the Arapaho), 1,500 Castahana and 1,500 Pastanownas (possibly related tribes). Indian Affairs gave the Arapaho at 3,045 people in year 1880, 2,298 in year 1885, 1,925 in 1890, 1,869 in 1895, 1,782 in 1900, 1,768 in 1905 and 1,753 in 1910.

During the 20th and 21st centuries Arapaho population has rebounded and they numbered 12,192 in 2020.

== See also ==
- Arapaho language
- Cheyenne and Arapaho Tribes
- Wind River Indian Reservation

== General references ==
- Fowler, Loretta. Arapahoe Politics, 1851–1978: Symbols in Crises of Authority. University of Nebraska Press, 1982. ISBN 0-8032-1956-3.
- McDermott, John D. Circle of Fire: The Indian War of 1865. Mechanicsburg, PA: Stackpole Books, 2000.
- Pritzker, Barry M. A Native American Encyclopedia: History, Culture, and Peoples. Oxford: Oxford University Press, 2000. ISBN 978-0-19-513877-1.
- Waldman, Carl. Encyclopedia of Native American Tribes. New York: Checkmark Books, 2006. ISBN 0-8160-6273-0.
