= Friday (Arapaho chief) =

Chief and interpreter of Northern Arapaho

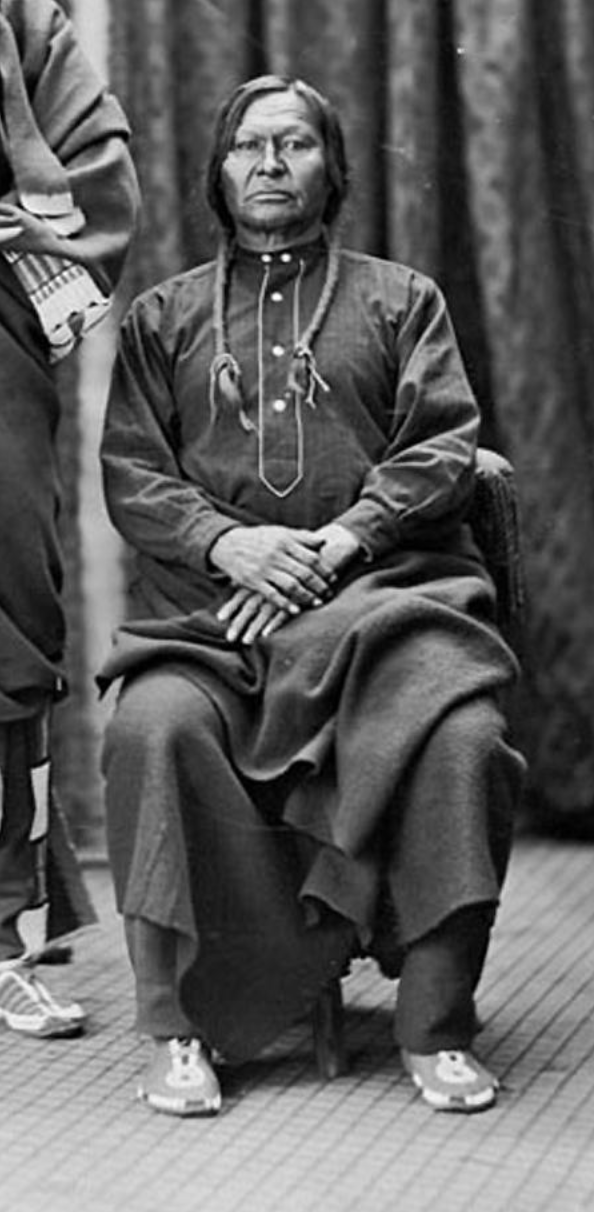
Friday in Washington (1873) by Alexander Gardner

Teenokuhu (Arapaho: Warshinun) (c. 1822–1881), popularly known as Chief Friday or Friday Fitzpatrick, was an Arapaho leader, translator, interpreter, and peacemaker who helped negotiate treaties and resolve cultural misunderstandings in the mid to late 19th century.

Called the "Arapaho American" by tribal members, he traveled with and translated for the explorers John C. Frémont in 1843 and Rufus Sage in the spring of 1844. He assisted Ferdinand V. Hayden during his surveying expedition and in the winter of 1859–1860 taught Hayden the Arapaho vocabulary. Friday became the leader of a band who were centered in the Cache la Poudre River area (near present-day Fort Collins, Colorado), but also ranged into Wyoming, Kansas and Nebraska. He made friends of white settlers in northern Colorado and secured jobs on farms and ranches for his tribal members after losing access to the Arapaho's traditional hunting grounds. After multiple attempts to establish a reservation for the Northern Arapaho in Colorado or Wyoming, Friday ultimately moved with his people to the Wind River Indian Reservation.

== Early years ==
Born in the early to mid 1820's to a band of Northern Arapaho Indians in what is now Northern Colorado, he was given the name 'Teenokuhuh', which means "sits meekly" in his native Arapaho tongue and also was called 'Warshinun' ("black spot" or "black coal ashes"). One day in 1831, when Teenokuhuh was just a boy, he and his band were camping next to the Cimarron River alongside a band of Gros Ventre (Atsina) Indians in what is today Dodge City, Kansas. A fight broke out which led to the Arapaho chief being stabbed; the Atsina chief was killed in retaliation. In the melee, Teenokuhuh and two boys were separated from their people and became lost in the Colorado Territory where they wandered for several days. They were eventually found by an Irish trapper, Thomas Fitzpatrick, with the Rocky Mountain Fur Company, who was in the area for an annual rendezvous. Fitzpatrick took Teenokuhuh under his wing, renaming him "Friday" (the day of the week Fitzpatrick found the boy) and enrolled him in a school in St. Louis. Friday learned fluent English as well as the ways of these relative newcomers who were slowly expanding into, and placing restrictions on, his own peoples’ land.

Friday went with Fitzpatrick into the frontier on his trapping journeys. He met other trappers who found him to have an "astonishing memory" and he was known for "his minute observation and amusing inquiries". At some point, Fitzpatrick was a United States Agent for the Arapaho.

== Arapaho leader and interpreter ==
=== Return to the Arapaho ===
In 1838, Fitzpatrick and Friday met up with a band of Arapaho people. When a woman recognized Friday as her son, he returned to his life with the Arapaho. Friday's life was centered in the Cache la Poudre River area (near present-day Fort Collins). A skilled hunter and warrior, Friday fought against the Ute, Shoshone, and Pawnee people.

Called the "Arapaho American" by tribal members, Friday was a translator and interpreter and was known as a peacemaker. The only English-speaking Arapaho from that time until his death in 1881, he traveled with and translated for the explorers John C. Frémont in 1843 and Rufus Sage in the spring of 1844, when Sage traveled along the Arkansas River (in southern Colorado).

=== Treaty of Fort Laramie of 1851 ===
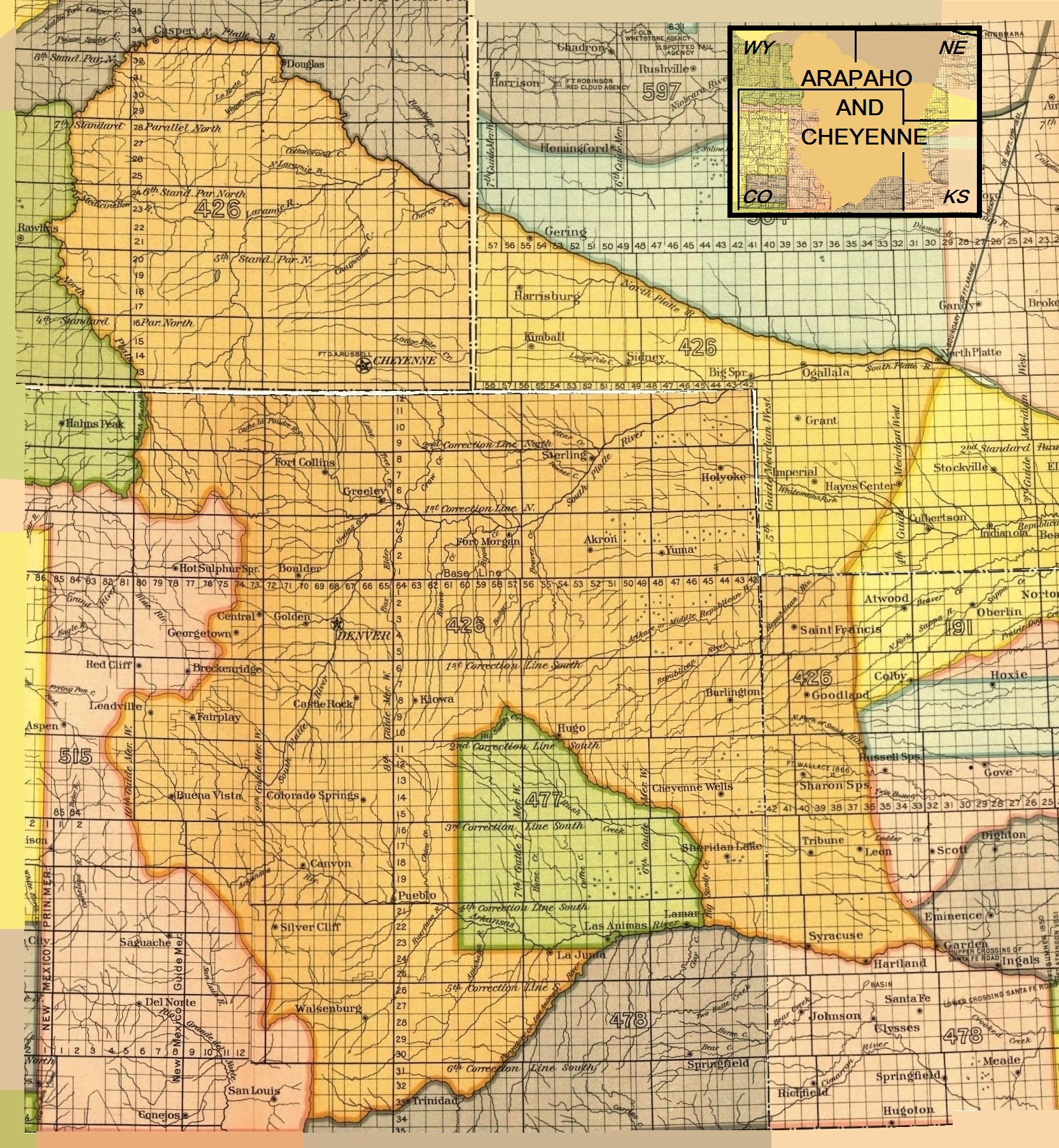
Arapaho and Cheyenne territory from the Treaty of Fort Laramie (1851)

Friday attended the treaty council at Fort Laramie, Wyoming in 1851. The Fort Laramie Treaty was completed and signed in October of that year. Friday was one of twenty-one Native American chiefs who signed the treaty. Among the stipulations, the Native Americans would be able to range through their ancestral homelands as long as they agreed to stop attacking non-native travelers and allowed the military to build forts and roads on the lands. During the negotiations, Friday left for Washington, D.C., with other Arapaho and Cheyenne delegates to resolve some concerns.

=== Interpreter ===
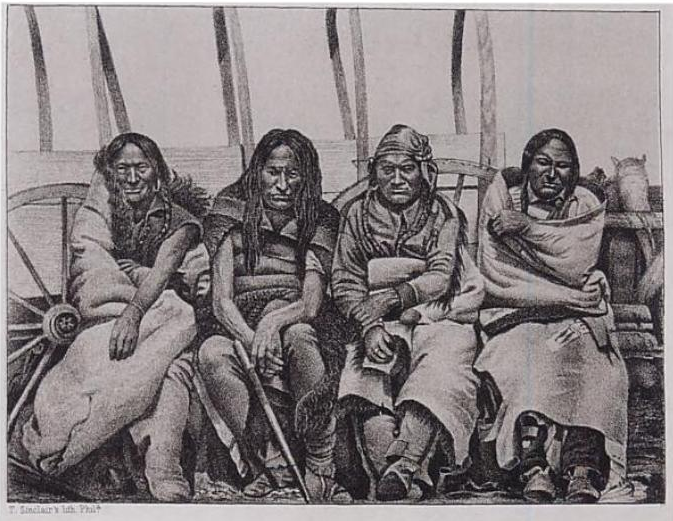
Principal Chiefs of Arapaho Tribe, engraving by James D. Hutton, ca. 1860. Arapaho interpreter Warshinun, also known as Friday, is seated at right.

In 1857, Friday was an interpreter when the Arapaho encountered Mormons in Wyoming. In 1859, he did the same when Little Owl's band visited a surveying party led by Ferdinand V. Hayden. Hayden learned the Arapaho vocabulary from Friday in the winter of 1859–1860, while on Deer Creek near present-day Laramie, Wyoming.

=== Forced out of Colorado ===
By the 1860s, the Arapaho were forced out of Colorado due to the influx of white people. A decisive event occurred in 1864 with the Sand Creek massacre, when more than 200 Arapaho and Cheyenne people were killed by the 1st Colorado Cavalry Regiment.

Friday's band diminished in size due to attacks by the United States Army, disease, and hunger. Their traditional hunting grounds were lost to white settlers. His band was just about 175 people in the late 1860s when they lived in northern Colorado along the Cache la Poudre. (Note: They often met at a 100 foot gnarled cottonwood tree, a Council Tree, where the Boxelder Creek met up with the Cache la Poudre. The land around the tree was homesteaded by Robert Strauss around 1860.) Friday's band was pushed out of Colorado Territory and north of the Platte River by governor Alexander Hunt in 1869. They went to the Tongue River. Friday's encampment was about 50 miles (80 km) from Fort Phil Kearny in Wyoming. They were joined by Black Bear's and Medicine Man's bands, who had also been pushed out of northern Colorado.

=== Treaty of Fort Laramie in 1868 ===
Friday was hired by government peace commissioners, which included Army generals led by General William T. Sherman and civilians, in early 1868 to communicate an ultimatum to the Northern Arapaho band that they would need to sign a treaty to continue to get provisions. The Northern Arapaho and Northern Cheyenne met at Fort Laramie and signed the Treaty of Fort Laramie on May 10, 1868. Black Bear, Little Wolf, Littlesheild, Medicine Man, and Sorrel Horse signed for the Northern Arahapo, who agreed to settle on one of three reservations in one year. Their options were with the Lakota people on the Missouri River, with southern Arapaho and Cheyenne people in Indian Territory (now Oklahoma), or with the Crow people on the Yellowstone River in Montana Territory. The Northern Arapaho wanted to stay in Wyoming and a meeting was held in October 1869 between Sorrel Horse, Medicine Man, and Friday with U.S. Army General Christopher Augur and Governor John Allen Campbell of the Wyoming Territory. Although the Shoshone had been their enemies, the Wind River Indian Reservation in Wyoming was their preferred new home. Shoshone Chief Washakie did not show up for the meeting but in February 1870, he agreed to let the Arapaho stay at the reservation temporarily.

=== Continued negotiations ===
Friday continued to negotiate for the Northern Arapaho to protect their traditional lands in Wyoming into the 1870s, even as his son became a scout for the United States Army. Friday's band folded in with other Northern Arapaho bands which left the Wind River reservation by the winter of 1870–1871, when they hunted amongst the scarce game in the Powder River Basin. Needing food, they drew provisions at the Red Cloud Agency near Fort Laramie in March 1871. Friday's band came to live among the Lakota at Red Cloud's reservation in Montana.

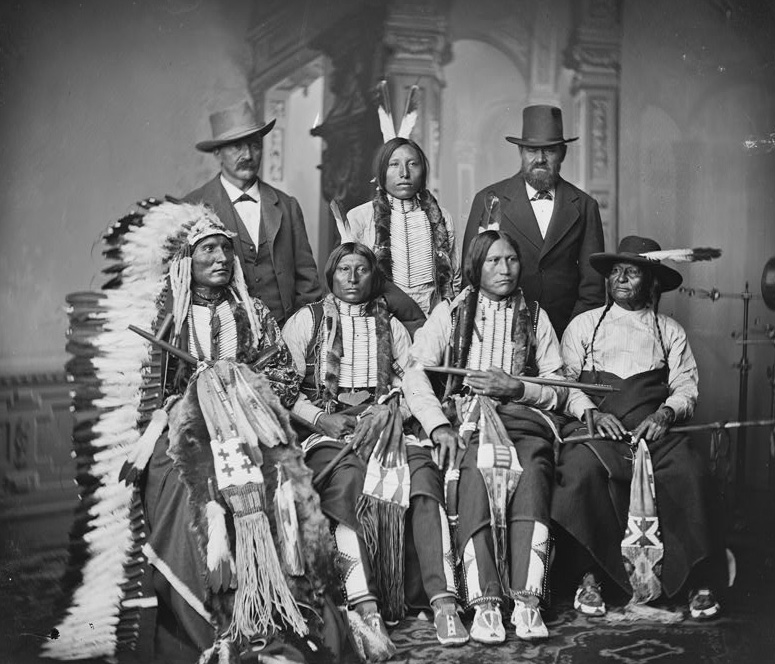
Arapahoes in Washington D.C. as part of the Sioux Delegation of 1877. Top Row, left to right: Antoine Janis, Young Spotted Tail, Joe Merrivale; seated: Touch-the-Clouds (Minnicouju Lakota), and Northern Arapaho leaders Sharp Nose, Black Coal, Friday.

Friday and other Northern Arapaho met with President Rutherford B. Hayes and Interior Secretary Carl Schurz in September 1877. It was Friday's last trip to Washington, D.C., where the leaders lobbied for a reservation for the Northern Arapaho in Wyoming. One month later the Northern Arapaho returned to the Wind River Indian Reservation, where they lived alongside the Shoshone. Friday lived at Wind River until his death on May 1881, perhaps near Fort Washakie.
