= Chief Black Coal =

Arapaho tribal leader

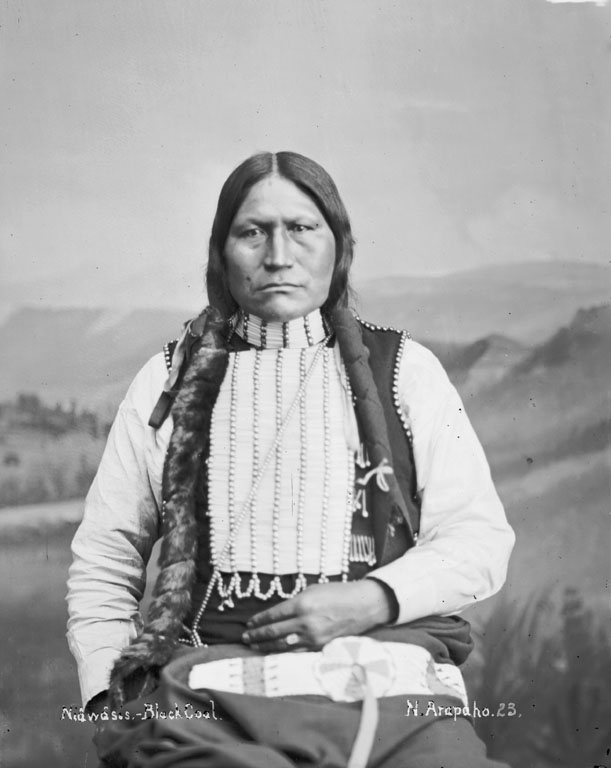
Wo’óoseinee’, known as Chief Black Coal and incorrectly identified as Niawasis in this photo, was among the most influential Arapaho chiefs of his time. Chief Black Coal was able to largely keep the Arapaho at peace with the United States during the Great Sioux war of 1876. He served as a U.S. Army scout and helped the tribe find a home on Wind River.

Wo’óoseinee’, known commonly as Black Coal (c. 1840 – 1893), was a prominent leader of the Northern Arapaho people during the latter half of the 19th century. Serving as an intermediary between the Northern Arapaho and the United States, he helped lead the transition from free-roaming life and armed resistance to American expansion, to alliance and eventual settlement alongside the Eastern Shoshone at today's Wind River Indian Reservation.

== Rise to leadership ==
Black Coal's name Wo’óoseinee’ refers to a story of him rolling in black ashes after a victory in a fight. He rose to prominence due to his war deeds in the 1860s in the Powder River Country, in which the Arapaho allied with war parties of the Lakota and Cheyenne. Black Coal fought in engagements like the July 1865 Battle of Platte Bridge in which Caspar Collins was killed, and the attack on Fort Phil Kearney in December 1866.

In 1865 at the Battle of the Tongue River soldiers attacked Northern Arapaho leader Black Bear's camp of 500 people and killed 35 warriors. Following this, the Arapaho grew increasingly unable to raise large war parties of their own. By the late 1860s, alliance and negotiation, rather than armed resistance, became the path for the Arapaho. Starting in 1868, Arapahos regularly enlisted as scouts in the U.S. Army. Black Coal would come to serve as a major intermediary role in carrying out the conciliatory strategy, keeping Arapahos out of conflict with the United States and the Shoshones as much as he was able. While he was initially lower status than chiefs like Black Bear and Medicine Man (also known as Sorrel Horse), their deaths in 1870 and 1871 left Black Coal to be regarded as the leader of the Antelopes nischéhiinenno, the largest band of Northern Arapahoes.

== Arapaho leadership ==
According to historian Loretta Fowler, leaders in the Northern Arapaho during the 1860s and 1870s did not rule by fiat or make decisions on an individual level. Instead, leaders were chosen by consensus of the tribe and with the blessing of the Water Pouring Old Men, ceremonial leaders who held the highest authority within the tribe. In this position, intermediary chiefs were expected to serve as go-betweens that could faithfully and powerfully argue for Arapaho interests and communicate Arapaho consensus to outsiders like U.S. Army generals, agency officials, and diplomats of the United States. This strategy helped to maintain Arapaho sovereignty and leadership structures, and also insulated ceremonial leaders from interactions with the United States. Fowler argues that this structure has persisted today in modified form, even as elected tribal council members act as the official political leadership of the Northern Arapaho, they are influenced by leadership of ceremonial elders.

The United States preferred to select "head chiefs" that could speak for all members of the tribe in negotiations. In this case, from 1871 Black Coal was considered the head Northern Arapaho chief by government officials, when in fact he had only the authority to speak the consensus of the tribe. Chief Sharp Nose was considered the second-ranking chief by government officials until Black Coal's death in 1893. In fact, Black Coal and Sharp Nose typically spoke the same consensus for their different bands.

== Intermediary chief ==
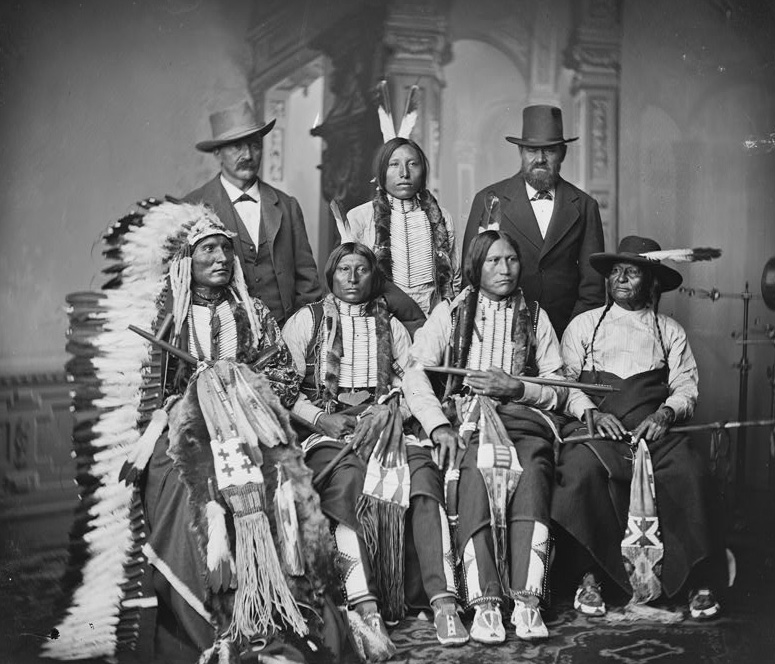
Arapahoes in Washington D.C. as part of the Sioux Delegation of 1877. Top Row, left to right: Antoine Janis, Young Spotted Tail, Joe Merrivale; seated: Touch-the-Clouds (Minnicouju Lakota), and Northern Arapaho leaders Sharp Nose, Black Coal, Friday.

Black Coal, along with Black Bear and Sorrel Horse, were Northern Arapaho signatories on the Treaty of Fort Laramie (1868), granting them rights to hunt north of the Platte River so long as game persisted. For the next few years, Black Coal alternately stayed near Red Cloud Agency, Fort Fetterman, and other posts to receive rations, and led his band on hunting expeditions.

Black Coal refused to join Lakotas and Cheyennes in attacking the Shoshone in the Wind River Basin in 1874. The U.S. Army was poised to strike the Shoshone's enemies, and through two Shoshone scouts located and attacked Black Coal's camp of up to 112 lodges and 600-700 people on Bates Creek, a tributary of Nowood Creek in the Bridger Mountains (Wyoming). The fight at Bates Battlefield resulted in the death of 18-34 Arapahoes. Seventeen lay dead in a pile in a deep ravine that cut through the center of the camp. Chief Black Coal had his horse shot out from under him. Sources disagree as to whether Black Coal had three fingers of his right hand shot off during this battle, or during a previous incident. However, only two missing fingers from this wound are in evidence in the 1877 photo of the Arapaho delegation to Washington D.C. After initially suffering heavy losses, the Arapaho climbed a bluff to the east of the creek and laid down heavy fire from behind the cover of limestone boulders, forcing the soldiers and Shoshones to withdraw. Captain Bates wrote that the battle would have been more successful had the Shoshones not commenced yelling their war whoops before the attack and spoiling the element of surprise. In this way, some of the Arapaho survivors may have survived because of the early warning they got from Shoshone war traditions. After this fight, some of the Arapahoes went south and stayed for several years, some going as far as Oklahoma. Black Coal moved to Pumpkin Butte and then located at Red Cloud Agency.

When the U.S. Army went into the field in 1876 to attack the Cheyenne at the beginning of the Great Sioux War, Black Coal's band was headed south to Fort Fetterman on March 1, signaling their peaceful intent. Black Coal enlisted as a U.S. Army scout during this period, to secure higher status within the tribe, rations, Army pay, and hopefully the favor of U.S. Army officials that could bolster their case for securing a permanent reservation for the Northern Arapaho. Sharp Nose, leader of another band of Northern Arapaho, was chief of the Arapaho Scouts and served with Colonel Ranald S. Mackenzie at the November 25, 1876 Dull Knife Fight on the Red Fork of Powder River that broke the resistance of the Northern Cheyenne.

Seeking a permanent home for the Arapaho, Black Coal traveled to visit the Southern Arapaho Reservation on the Canadian River in Oklahoma in 1876, but found the location unsuitable. In 1877, Black Coal, along with Sharp Nose and interpreter Friday, went to Washington D.C. as part of a delegation that met President Rutherford B. Hayes. The goal of the delegation was to secure a permanent home for the Arapaho that would not be along the Missouri River or in Oklahoma Territory, a land Black Coal described as "sickly." Black Coal's speeches from this event show his mastery of persuasive speaking, arguing that the Arapaho would readily participate in farming and other "civilizing" programs in exchange for "good land" where they could farm. Within months, the United States was seeking permission of the Shoshones to locate the Arapahoes on the Sweetwater River, south of the Shoshone agency.

The Northern Arapaho were later resettled on the Shoshone reservation, to be closer to the agency where they could receive rations. For the rest of his life, Black Coal worked to solidify this informal arrangement and codify Arapaho rights to live on Wind River.

== Settling on the reservation at Wind River ==
Black Coal was leader of the Antelope Band of Northern Arapahoes, numbering about 700 people. They located principally near the forks of the Wind River and the Popo Agie River, leading other members of the tribe to refer to them as the "Forks of the River People" or nóonó'owú'unénno. Today this community is known as "Arapahoe" and is located near the St. Stephens Mission and the city of Riverton, Wyoming. Black Coal converted to Catholicism and lent his support to missionary efforts.

Sharp Nose's band located near today's village of Ethete, while Friday's band located on Trout Creek.

== Death ==
Black Coal died at age 53 on July 10, 1893. He was buried on the bluffs west of St. Stephen's Mission. A monument placed at the grave carries the inscription, "Erected by the Northern Arapahoes in honor of a brave and honest man".

== Return of Black Coal's headdress ==
In December 2019, retired professor Temple Smith of Marblehead, Massachusetts contacted the Black Coal Senior Center and the Northern Arapaho Tribal Historic Preservation Office to inquire about returning Black Coal's headdress to the Northern Arapaho. Smith's great-grandfather was a dentist in Buffalo, Wyoming who had traveled to the Wind River country in the 1870s or 1880s, where he had done dental work on Black Coal's teeth. The chief gave an eagle feather headdress to the dentist as a token of thanks. The Smith family held onto the headdress for more than a century, storing it in their attic, until a delegation from the Northern Arapaho arrived to repatriate the headdress in January 2020. After driving the headdress back to Wyoming, the item was treated at the University of Wyoming Archaeological Repository with a freezing process to kill any insects or microbes.

A cedaring ceremony was held at the Native American Center on the University of Wyoming Campus on January 27, 2020, in which Northern Arapaho Council Member Sam Dresser prayed over the headdress and it was cedared in the four directions, in preparation for the final return of the headdress to the Wind River Indian Reservation.
