= Battle of the Tongue River =

Coordinates: 44.905542°N 107.162704°W

- Part of the Indian Wars
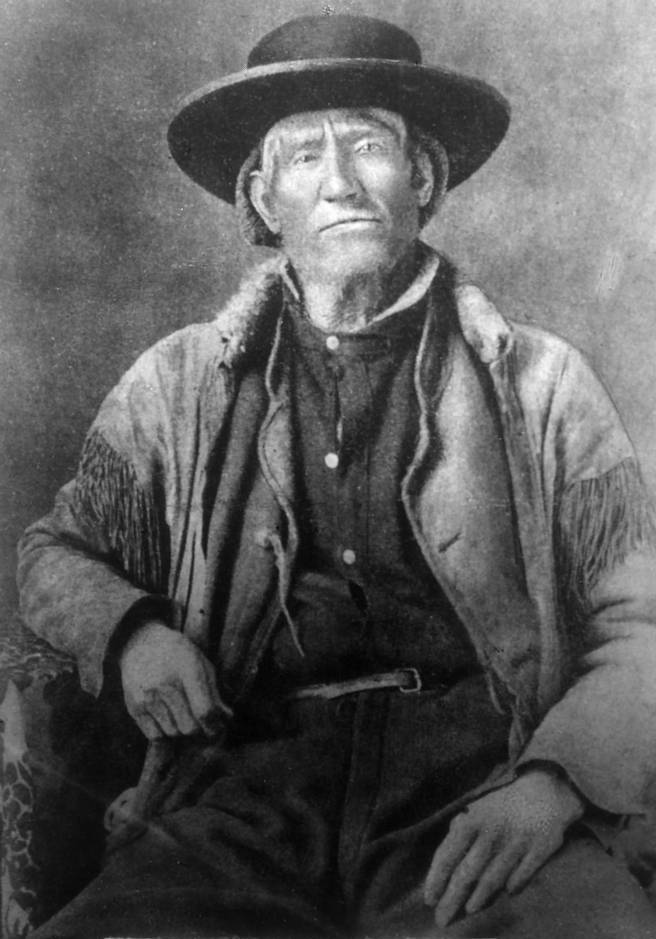
- Portrait of Jim Bridger
Date	August 29, 1865
Location	northern Dakota Territory, present-day Sheridan County, Wyoming
Result	U.S. victory

Belligerents
United States	Arapaho Indians

Commanders and leaders
Patrick E. Connor; Jim Bridger; Frank North	Medicine Man

Strength
200 soldiers, 70 Indian scouts two artillery pieces	500, including women and children

Casualties and losses
2 killed 6 wounded	~ 35–63 killed, including women and children 18 women and children captured

- Connor Battlefield
- U.S. National Register of Historic Places
- Location within Wyoming Location within the United States
- Location: City park on the Tongue River, Ranchester, Wyoming
- Area: 1.2 acres (0.49 ha)
- Built: 1865
- NRHP reference No.: 71000891
- Added to NRHP: August 12, 1971

The Battle of the Tongue River, sometimes referred to as the Connor Battle, was an engagement of the Powder River Expedition that occurred on August 29, 1865. In the battle, U.S. soldiers and Indian scouts attacked and destroyed an Arapaho village.

== Background ==
Major General Grenville M. Dodge assumed command of the Department of the Missouri in 1865. Dodge ordered a punitive campaign to suppress the Cheyenne, Sioux, and Arapaho Indians who had been raiding overland mail routes, wagon trains, and military posts along the Oregon and Overland trails. He gave tactical command of the Powder River Expedition, as it was called, to Brigadier General Patrick Edward Connor, commander of the District of Utah.

The expedition was a multi-pronged affair involving 2,600 soldiers, civilians, and Indian scouts. Three columns of soldiers were to descend upon the Powder River Country of Wyoming and Montana, unite, and "make vigorous war upon the Indians and punish them so that they will be forced to keep the peace." Connor was in overall command and led the westernmost or left prong of the expedition. The forces under his direct command consisted of 380 soldiers: 6 companies of the 6th Michigan Cavalry, Company F of the 7th Iowa Cavalry, and Companies E and K of the 11th Ohio Cavalry. Also included were civilian guides headed by mountain man Jim Bridger, 95 Pawnee scouts under Captain Frank J. North, 84 Omaha and Winnebago scouts under Captain E. W. Nash, and 195 civilian teamsters. Connor left Fort Laramie on July 30, 1865, marching north. He established a fort on the upper Powder River which he named Fort Connor (later renamed Fort Reno) and left some of his men there to staff the fort.

== The battle ==
Jim Bridger saw the smoke of an Indian village and Connor sent out Frank North and two Pawnees to find the village. On August 28, the scouts reported back that they had found the village about 35 miles west of Connor's force. Connor quickly collected his most mobile soldiers, consisting of about 200 soldiers with two mountain howitzer cannon and 40 Omaha and Winnebago and 30 Pawnee scouts, and marched that night toward the village. With Bridger leading them, they reached the village about eight a.m. the next morning.

The soldiers charged the village, having achieved complete surprise. The howitzers pounded the village while the soldiers rushed in, catching the Indians unprepared. In the melee, there was a great deal of indiscriminate firing and women and children were killed as well as warriors. The village, led by Black Bear and Medicine Man, had about 500 inhabitants. Many of the men were absent for a raid on the Crow along the Big Horn River, leaving mostly old men, women, and children in the village. After the initial attack the few able warriors in the village put up an effective defense, retreating about twelve miles up Wolf Creek while covering the flight of the women and children.

Most of the soldiers remained in the village to loot and burn the tipis, but Connor and about 30 men, including 15 Pawnee, pursued the retreating Arapaho. The Arapaho counterattacked and Connor, his horses spent, was forced to retreat back to the village. The soldiers there completed their work of destruction as the Indians harassed them from a distance, attempting to re-capture their horse herd. The soldiers abandoned the destroyed village about 2:30 that afternoon, North and the Pawnee leading and driving before them more than 500 captured horses. The Arapaho persisted in their attacks but were unable to re-capture the horses, eventually giving up the effort. At 3 a.m. the next morning, the soldiers reached their starting point, having covered more than 70 miles and fought a battle in less than 36 hours.

== Casualties ==
Connor claimed to have killed 63 Arapaho warriors and wounded many more, although a large number of casualties occurred among the Arapaho women and children. Private Little Bird of the Omaha Scouts was killed, and Acting Sergeant Charles M. Latham of the Signal Corps was mortally wounded, while six men, including Second Lieutenant Oscar Jewett, were wounded. Connor singled out four Winnebago, including the chief, Little Priest, along with North and 15 Pawnee for bravery. He strictly forbade looting, and the next day ordered all the property collected during the occupation of the village burned, and had the captured women and children released.

== Aftermath ==
The Arapaho were apparently not cowed by the destruction of one of their villages. Two days later, they killed Captain Osmer F. Cole of the 6th Michigan Cavalry, commander of the military escort for the Sawyers Expedition. The next day, on September 1, 1865, 100 or more Arapaho attacked the well-armed Sawyers train of 60 ox wagons along the Tongue River under the command of James A. Sawyers. They killed two men, wounded several more, stole livestock, and kept the wagon train under siege for two weeks until General Connor's soldiers rescued it. The effectiveness of the Arapaho attack was limited by their shortage of powder for their muskets, and many of the bullets they fired failed to penetrate the skin of either men or oxen. (See Sawyers Fight)

== Officers in the Engagement ==
- Brigadier General Patrick E. Connor
- Captain Nicholas J. O'Brien, Company F, 7th Iowa Cavalry
- Captain Jacob L. Humphreyville, Company K, 11th Ohio Cavalry
- Captain Edwin R. Nash, Omaha and Winnebago Scouts
- Captain Frank J. North, Pawnee Scouts
- Second Lieutenant Oscar Jewett, Company D, 1st Nevada Cavalry (wounded)

== Order of battle ==
United States Army, Powder River Expedition, August 29, 1865.

Expedition	Column	Regiments and Others
Powder River Expedition, Brigadier General Patrick E. Connor, commanding.	Left, Western Column Colonel James H. Kidd (not present, at Fort Connor)	7th Iowa Volunteer Cavalry, (Detachment of Company F, several men): Captain Nicholas J. O'Brien; 11th Ohio Volunteer Cavalry, (Detachment of Company K, 40 men): Captain Jacob L. Humphreyville; Pawnee Scouts (30 men): Captain Frank J. North; Omaha and Winnebago Scouts (40 men): Captain Edwin R. Nash; United States Signal Corps, (Detachment, several men): Acting Sergeant Charles M. Latham (mortally wounded); Mountain Howitzer Section, (2 Cannon): Captain Nicholas J. O'Brien; Civilians and Guides: Jim Bridger
Powder River Expedition, Brigadier General Patrick E. Connor, commanding.	Central, Middle Column Lieutenant Colonel Samuel Walker	not present, on Powder River
Powder River Expedition, Brigadier General Patrick E. Connor, commanding.	Right, Eastern Column Colonel Nelson D. Cole	not present, on Powder River

Native Americans

Native Americans	Tribe	Leaders
Native Americans	Arapaho	Black Bear, not present; Medicine Man

== The Battlefield today ==
A portion of the battlefield is preserved by the Connor Battlefield State Historic Site in Ranchester, Wyoming. It is listed on the National Register of Historic Places.

== See also ==
- Powder River Expedition
- Battle of Platte Bridge
- Red Cloud's War
- Wyoming Historical Landmarks
