= Sawyers Fight =

- Part of the Powder River War, Sioux Wars
Date	31 August – 13 September 1865
Location	Sheridan County, Wyoming
Result	Standoff

Belligerents
United States	Arapaho Indians

Commanders and leaders
James A. Sawyers	Unknown

Strength
Civilian surveyors detachment of 6th Michigan Cavalry	Unknown

Casualties and losses
3 killed	0

The Sawyers Fight was part of a surveying expedition in late 1865 to improve the emigrant trails from Nebraska to Montana. Not a military venture, the expedition was named for and led by James A. Sawyers. The expedition was attacked by Arapaho warriors in retribution for losses at the battle of the Tongue River.

== Background ==
In 1865 Congress approved an expedition to build a road from the Niobrara River to Virginia City, Montana. Secretary of the Interior James Usher appointed Lt. Col. James A. Sawyers head of this expedition with a military escort of two companies of "Galvanized Yankees" of the 5th U.S. Volunteer Infantry. At roughly the same time General Patrick E. Connor launched his Powder River Expedition. Sawyers moved his expedition north from the confluence of the Niobrara and Missouri Rivers despite Connor's warnings against moving into hostile Indian territory in the midst of a military expedition. Sawyers was ambushed at Bone Pile Creek near Gillette, Wyoming and was forced to seek refuge at Fort Connor.

== The Fight ==
Colonel James H. Kidd, commander at Fort Connor, detached a portion of the 6th Michigan Volunteer Cavalry Regiment as a new escort for Sawyers to continue his expedition. Sawyers left the fort and followed the military road recently blazed by General Connor's troops until it intersected with the Bozeman Trail. On August 31, Captain Osmer Cole from the 6th Michigan was killed by Arapaho warriors. Sawyers’ wagon train nevertheless continued to a ford on the Tongue River and began crossing September 1. Unbeknownst to Sawyers, just a few miles from the ford, Connor had attacked the Arapaho of Chief Black Bear just 4 days prior. As the wagons crossed the river, Arapaho warriors attacked and scattered the expedition's cattle herd. The cavalry unlimbered a howitzer while Sawyers corralled the wagons. The Arapaho appeared to have left and Sawyers continued along the trail but was attacked a second time. Retreating to the river they were attacked trying to find an alternate route downstream. Heading back upstream Sawyers corralled the wagons, but two members of his team were killed and he decided to move and corral his wagons for a third time. Sawyers was in desperate measures by nightfall. The next morning the Arapaho leaders met with Sawyers. The Arapaho had been part of the group recently attacked by General Connor and believed Sawyers’ expedition was military reinforcements. The Arapaho chiefs stated Connor's troops had captured their ponies and they wanted them back. The Arapaho and Sawyers agreed to send 3 men each to find Connor. While the Arapaho were hoping to have their animals back, Sawyers was looking for military reinforcements to continue his expedition. For several days Sawyers’ men and the Arapaho faced off at each other through bad weather. On September 12 with no word from Connor the men of Sawyer’ expedition mutinied and replaced Sawyers in command. Under new command the expedition broke away from the Arapaho and began its return to Fort Connor on September 13.

== Aftermath ==
The withdrawal did not last long as reinforcements sent from Connor arrived along the road back to Fort Connor under the command of Captain Albert E. Brown. With Brown's help Sawyers reasserted his authority over the expedition and turned back toward Virginia City. This third attempt to reach Virginia City encountered almost no hostile Natives.

A battlefield monument stands along U.S. Route 14 in Wyoming near Dayton.

== Sources ==
Doyle, Susan Journeys to the Land of Gold: Emigrant Diaries from the Bozeman Trail, 1863-1866 2000 Johnson, Dorothy M. The Bloddy Bozeman: The Perilous Trail to Montana's Gold 1983
