= 6th Michigan Cavalry Regiment =

- Michigan state flag
- Active: May 28, 1862, to November 24, 1865
- Country: United States
- Allegiance: Union
- Branch: Cavalry
- Engagements: American Civil War: Battle of Hanover; Battle of Hunterstown; Battle of Gettysburg; Battle of Williamsport; Kilpatrick's Raid on Richmond; Battle of the Wilderness; Battle of Yellow Tavern; Battle of Cedar Creek; Battle of Five Forks; Appomattox; American Indian Wars: Powder River Expedition; Sawyers Fight

The 6th Michigan Cavalry Regiment was a cavalry regiment that served in the Union Army during the American Civil War. It was a part of the famed Michigan Brigade, commanded for a time by Brigadier General George Armstrong Custer.

== Service ==
The 6th Michigan Cavalry was organized at Grand Rapids, Michigan, from May 28 to October 13, 1862, and mustered on October 13, 1862. Among the officers who later joined the regiment as replacements were Thomas W. Custer, who would earn two Medals of Honor while serving with the 6th in the spring of 1865.

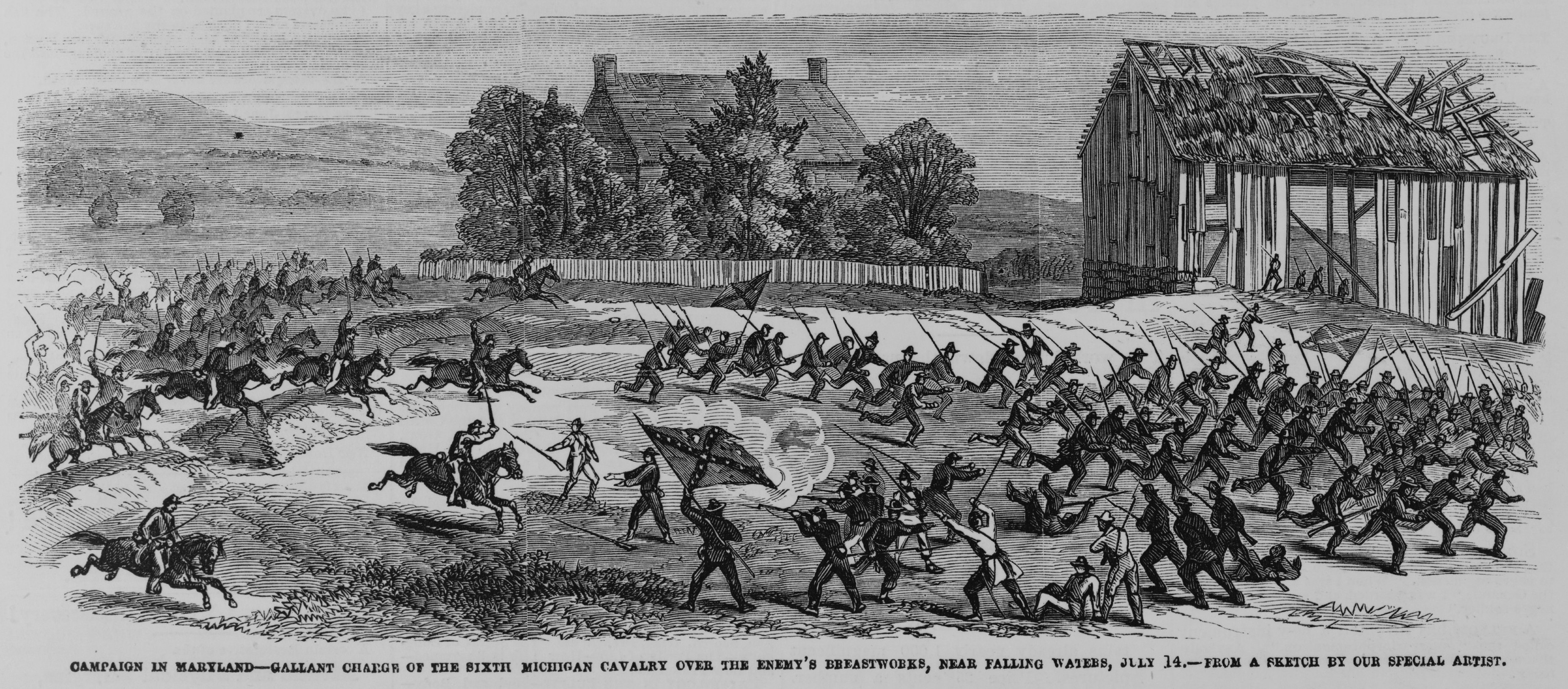
Campaign in Maryland - Gallant charge of the Sixth Michigan Cavalry over the enemy's breastworks, near Falling Waters, July 14, 1863

The regiment was assigned to what became the Michigan Brigade during the early part of the Gettysburg campaign in June 1863. It saw its first actions under General Custer at the Hanover, Hunterstown, and Gettysburg. Armed with Spencer Repeating Rifles, the 6th provided superior firepower against the lightly armed Confederate cavalry.

Sent out to the Old West frontier following the cessation of hostilities in mid-1865, the 6th, commanded by Colonel James H. Kidd and under the overall command of Brigadier General Patrick Connor constructed "Fort Connor" as a supply depot during the Powder River Expeditions of that summer. A detachment of the regiment guarding James A. Sawyers wagon train participated in the Sawyers Fight of August and September, 1865. The regiment was mustered out of service on November 24, 1865.

== Total strength and casualties ==
The regiment suffered 7 officers and 128 enlisted men killed in action or mortally wounded and 251 enlisted men who died of disease, for a total of 386 fatalities.

== Commanders ==
- Colonel George Gray
- Lieutenant Colonel Henry Elmer Thompson
- Major James Harvey Kidd, promoted to colonel

== See also ==
- List of Michigan Civil War Units
- Michigan in the American Civil War
