= Kim Douglas Wiggins =

American painter

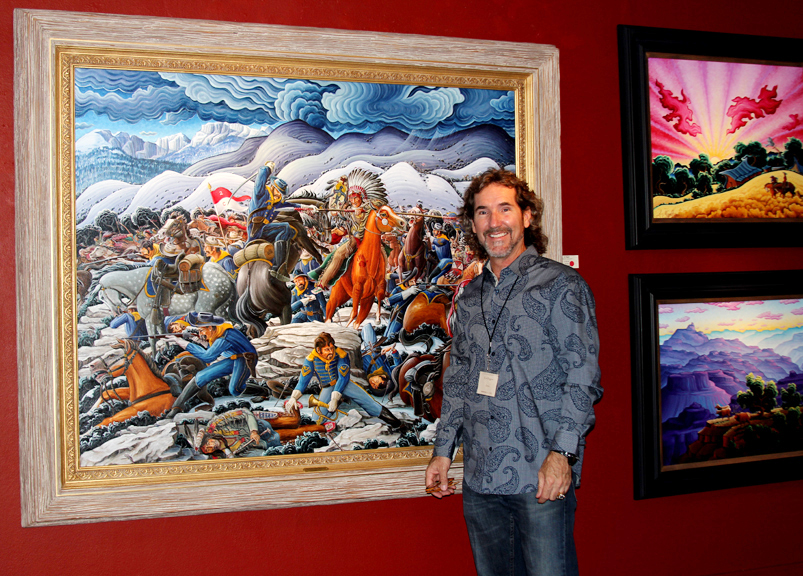
- Kim Wiggins with Fetterman Massacre
- Born: April 8, 1959 (age 67); Roswell, New Mexico
- Known for: Painting, sculpture

Kim Douglas Wiggins (born April 8, 1959) is an American painter and sculptor best known for his expressionist landscapes and historical imagery of the American West. His work was recently seen in November 2007 in a solo exhibition at Altermann Galleries in New York City, as well as numerous exhibitions at the Autry National Center in Los Angeles. Additionally, a collection of Wiggins's work depicting the history of California has been exhibited at the Staples Center in Los Angeles since opening in 1999.

== Biography ==
Kim Wiggins was raised on a ranch in southern New Mexico and began his art career sculpting miniatures of the wildlife around him. In 1985 Wiggins was admitted as the youngest member of a national American impressionists society. His father, Walt Wiggins, was a noted writer and photojournalist who traveled the world on assignment for major magazines like Sports Illustrated, Argosy and Look. Wiggins draws upon Postimpressionism, Expressionism, American Regionalism, muralist folk art traditions, and it is this union that makes his paintings truly unique and unexpected. This collection of Wiggins's work is used as the backdrop for many of the backstage interviews at the Grammys which are held yearly at the Staples Center.

== Published works ==
Wiggins's work is included in the books:

- Art of the American West
- Art of the American West
- Davenport's Art Reference & Price Guide 2009/2010 Edition
- American Artists at Auction: The Franklin & James Decade Review 1991-2001
- Painters and the American West, Yale University Press
- K. Douglas Wiggins: A Sense of Place, A Sense of Spirit.
- Booth Western Art Museum (Works from the Permanent Collection)
- The Trail of the Painted Ponies
- Leonard's Annual Price Index, Volume 15
- Davenport's Art Reference & Price Guide, 13th Edition
- Enchanted Lands – The Mission
- Who's Who in the World (14th Edition), Marquis Who's Who
- Who's Who in American Art 1997/1998(22nd Edition), Marquis Who's Who

== Exhibitions ==
Wiggins has exhibited with:

- Other Side of the West
- Pennsylvania Academy of the Fine Arts
- National Society of American Impressionists
- Museum of New Mexico
- M. H. de Young Memorial Museum
- Denver Art Museum

Wiggins exhibits yearly at the Masters of the American West show held at the Autry National Center in Los Angeles, CA. His work is included in the permanent collections of the Museum of New Mexico, the Anschutz collection, Denver, CO; the Staples Center, Los Angeles, CA; the Booth Western Art Museum, Cartersville, GA; and the Autry National Center, Los Angeles, CA. His work was recently included in Painters and the American West, an exhibition that traveled from the Denver Art Museum to the Corcoran Gallery of Art, The Joslyn Art Museum, and the Art Institute of Chicago. He is also listed in the Artist's Bluebook of 34,000 North American Artists.

Wiggins is represented by Manitou Galleries, Santa Fe, New Mexico. Giclee reproductions of his unique work are available through Greenwich Workshop dealers.
