= Black Bear (chief) =

Arapaho leader (died 1870)

Black Bear (Arapaho: Wo'teenox; died April 8, 1870) was an Arapaho leader into the 1860s when the Northern Arapaho, like other Native American tribes, were prevented from ranging through their traditional hunting grounds due to settlement by European-Americans who came west during the Pike's Peak Gold Rush. Conflicts erupted over land and trails used by settlers and miners. A watershed event was the Sand Creek massacre of 1864. This led to the Northern Arapaho joining with other tribes to prevent settlement in their traditional lands. In 1865, Black Bear's village was attacked during the Battle of the Tongue River. People died, lodges were set on fire, and food was ruined, all of which made it difficult for them to survive as a unit. He died during an ambush by white settlers on April 8, 1870, in the Wild Wind Valley of present-day Wyoming.

== Background ==
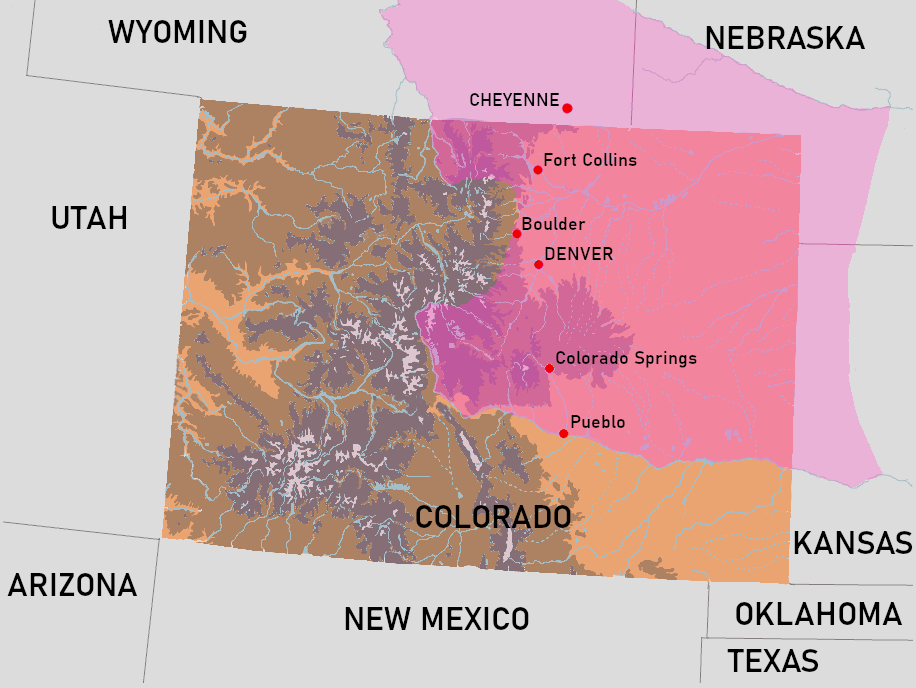
This map illustrates the approximate territory of the Arapaho and Cheyenne tribes following the Treaty of Fort Laramie in 1851. The North Platte River and Arkansas River acted as the northern and southern border of this territory, respectively.

In the 19th century, the Arapahoes ranged north of the Arkansas River and east from the Medicine Bow Mountains of the Rocky Mountains and north and east into the plains. In the 1820s or the 1830s, at the beginning of contact with European-Americans, the Arapaho divided into Northern and Southern tribes based upon trading sources. British, French, and American trading posts were established north of the Arkansas River. Below that, Native Americans traded in the southwest with the Spanish (Santa Fe de Nuevo México), where it was easier to trade for horses. There were four bands of Northern Arapaho who ranged separately for food and came together for ceremonies, such as Sun Dance.

In 1851, the Fort Laramie Treaty was negotiated between Native Americans of the Western United States and the United States government. Native Americans, including the Arapaho, negotiated to protect their hunting grounds and buffalo herds. The United States government negotiated to protect settlers who moved westward into or through traditional native lands, and along westward trails such as the Oregon Trail. The Arapaho sought to abide by the treaty, but they suffered from starvation due to the sharp reduction of buffalo herds. There was a huge influx of settlers with the Gold Rush into the Rocky Mountains. The United States government's strategy was to put Native Americans on reservations and convert them to agrarian and Christian societies.

In 1859, Medicine Man, a leader of a band of Northern Arapaho and negotiator for the other Northern Arapaho bands, stated that "our sufferings are increasing every year… Our horses, too are dying because we ride them so far to get a little game for our Lodges. We wish to live…" Medicine Man and Black Bear were considered "the two most important Northern Arapaho leaders" of the time. Friday, another Arapaho leader, was a good interpreter who helped negotiate with the United States government.

== Sand Creek massacre ==
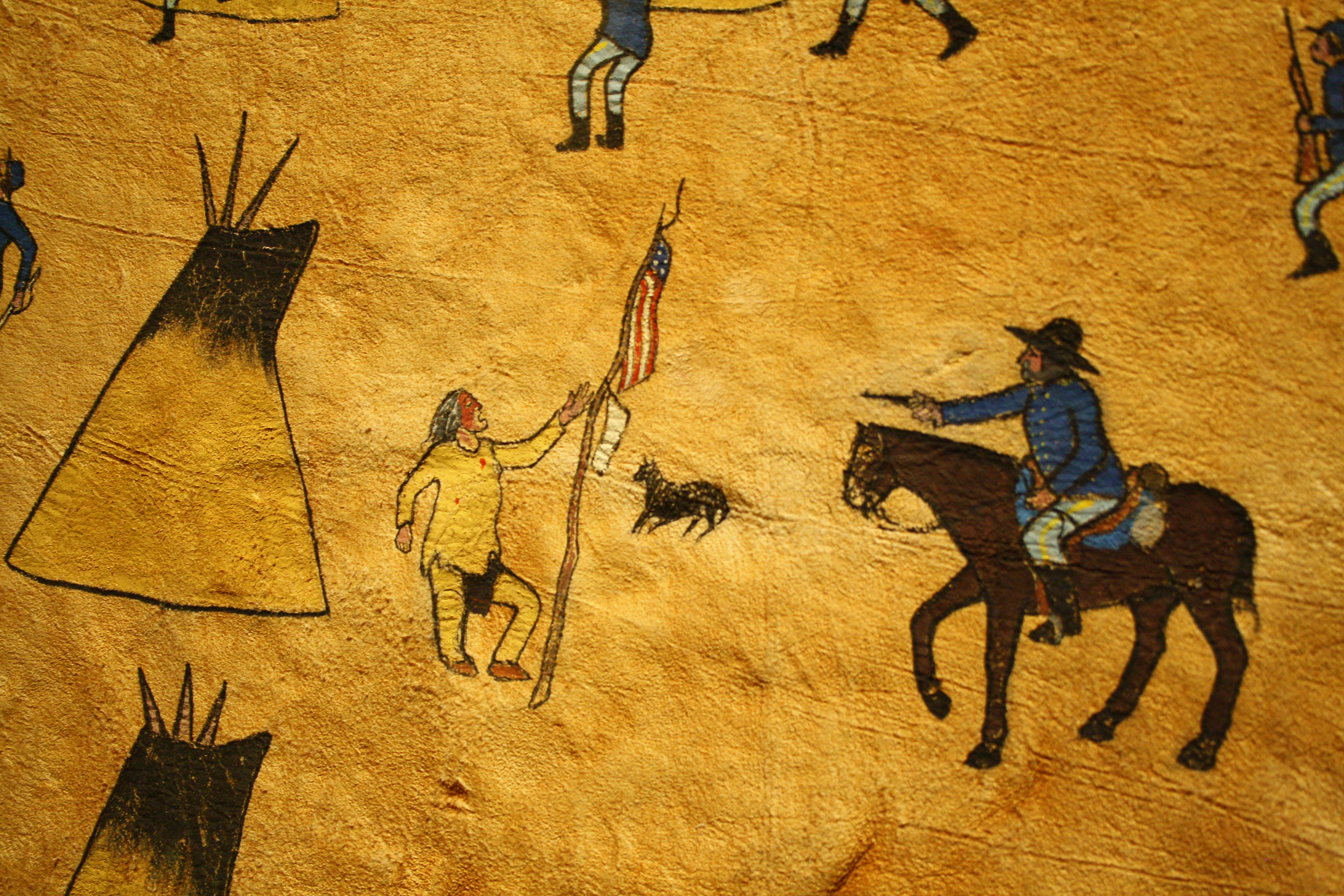
Black Kettle at Sand Creek massacre on November 29, 1864

A peaceful Arapaho and Cheyenne village on Sand Creek in eastern Colorado was attacked by Colorado troops in late 1864. About 200 people, mostly women and children, were massacred. In retaliation, Arapaho, Cheyenne, and Lakota people began fighting against Euro-Americans on the westward trails.

== Clashes due to westward expansion ==
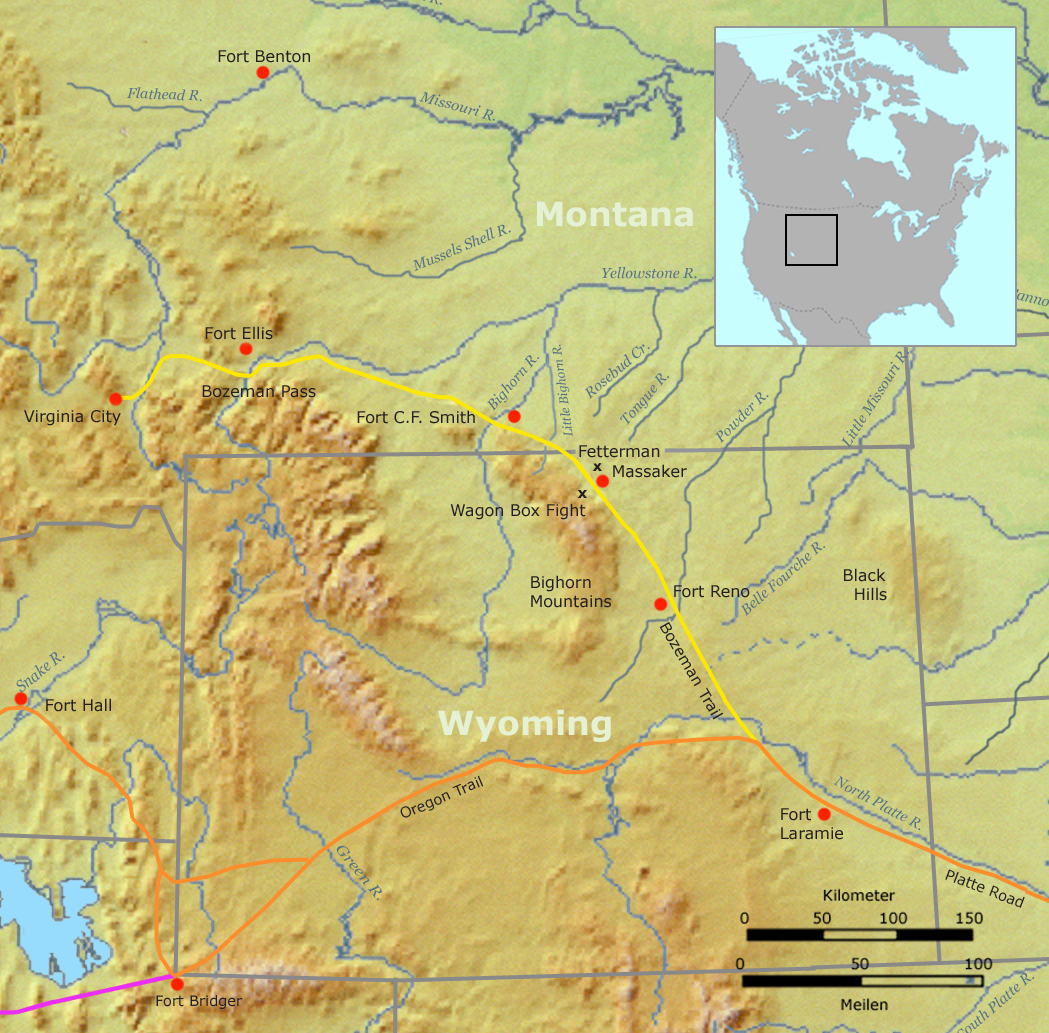
The establishment of three U.S. army forts along the Bozeman trail through Lakota annexed Crow Indian treaty territory caused Red Cloud's war. The Crows fought back against the Indian trespassers by helping the troops in the very same forts that Red Cloud wanted closed. Legend: Bozeman Trail Oregon Trail U.S. Army forts

The numbers of Northern Arapaho diminished, but there were three main bands, Black Bear's band was located in the Powder River Basin. They ranged between the Black Hills in the east to the Bighorns, and to the North Platte basin. Wyoming and Montana still had sufficient buffalo to support the tribe. His band intermarried with Lakota people. Another band, located in Cache la Poudre River area (now Fort Collins, Colorado), was led by a man named Friday. A group on the Sweetwater and North Platte River area was led by Medicine Man. As the military created more forts, the Cheyenne and Arapaho sought to remove European-Americans from the land given to them in the 1851 treaty. The Cheyenne moved back to their pre-1851 hunting grounds to the north and east of the Bighorn Mountains, which pushed the Crows west of the Bighorns.

In April 1865, Black Bear and 400 members of his band were assigned land along the Tongue River in the Powder River Basin as their hunting grounds, in exchange for a pledge of peace. Medicine Man's and Black Bear's bands left their encampment near Fort Collins, Colorado, for the Tongue River area. They allied themselves with Friday and Wolf Moccasin's bands, who had been in the Tongue River area since July 1864. Black Bear and Medicine Man arrived there by June 1865. They decided to forgo any rations that would be provided by the government to follow their traditional way of life, which relied on hunting buffalo for food. Following the lead of Cheyenne and Sioux natives, Black Bear and Medicine Man led their bands against Overland and Oregon Trail travelers beginning in June. They returned to the Tongue River area in August, by which time they were blamed for "most of the outrages committed on the overland mail route west of Denver." Black Bear then left the women and children of his band there while he and some warriors went to fight the Crows on the Bighorn River.

== Battle of Tongue River ==
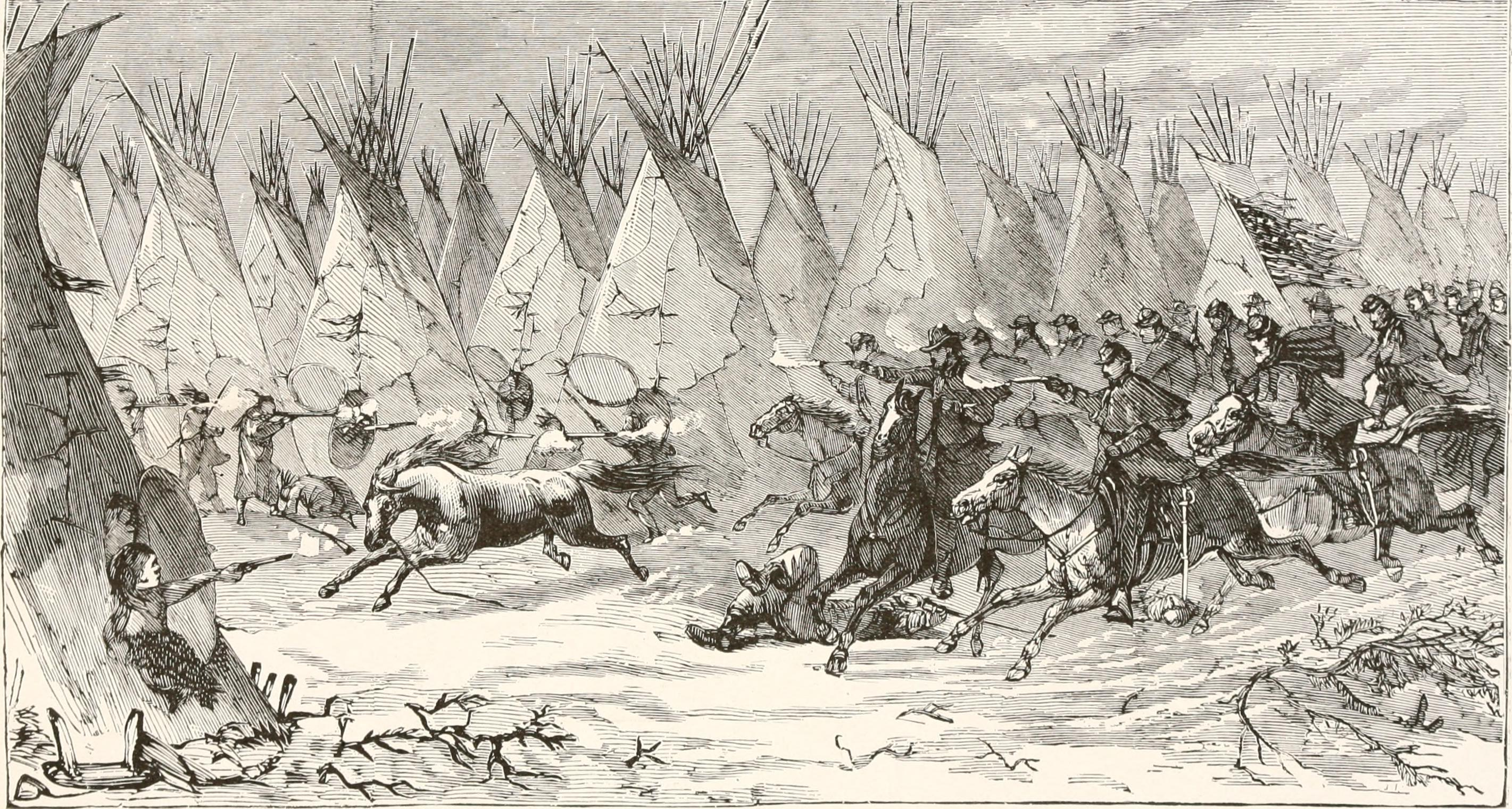
United States Cavalry attacking a Native American village

In the early morning of August 29, 1865, at present-day Ranchester, Wyoming, 125 cavalry and 90 Pawnee Scouts, led by General Patrick Edward Connor, attacked an Arapaho village. The village of Chief Black Bear and Old David's band was located in northeastern Wyoming along the Tongue River. Connor was sent into the Powder River area to fight against local Native Americans to prevent westward miners and settlers from being attacked along the Bozeman and other trails. It was part of the Powder River Expedition to disable Plains Indians. Connor’s objective was to "attack and kill every male Indian over twelve years of age."

The offensive, called the Battle of the Tongue River, involved shotguns, bow and arrows, and hand-to-hand combat — and the United States Army used howitzers, which was devastating to the band of 500 or 700 people. Woman and children ran for safety, and were chased for ten miles by soldiers on horseback. Black Bear's band regrouped. They launched a counter-attack that sent Connor and the troops back to Fort Connor (later Fort Reno), or to an artillery position near the Arapaho village. From a hilltop, the Arapaho watched as their village was burned to the ground. There were 180 or 250 lodges that were destroyed. Their belongings and stores of food saved up for the winter were ruined. Dead band members were burnt with the village. The soldiers drove off about 1,000 horses.

Unfortunately for the women and children, our men had no time to direct their aim; bullets from both sides and murderous arrows filled the air; squaws and children, as well as warriors, fell among the dead and wounded.

— Captain Parker

The attack resulted in the death of men, woman and children, some of those who survived were captured. Black Bear's son was one of the casualties. Losing resources and lives, the Arapaho needed to cooperate with other tribes for shelter, food, and their safety. They were also at risk due to cholera and smallpox that was running through their band at that time.

== Bozeman Trail war of 1866–1868 ==
The Northern Arapaho joined forces with the Cheyenne and Sioux people and fought together in December 1866 against Sawyers' Expedition and in other battles over the next ten years. (Note: According to the diary of Captain H.E. Palmer, Chief Black Bear's band were non-belligerent until the 1865 attack.) He partnered with Red Cloud and Sioux warriors and led his band through conflicts along Bozeman Trail, known as Red Cloud's War, between 1866 and 1868.

With Medicine Man and other Arapaho leaders, Black Bear met with Peace Commissioners in 1868. They sought to live a more peaceful existence on a reservation of their own in Wyoming.

== Fort Laramie Treaty of 1868 ==
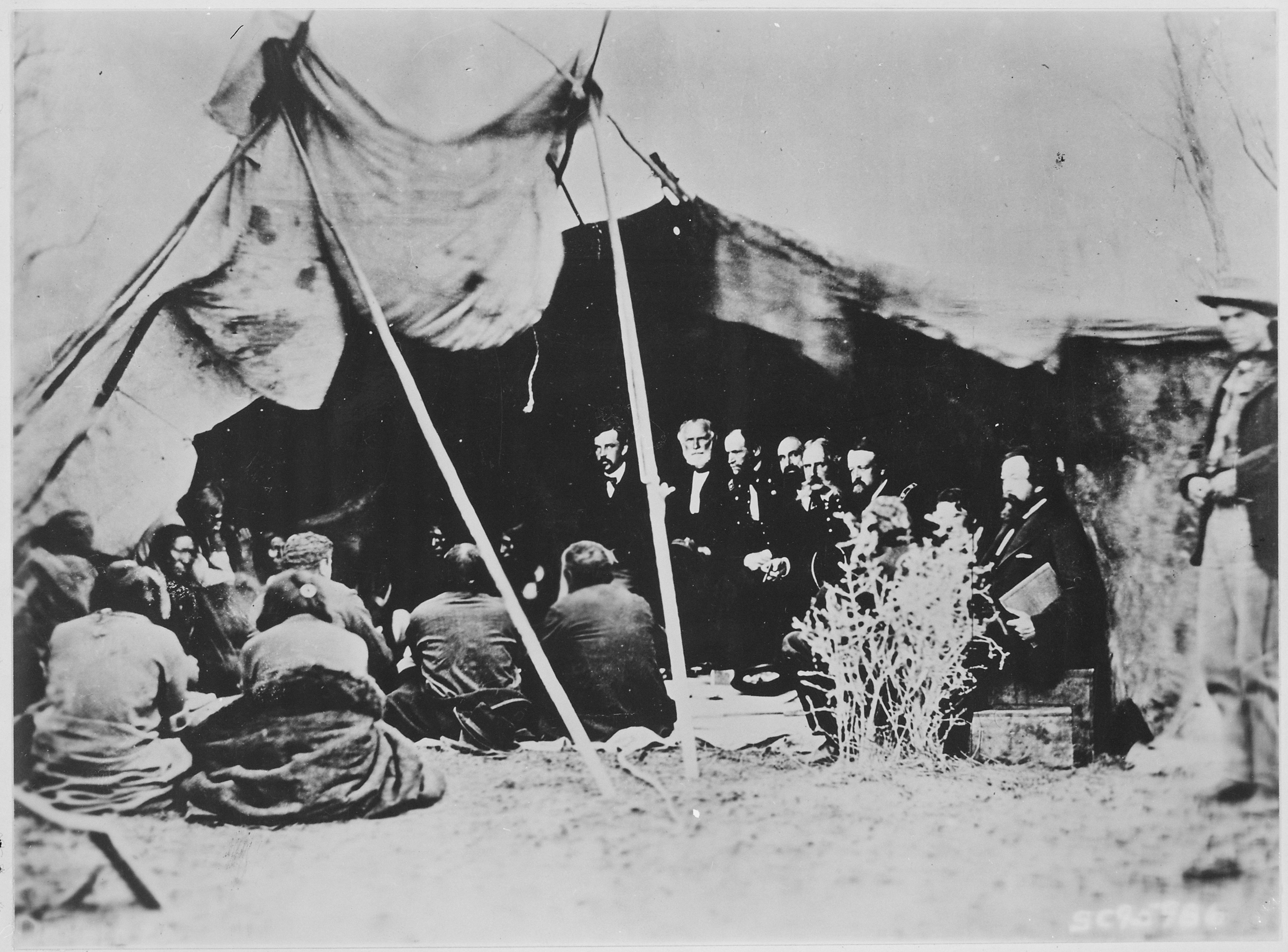
Photograph of General William T. Sherman and Commissioners in Council with Native American Chiefs at Fort Laramie, Wyoming

Black Bear was one of the signers of the Treaty of Fort Laramie of 1868, which allowed the Arapaho to continue to hunt in the Powder River Basin. There was no reservation established for the Northern Arapaho. They had options to live at one of three reservations—one in Indian Territory (now Oklahoma with southern Arapaho and Cheyenne relatives, another with the Crows in Montana Territory, or on the Missouri River with the Lakotas. If they stayed on a reservation, they were to have farm equipment, schools, and rations for 30 years.

Black Bear and Medicine Man continued to look for a solution for a reservation for the Northern Arapaho, such as a former Army post along the North Platter River in Wyoming Territory. At the government's suggestion, Northern Arapaho people lived in 160 lodges with the Gros Ventre in northern Montana Territory during the winter of 1868 to 1869. They left in the spring due to an outbreak of smallpox.

== Later years ==
Black Bear and Medicine Man tried to create better relations with the United States Army. By 1868, some men from their bands became scouts. The Northern Arapaho leaders also sought better relations with the Shoshone, who had been their enemies. Many Arapaho people lived on the Shoshone reservation in Wyoming on a temporary basis. The Shoshone reservation kept Black Bear and Medicine Man's bands in Wyoming. They wanted to reside in Wyoming, but it was a difficult proposition to live among the Shoshone.

The Northern Arapaho bands had an increasingly harder time hunting for sufficient game to feed its people and they began to rely on government rations. Miners and settlers crossed into Native American lands along the Sweetwater and Popo Agie Rivers. This led to periodic skirmishes. In February 1870, Black Bear and Medicine Man were given the permission to stay on Shoshone land, but the agreement was short lived, partly because the Shoshone had regrouped with the Crows, who were enemies of the Cheyenne, Sioux, and Arapaho.

=== Black Bear Battle ===
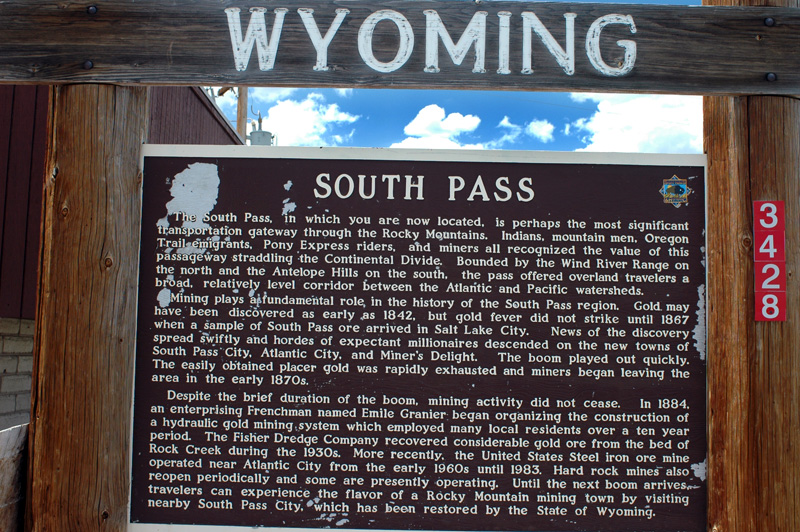
South Pass, Wyoming

Northern Arapaho arrived at the Wind River Indian Reservation in March 1870. Seven miners were killed during an attack on March 31, 1870, which white settlers blamed on the Arapaho, Cheyenne, and Sioux. A voluntary group of soldiers left South Pass, Wyoming, in search of the Native Americans who participated in the attack.

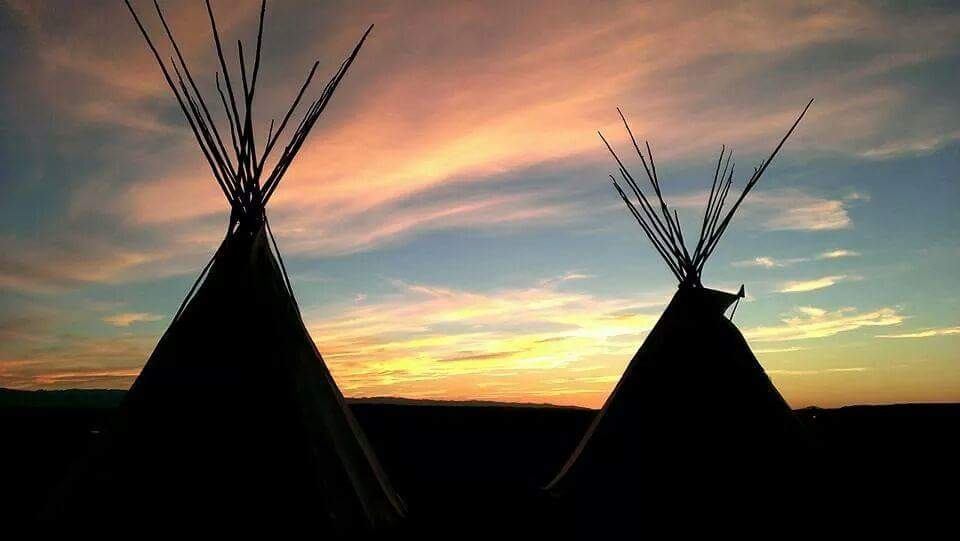
Sunset with tepees on the Wind River Indian Reservation

The Arapaho had a camp in the Wind River Valley. A group of white people, along with Shoshone and Bannocks, attacked Black Bear, his family, and his unarmed band as they traveled to Camp Brown (Fort Washakie) for trading. The attack was called the Black Bear Battle. Black Bear and up to 16 others were killed. His wife and child and an additional seven children were captured. (Note: It is also said that the attack by white vigilantes occurred on March 31, resulting in the death of about 12 members of the band, including Black Bear.) One of the children was Destchewa ("Runs on top of ice") who was adopted by Captain Charles A. Coolidge and his wife. He was renamed Sherman Coolidge.

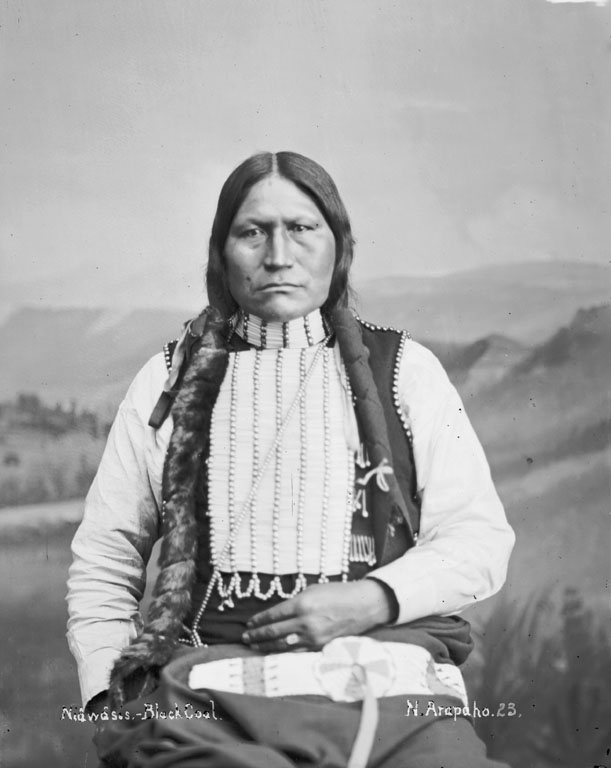
Chief Black Coal, among the most influential Arapaho chiefs of his time. Chief Black Coal was able to largely keep the Arapaho at peace with the United States during the Great Sioux War of 1876. He served as a U.S. Army scout and helped the tribe find a home on Wind River.

After Black Bear's death, the band split up. Some went to Colorado Territory, led by Chief Friday, and others went to the Milk River Agency to live among their relatives, the Gros Ventres. Most of them gathered at Fort Fetterman by August 1870. Medicine Man died in 1871. Chief Black Coal began the leader of the Northern Arapaho.

== Sources ==
- Duncombe, Edward S. (1997). "The Northern Arapahoe Experience of Episcopal Mission Work and United States Policy, 1883–1925 Part I: Background". Anglican and Episcopal History. 66 (2): 175–198. ISSN 0896-8039. JSTOR 42611855.
- Stamm, Henry Edwin (1999). People of the Wind River: The Eastern Shoshones, 1825–1900. University of Oklahoma Press. ISBN 978-0-8061-3175-7.
