= Powder River Country =

Region of the U.S. state of Wyoming

Coordinates: 44°30′N 105°30′W

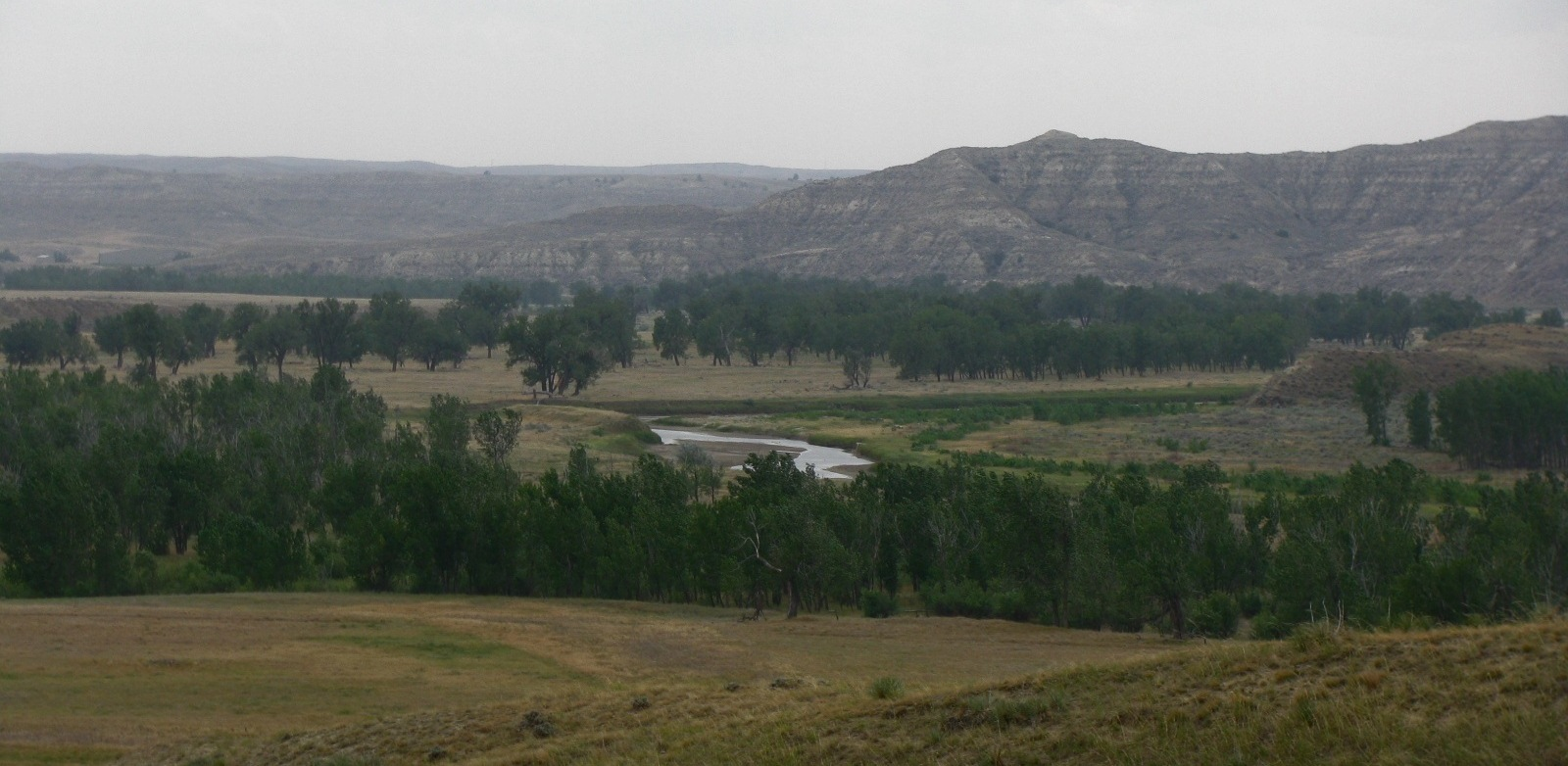
A view of the Powder River in northern Wyoming

The Powder River Country is the Powder River Basin area of the Great Plains in northeastern Wyoming, United States. The area is loosely defined as that between the Bighorn Mountains and the Black Hills, in the upper drainage areas of the Powder, Tongue, and Little Bighorn rivers.

During the late 1860s, the area was the scene of Red Cloud's War, fought between the Lakota peoples and the United States. The Lakota victory in the war resulted in the continuation of their control of the area for the next decade.

After control of the area fell to the U.S. government in the 1870s following the end of the Great Sioux War of 1876–77, the area was opened to white settlement for homesteading. From 1889 to 1893, the area was the scene of the Johnson County War.

In the early 20th century, the discovery of oil in the area led to the development of the area's oil fields. Coal is also mined. In 2019, 43% of the nation's coal was mined in the Power River basin.
