= 2nd Arkansas Infantry Regiment =

2nd Arkansas Infantry Regiment may refer to:

- 2nd Arkansas Infantry Regiment (Confederate)
- 2nd Arkansas Infantry Regiment (Union)
- 2nd Arkansas Colored Infantry Regiment, a Union regiment
- 2nd Arkansas Consolidated Infantry Regiment, a Confederate regiment

== See also ==
- 2nd Arkansas Cavalry Regiment (disambiguation)
- 2nd Arkansas Light Artillery
- 2nd Arkansas Field Battery
