= 4th Arkansas Cavalry Regiment =

4th Arkansas Cavalry Regiment may refer to:

- 4th Arkansas Cavalry Regiment (Confederate)
- 4th Arkansas Cavalry Regiment (Union)

== See also ==
- 4th Arkansas Infantry Regiment (disambiguation)
- 4th Arkansas Field Battery
