= List of Union units from Arkansas in the American Civil War =

The United States with 35 stars.

Like almost all Southern states during the American Civil War, Arkansas provided a number of units to fight for the Union, organized from African-Americans and pro-Union sympathizers. Arkansas had the third smallest white population out of the Confederate states, but more whites joined the Union Army from that state than any other besides Tennessee. In addition, 5,526 African-Americans served in Union units raised in Arkansas. The list of Confederate units is shown separately.

ARKANSAS	NOTES
1st Arkansas Cavalry Regiment (Union)	
2nd Arkansas Cavalry Regiment (Union)	
3rd Arkansas Cavalry Regiment (Union)	
4th Arkansas Cavalry Regiment (Union)	
1st Arkansas Light Artillery Battery (Union)	
1st Arkansas Light Artillery Battery (Colored)	Also known as Battery "H" of the 2nd U.S. Light Artillery Regiment.
1st Arkansas Infantry Battalion (Union)	
1st Arkansas Infantry Regiment (Union)	
1st Arkansas Infantry Regiment (Colored)	Also known as the 46th U.S. Infantry Regiment (Colored).
2nd Arkansas Infantry Regiment (Union)	
2nd Arkansas Infantry Regiment (Colored)	Also known as the 54th U.S. Infantry Regiment (Colored).
3rd Arkansas Infantry Regiment (Union)	Failed to complete organization.
3rd Arkansas Infantry Regiment (Colored)	Also known as the 56th U.S. Infantry Regiment (Colored).
4th Arkansas Infantry Regiment (Union)	Failed to complete organization. Transferred to the 2nd Arkansas Infantry Rgt.
4th Arkansas Infantry Regiment (Colored)	Also known as the 57th U.S. Infantry Regiment (Colored).
5th Arkansas Infantry Regiment (Colored)	Also known as the 112th U.S. Infantry Regiment (Colored).
6th Arkansas Infantry Regiment (Colored)	Also known as the 113th U.S. Infantry Regiment (Colored).
11th United States Colored Infantry Regiment (Old)

== See also ==
- Lists of American Civil War Regiments by State
- Arkansas Civil War Confederate Units
- Southern Unionists
- United States Colored Troops

== Bibliography ==
- Dyer, Frederick H. (1959). A Compendium of the War of the Rebellion. New York and London. Thomas Yoseloff, Publisher. LCCN 59-12963.
- Atkinson, J. H., ed. (1862). Clayton and Catterson Rob Columbia County. Arkansas Historical Quarterly 21 (Summer 1962): 153–158.
- Barnes, Kenneth C. (1998). Who Killed John Clayton? Political Violence and the Emergence of the New South, 1861–1893. Durham, NC: Duke University Press.
- Bears, Edwin C. (1990). Steele’s Retreat from Camden and the Battle of Jenkin’s Ferry. Little Rock: Eagle Press.
- Brothers in Arms: Civil War Exhibition. Old State House Museum Online Collections. Brothers in Arms Collection (accessed May 18, 2011).
- Buxton, Virginia. Clayton's Militia in Sevier and Howard Counties. Arkansas Historical Quarterly 20 (Winter 1961): 344–350.
- Christ, Mark K. Civil War Arkansas, 1863: The Battle for a State. Norman: University of Oklahoma Press, 2010.
- Clayton, Powell. The Aftermath of the Civil War in Arkansas. New York: Negro University Press, 1969.
- Dougan, Michael B. Confederate Arkansas: The People and Politics of a Frontier State in Wartime. Tuscaloosa: University of Alabama Press, 1976.
- Finley, Randy. From Slavery to Uncertain Freedom: The Freedmen's Bureau in Arkansas, 1865–1869. Fayetteville: University of Arkansas Press, 1996.
- Pearce, Larry Wesley. The American Missionary Association and the Freedmen in Arkansas, 1863–1878. Arkansas Historical Quarterly 30 (Summer 1971): 123–144.
- Pearce, Larry Wesley. The American Missionary Association and the Freedmen's Bureau in Arkansas, 1866–1868. Arkansas Historical Quarterly 30 (Autumn 1971): 242–259.
- Pearce, Larry Wesley. The American Missionary Association and the Freedmen's Bureau in Arkansas, 1868-1878. Arkansas Historical Quarterly 31 (Autumn 1972): 246–261.
- Richards, Ira D. The Battle of Poison Spring. Arkansas Historical Quarterly 18 (Winter 1959): 338–349.
- Unknown. The Camden Expedition, March 23–May 3, 1864. MA thesis, University of Arkansas, 1958.
- Singletary, Otis. Negro Militia and Reconstruction. Austin: University of Texas Press, 1957.
- Staples, Thomas. Reconstruction in Arkansas, 1862–1874. New York: Columbia University Press, 1923.
- Steele, Phillip, and Steve Cottrell. Civil War in the Ozarks. Gretna, LA: Pelican Press, 1993.
- Stith, Matthew W. Social War: People, Nature, and Irregular Warfare on the Trans-Mississippi Frontier, 1861–1865. PhD diss., University of Arkansas, 2010.
- Taylor, Orville. Negro Slavery in Arkansas. Fayetteville: University of Arkansas Press, 2000.
- Thompson, George H. Arkansas and Reconstruction: The Influence of Geography, Economics, and Personality. Port Washington, NY: Kennikat Press, 1976.
- Trelease, Allen W. White Terror: The Ku Klux Klan Conspiracy and Southern Reconstruction. Baton Rouge: Louisiana State University Press, 1971.
- Worley, Ted R. The Arkansas Peace Society of 1861: A Study in Mountain Unionism. The Journal of Southern History 24 (November 1958): 445–456.
