= 4th Arkansas Infantry Regiment =

4th Arkansas Infantry Regiment may refer to:

- 4th Arkansas Infantry Regiment (Confederate)
- 4th Arkansas Infantry Regiment (Union)
- 4th Arkansas Colored Infantry Regiment

== See also ==
- 4th Arkansas Infantry Battalion, a Confederate unit
- 4th Arkansas Cavalry Regiment (disambiguation)
- 4th Arkansas Field Battery, a Confederate unit
