= Terrett Butte =

Mountain in Montana, United States

- Turret Buttes, Twin Buttes
- Terrett Butte, 2006

Highest point
- Elevation: 3,530 ft (1,080 m)
- Coordinates: 45°14′53″N 105°37′21″W

Geography
- Location within Montana
- Location: Powder River County, Montana, United States

Terrett Butte, also called the Turret Buttes, are a prominent landmark on the east side of the Powder River in south-central Powder River County, Montana. They are better known today as the Turret Buttes because of their resemblance to a castle or gun turret.

== History ==
The first time the buttes were mentioned in writing was on September 12, 1865, in the diary of Major Lyman G. Bennett, the chief engineering officer accompanying Colonel Nelson D. Cole's column of the Powder River Expedition. Bennett wrote:

Marched on west side of Powder River, crossing in the morning. The road was generally good, being on second bottom with high rocky mountains on either side the valley, the tops of many being covered with pine. The scenery was truly romantic. The mountains being high and worn into many fantastic shapes, such as ruins, castles, etc.

— Major Lyman G. Bennett, September 12, 1865

The buttes appear on maps from the 1880s and were likely named after a homesteading family whose last name was Terret or Terrett. From around 1915 until the 1940s a rural country schoolhouse called the Terret Butte School was situated along the east side of the Powder River below the buttes. During the mid-20th century, the buttes were located on the Swope Family Ranch. Between the early 1980s and 2005, the buttes were owned by Andrew L. Lewis Jr., the 7th United States Secretary of Transportation.

Terrett Butte at sunrise

== Location ==
Terrett Butte is located on private land, about two hundred yards east of Powder River East Road South, about 17 miles (27 km) southwest of present-day Broadus, Montana, in south-central Powder River County, Montana.
