= 11th United States Colored Infantry Regiment (Old) =

11th U.S. Colored Infantry
- Country: United States
- Allegiance: Union
- Branch: Infantry
- Size: Regiment
- Engagements: American Civil War

The 11th United States Colored Infantry was an infantry regiment that served in the Union Army during the American Civil War. The regiment was composed of African American enlisted men commanded by white officers and was authorized by the Bureau of Colored Troops which was created by the United States War Department on May 22, 1863.

== Organization ==
The 11th Regiment, United States Colored Troops was recruited out of Fort Smith in the fall and winter of 1863–64, shortly after the Union had recaptured the post from Confederate forces. The unit was recruited from former slaves from Ft. Smith, Van Buren, Dripping Springs, Kibler, Alma and other local communities. In addition, several men who had been enslaved in nearby Choctaw Nation, heard about the opportunity to join and slipped into Arkansas and joined the 11th US Colored Infantry. Companies A, B, C and D were mustered into the service of the Union army on December 19, 1863, at Fort Smith, with Company E to follow on March 3, 1864.

== Service ==
The 11th United States Colored Infantry was attached to the 2nd Brigade, District of the Frontier, 7th Corps, Dept. of Arkansas, until January, 1865 and then attached to the Colored Brigade, 7th Corps, to February, 1865. 2nd Brigade, 1st Division, 7th Corps, to April, 1865. The unit was first assigned to post and garrison duty at Fort Smith. They spent most of their time drilling and performing routine duties such as working on the earthwork fortifications that surrounded the town of Fort Smith, serving as guards, and participating in any formal dress parades.

It was in the summer of 1864 that the unit saw its first real military action. In mid-July of that year, the five companies of the 11th USCT, numbering 265 effective men, moved into Indian Territory. Their assignment was to guard government stock and a haying party operating at Gunther's Prairie, 12 miles northwest of Fort Smith. At daybreak on August 24, an estimated 300 to 400 Confederate cavalry, both white and Indian, attacked this force. The fighting lasted until 7:30 that morning and some firing continued as late as 10 a.m. According to military records, for one hour the contest was close and the fire almost incessant. The Confederates made three separate charges and were repulsed each time and finally were compelled to retreat. The loss to the force is unknown but the 11th USCT had 3 men killed and 14 missing or wounded.

The unit remained at the Ft. Smith post until November 1864 when they were moved eastward to Lewisburg, in Conway County, Arkansas. The 11th saw action again at Boggs's Mill on January 24, 1865. On the night of the January 24, a detachment of Colonel Robert C. Newton’s 10th Arkansas Confederate Cavalry Regiment seized the mill, located twelve miles from Dardanelle in Yell County, in order to grind flour. Lieutenant Colonel James M. Steele, leading the 11th USCT, surprised the Confederate force, capturing eighteen horses and twenty stands of arms, as well as all of the flour and Newton’s papers. The regiment then returned to garrison duty at both Little Rock and Lewisburg until April, 1865.

== Mustered out of service ==
In late April 1865, after the surrender of Lee's army in Virginia, the unit was officially consolidated with the 112th and the 113th United States Colored Infantry to form the new 113th U.S. Colored Troops on April 22, 1865. They were mustered out a year later, on April 9, 1866.

== See also ==
- List of United States Colored Troops Civil War Units
- United States Colored Troops
- Lists of American Civil War Regiments by State
- Arkansas in the American Civil War

== Bibliography ==
- Desmond Walls Allen, ARKANSAS DAMNED YANKEES: An Index to Union Soldiers in Arkansas Regiments, Arkansas Research, Inc. ISBN 0-941765-12-1.
- Burkhart, George S. Confederate Rage, Yankee Wrath: No Quarter in the Civil War. Carbondale: Southern Illinois University Press, 2007.
- Christ, Mark K., ed. “All Cut to Pieces and Gone to Hell”: The Civil War, Race Relations, and the Battle of Poison Spring. Little Rock: August House, 2003.
- Glatthaar, Joseph T. Forged in Battle: The Civil War Alliance of Black Soldiers and White Officers. New York: Free Press, 1990.
- Hargrove, Hondon B. Black Union Soldiers in the Civil War. Jefferson, NC: McFarland & Company, 2003.
- Lause, Mark A. Race and Radicalism in the Union Army. Urbana: University of Illinois Press, 2009.
- Nichols, Ronnie A. “Emancipation of Black Union Soldiers in Little Rock, 1863–1865.” Pulaski County Historical Review 61 (Fall 2013): 76–85.
- Robertson, Brian K. “‘Will They Fight? Ask the Enemy’: United States Colored Troops at Big Creek, Arkansas, July 26, 1864.” Arkansas Historical Quarterly 66 (Autumn 2007): 320–332.
- Trudeau, Noah Andre. Like Men of War: Black Troops in the Civil War 1862–1865. Boston: Back Bay Books, 1999.
- Urwin, Gregory J. W. Black Flag over Dixie: Racial Atrocities and Reprisals in the Civil War. Carbondale: Southern Illinois University Press, 2005.
- 11th. United States Colored Infantry Materials. Butler Center for Arkansas Studies. Central Arkansas Library System, Little Rock, Arkansas. Finding aid online at http://arstudies.contentdm.oclc.org/cdm/compoundobject/collection/findingaids/id/4840/rec/1 (accessed October 25, 2013).
