= 1st Arkansas Infantry Battalion =

1st Battalion, Arkansas Volunteer Infantry
- National Color of the 1st Arkansas Infantry Battalion
- Active: July 21, 1862, to December 31, 1862
- Disbanded: December 31, 1862
- Country: United States
- Allegiance: Union
- Branch: United States Army Volunteers
- Type: Infantry
- Size: Battalion
- Garrison/HQ: Helena, Benton Barracks
- Engagements: American Civil War

Commanders
- Lt. Col.: John C. Bundy

The 1st Battalion Arkansas Volunteer Infantry (1862) was an infantry battalion that served in the Union Army during the American Civil War. Although Arkansas joined the Confederate States of America in 1861, not all of its citizens supported secession.

== History ==
=== Formation ===
In February 1862 the Union army, under the command Major General Samuel Curtis, entered northwest Arkansas in pursuit of the Confederate forces. The two sides met in force on March 5 at Pea Ridge where the Union successfully defeated the Confederates and forced them south. Following this victory, Curtis moved his army east with the goal to capture Memphis. Along the way, he briefly stopped at Batesville in Independence County, about 95 miles northeast of Little Rock. While stationed there, an Arkansas Unionist named H.V. Gray, later Captain, and perhaps as many as 140 others had approached the newly arrived Federal army with the intent to be mustered into service for 6 months. These men had banded together to resist the rebels and some, including Gray, had their lives threatened. Later a group of around 30 men from Conway County would also arrive. Curtis was reportedly sympathetic to them but he himself had no authority to raise such a unit at the time. Frustrated by this, some men returned to their homes. In June the War department would give permission for Pleasant Turney and L. D.Toney, both of independence and Izard county respectively, to recruit from the surrounding areas.

In the meantime the men who had enlisted stayed at their homes until they presumed they would be called for mustering. This never came and they were shocked to learn that the army would be leaving Batesville and heading to Helena, as Curtis had since changed his plans and abandoned the Tennessee capital as it had already fallen. The recruits were not informed of this until the army began moving and this forced them to leave with only what they had on their person. They were under the impression that Curtis and his army would stay in northern Arkansas of which they could provide protection to the Unionists' families and property. Curtis’s departure was so quick the men didn’t even have time to see their families.

Nonetheless, the men stayed together and marched with the army 136 miles to Helena where they arrived on July 12. On July 21 they were mustered into a battalion of Infantry with their enlistments set for 6 months. The battalion was made up of 4 companies and the men elected to have a fellow Arkansan lead them. This was rejected by General Curtis who instead put a northerner named John C. Bundy in command with the rank of lieutenant colonel. This greatly angered the men and further soured the relationship between the army and the new volunteers.

=== Service ===
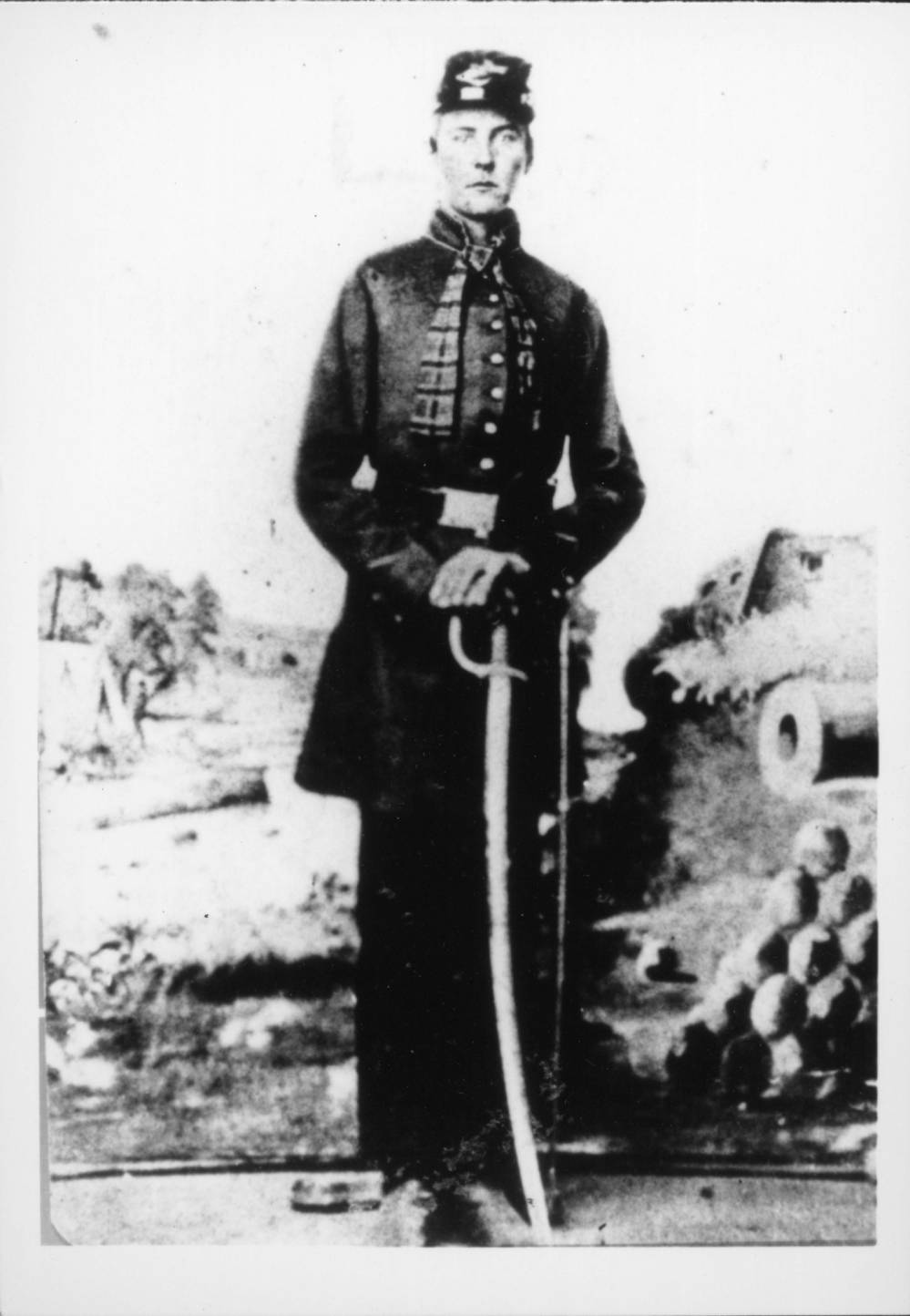
Pvt. Thomas J. Jefferson of Company C. This photograph was likely taken while the battalion was stationed at the Benton Barracks.

According to a dispatch from the New York Daily Tribute, the 1st Arkansas Infantry Battalion was “nearly full, fitted, and drilled, ready for the field” as of July 31. They also reported that “Hundreds of citizens are still flying from conscription to the interior of the lines.”

While the battalion was quickly supplied they were disappointed that they would simply serve as standard infantry. Allegedly General Curtis had told them they would eventually become a mounted unit, a statement which quickly proved untrue when the men learned that their horses, which many brought to keep out of the hands of confederates, would not be allowed to eat from the armies Quartermaster department. As a result, some of the horses died while the rest were either sold or stolen.

Throughout their service morale was consistently low in the battalion as they were over a hundred miles from their families and had little they could do to relieve them from confederate harassment. The battalion would spend the remainder of July, August, September, and most of October at Helena, during which they participated in the occasional drill but were mostly static. Death was also rampant throughout the summer as Helena became swamped with disease due to poor sanitation. All the while the battalion was repeatedly frustrated with the army's lack of action in Arkansas.

The friction between the two sides came to a head when the army paymaster refused to pay the soldiers of the battalion, saying that Curtis lacked the authority to raise such a unit, to begin with. Eventually, the military governor, John S. Phelps, had to intervene and men eventually received their pay.

On October 20 the battalion was ordered to Sulphur Springs, Missouri. However, due to the number of sick men the destination was changed to the Benton Barracks in St. Louis. They arrived at the barracks on October 28, traveling by riverboat. They remained in St. Louis until being mustered out of service on December 31, 1862.

== See also ==
- List of Arkansas Civil War Union units
- List of United States Colored Troops Civil War Units
- Arkansas in the American Civil War

== Bibliography ==
- Dyer, Frederick H. (1959). A Compendium of the War of the Rebellion. New York and London. Thomas Yoseloff, Publisher. LCCN 59-12963.
- Bishop, Albert W. (1867). Report of the Adjutant General of Arkansas, for the Period of the Late Rebellion, and to November 1, 1866., (Washington : Govt. print. off., 1867).
