= Nicholas Greusel =

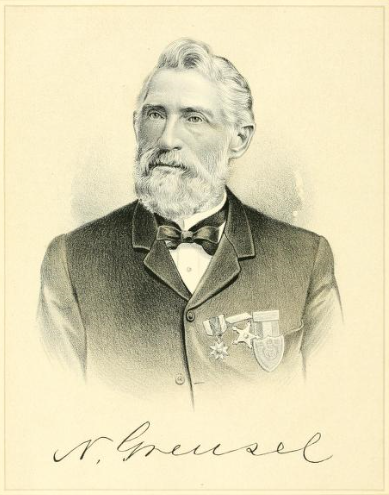
- Born: July 4, 1817; Blieskastel, Kingdom of Bavaria
- Died: April 25, 1896 (aged 78); Aurora, Illinois
- Burial place: Aurora, Illinois
- Military career
- Allegiance: (United States) Union; Illinois
- Branch: Union Army
- Service years: 1861–1863
- Rank: Colonel
- Commands: 36th Illinois Infantry Regiment; 1st Bde, 1st Div, Army of the Southwest; 1st Bde, 5th Div, Army of the Mississippi; 37th Bde, 11th Div, Army of the Ohio; 1st Bde, 3rd Div, Right Wing, Army of the Cumberland
- Conflicts: Mexican–American War; American Civil War; Battle of Pea Ridge (1862); Siege of Corinth (1862); Battle of Perryville (1862); Battle of Stones River (1862–63)
- Other work: Detroit Alderman (1844–46)

Nicholas Greusel (July 4, 1817 – April 25, 1896) commanded the 36th Illinois Infantry Regiment during the early part of the American Civil War. As a teenager, he emigrated from the Kingdom of Bavaria to the United States. Later moving to Detroit, he was elected to political office for two years. He led a Michigan volunteer company during the Mexican-American War and later moved to Illinois. At the start of the Civil War he joined a three-month Illinois regiment, rising to field officer rank before the state governor appointed him colonel of the 36th Illinois. He led a brigade at the battles of Pea Ridge and Perryville and at the Siege of Corinth. At the Battle of Stones River he assumed command of the brigade when its commander was killed. He resigned because of poor health soon after Stones River and worked for the Chicago, Burlington and Quincy Railroad. He espoused pacifism in his later years.

== Early career ==
Nicholas Greusel was born on July 4, 1817, in Blieskastel which then belonged to the Kingdom of Bavaria. He received an education in the German and French languages. In 1833, his parents and siblings emigrated to New York City in the United States. His father told the eight older children, including Nicholas that they were on their own. Nicholas found employment for a year with the mother of Hamilton Fish, and for a second year worked in a brickyard. His entire family moved again, arriving in Detroit, Michigan Territory on November 1, 1836. Greusel got a job in the lumbering business which he kept for the next decade. During this time he became captain of a militia company and later major in the Frontier Guards. Greusel married Jane Doumens in 1839; they would have 12 children of whom eight were living in 1888. In 1844, he was elected Alderman of the Fourth Ward of Detroit as a member of the Whig Party and served for two years.

When the Mexican-American War broke out, Greusel raised a company of volunteers. He was elected captain of what became Company D of the 1st Michigan Regiment. The company marched to Springfield, Ohio, then went by railroad to Cincinnati, and by boat to New Orleans. The regiment landed in Veracruz ten days after the conclusion of the Siege of Veracruz. The regiment served under James Bankhead's command in the area around Orizaba and Córdoba, skirmishing with guerillas and small groups of Mexican regulars. At the war's end, the regiment went home, arriving in Detroit on July 12, 1847. Of D Company's 105 soldiers who began the war, 85 returned home, which represented fewer losses than suffered by the other companies. By good management of company funds, Greusel saved $300 which he used to buy new shirts and shoes for his soldiers. The regiment's colonel placed sharp-looking Company D in the front of the homecoming parade.

Soon after, Greusel was elected major and then lieutenant colonel of the city guards. In 1849 he was appointed superintendent of the city water works and in 1850–1852 he became Inspector General of lumber for Michigan. At this time, Greusel made a bad investment, which cost him his life savings. He spent the following years working as a conductor for the Michigan Central Railroad. He later moved to Aurora, Illinois, and took a job with the Chicago, Burlington and Quincy Railroad. On April 18, 1861, after the Battle of Fort Sumter, Captain Greusel enrolled the Aurora Company in the Illinois militia for three-months service. The company was absorbed into the 7th Illinois Infantry Regiment on April 25. Greusel rose in rank to become lieutenant colonel of the 7th Illinois. On August 14, Governor Richard Yates appointed Greusel colonel of the "Fox River Regiment". This unit became the 36th Illinois Infantry.

== Civil War ==
=== Pea Ridge–Corinth ===
At the Battle of Pea Ridge on March 7–8, 1862, Greusel commanded the 2nd Brigade in the 1st Division under Peter Joseph Osterhaus. The division formed part of the Army of the Southwest under Samuel Ryan Curtis. The brigade's units were the 36th Illinois, 12th Missouri, and two Illinois cavalry companies under Albert Jenks and Henry A. Smith. By 9:00 am on March 7, Curtis received positive information that Earl Van Dorn's Confederate army made a turning movement and was approaching his army's right rear. He ordered Osterhaus to march to Leetown with some cavalry units and Greusel to follow with his brigade and elements of the 3rd Division. The Federal cavalrymen were quickly routed and stampeded past the marching infantry. Greusel shouted at his men, "Officers and men, you have it in your power to make or prevent another Bull Run affair. I want every man to stand to his post". The soldiers did not panic and Osterhaus arrived to find Greusel calmly directing the deployment of the troops along the southern edge of Oberson's field. The position was manned by Greusel's two regiments plus three M1841 12-pounder howitzers of Martin Welfley's Missouri Battery and the six guns of Louis Hoffman's 4th Ohio Battery. When the 6th Texas Cavalry Regiment suddenly burst into Oberson's field, it was quickly taken under fire and compelled to retreat.

Greusel ordered the gunners to lob howitzer shells over the woods and this blind fire proved surprisingly effective, panicking the Confederates' Indian allies. He also sent a skirmish line composed of Silas Miller's Company B and Irving Parkhurst's Company G of the 36th Illinois to the northern edge of the field. Soon afterward, the skirmishers shot dead the Confederate division commander Benjamin McCulloch as he reconnoitered. When Companies B and G came under attack, Greusel ordered the 36th Illinois forward to rescue them. The regiment fired several volleys that killed James M. McIntosh, the second-in-command. The loss of two leading generals led to a disastrous breakdown in the chain of command and "doomed the Confederate effort at Leetown" that day. On March 8, both armies concentrated their forces near Elkhorn Tavern. That morning Franz Sigel organized a highly effective bombardment by 21 guns on the Union left flank. Confederate return fire only killed a handful of Union soldiers. A cannon ball narrowly missed Greusel's head, knocking him off his horse, but not seriously injuring him. As the Confederate troops wavered, the Federal left flank infantry swept forward to victory with Greusel's two regiments in the front line on the left. The 36th Illinois lost four killed, 37 wounded, and 34 missing while the 12th Missouri lost three killed, 29 wounded, and two missing.

From June 1 to September 4, 1862, Greusel commanded the 1st Brigade in the 5th Division of the Army of the Mississippi. During this period, which included the Siege of Corinth, the 5th Division was led first by Alexander Asboth and later by Gordon Granger.

=== Perryville–Stones River ===
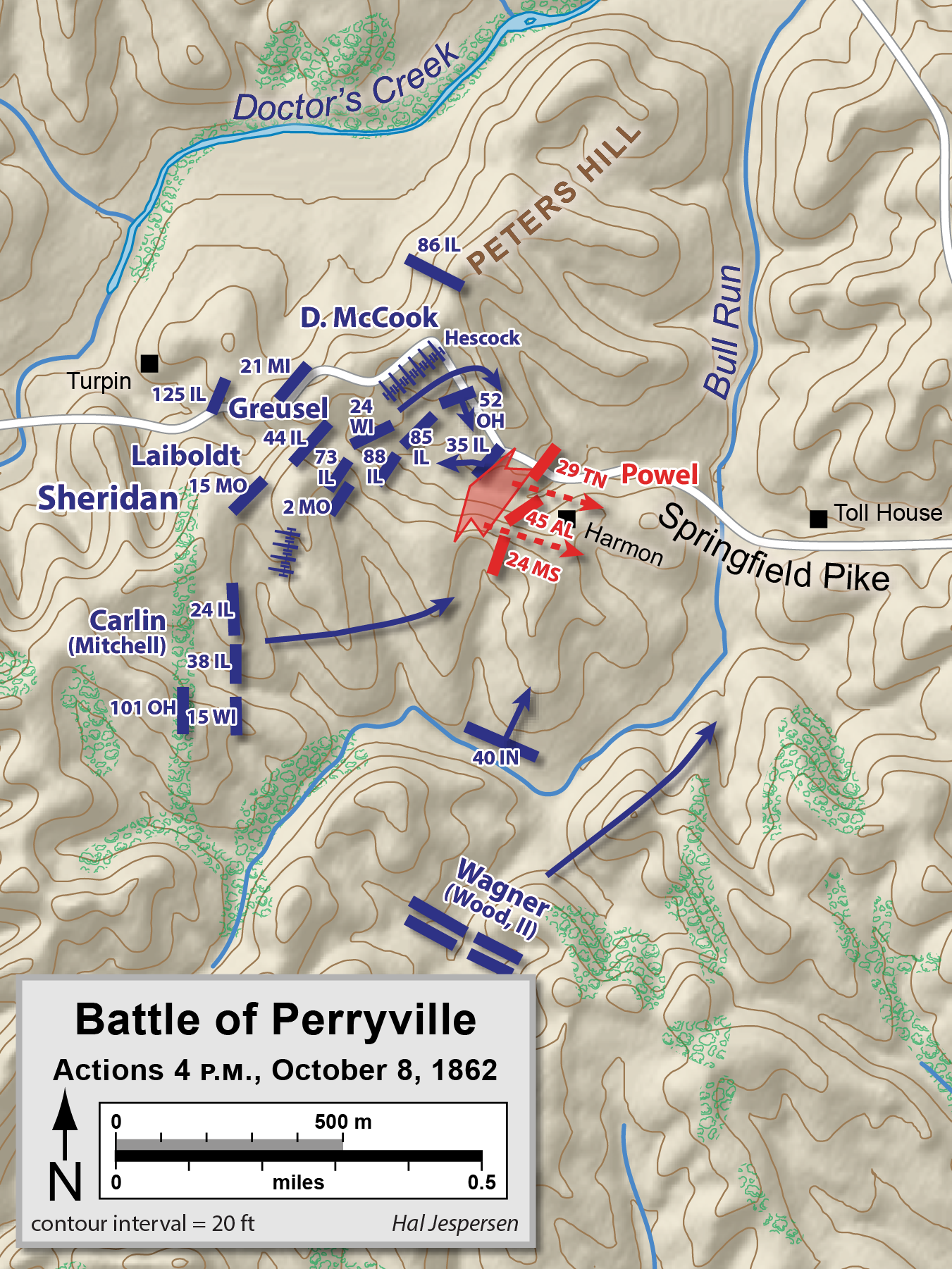
Battle of Perryville, 4 pm: Powel's attack on Sheridan's division. 35 IL should read 36 IL.

At the Battle of Perryville on October 8, 1862, Greusel commanded the 37th Brigade in Philip Sheridan's 11th Division, Charles Champion Gilbert's III Corps, Don Carlos Buell's Army of the Ohio. The brigade included the 36th Illinois, 88th Illinois, 21st Michigan, and 24th Wisconsin Regiments. According to one source, the brigade sustained losses of 15 killed, 124 wounded, and four missing. A second source recorded losses of 12 killed, 61 wounded, and four missing in the 36th Illinois, eight killed and 35 wounded in the 88th Illinois, 22 wounded in the 21st Michigan, and one killed in the 24th Wisconsin. On the late afternoon of October 7, Greusel's brigade was committed to help the Federal cavalrymen, causing the Confederate horsemen under Joseph Wheeler to pull back. At 4:00 pm on October 8, three Confederate regiments launched an ill-considered attack on Sheridan's division perched on Peters Hill. They were stopped cold by the 36th Illinois which rose up suddenly and fired a volley. A firefight ensued at 100 ft (30 m) range across a cornfield with the 88th Illinois on the right of the 36th Illinois and Daniel McCook Jr.'s brigade on its left. Presently, the 36th Illinois ran out of ammunition and withdrew, to be replaced one of McCook's regiments. Meanwhile, Sheridan moved the 24th Wisconsin to the far left and the Confederate line soon collapsed after suffering 200–300 casualties. The 21st Michigan remained in support of Charles M. Barnett's Battery I, 2nd Illinois Light Artillery.

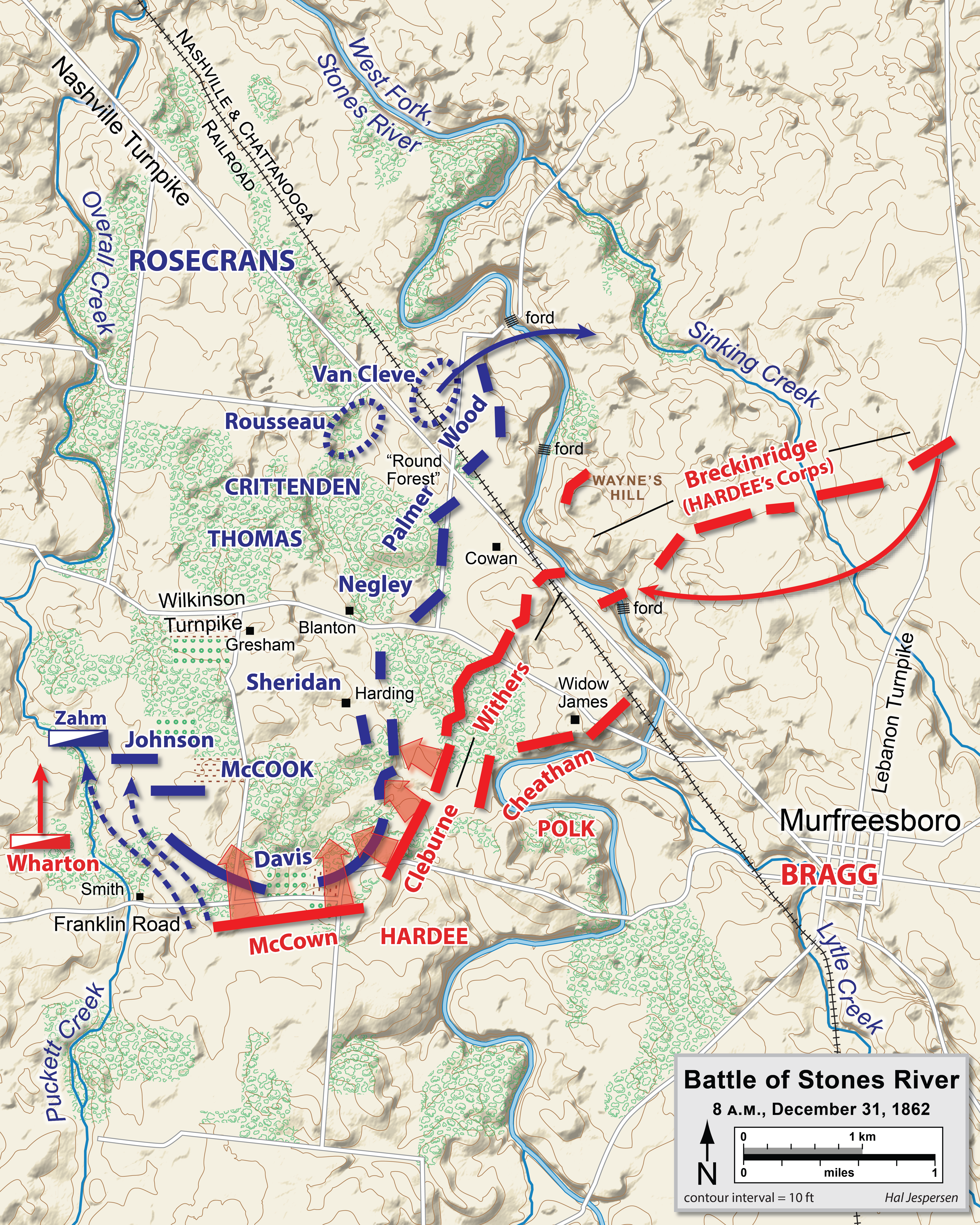
Battle of Stones River, 8 am: McCook's right collapses. Sheridan comes under attack.

At the Battle of Stones River on December 31, 1862 – January 2, 1863, Greusel commanded the 36th Illinois in Joshua W. Sill's 1st Brigade, Sheridan's 3rd Division, Alexander McDowell McCook's Right Wing, William Rosecrans's Army of the Cumberland. The regiments were the same as at Perryville. The brigade suffered losses of 104 killed, 365 wounded, and 200 missing. An hour after the Confederates attacked McCook's right flank on the morning of December 31, five Union brigades were fleeing in confusion or panic. At some time after 7:00 am, the last of Jefferson C. Davis's brigades and Sheridan's division began to come under attack. They were facing east and southeast. The 24th Wisconsin disintegrated at the first blow, leaving a gap on the right of the 36th Illinois. When the 19th Alabama approached within 50 yd (46 m), the Illinoisans blasted them with a volley. For a half hour, the two regiments blazed away at each other before the 19th Alabama began edging backward. Greusel ordered a counterattack with fixed bayonets and routed the Confederates. During the first clash, Sill was shot dead and Greusel assumed leadership of the brigade, with Silas Miller taking command of the 36th Illinois.

For 90 minutes, Sheridan's three brigades fought seven Confederate brigades to a deadlock, in what some would call "the most determined stand of the entire war". At 8:00 am, Davis's last brigade was finally bludgeoned into retreat. Arthur Middleton Manigault's Confederate brigade attacked and was repulsed. Out of ammunition and unable to secure 0.67 caliber cartridges (0.58 caliber was standard issue), the 36th Illinois was given permission to withdraw. It had lost 46 killed, 151 wounded, and 15 missing. Sheridan pulled back to a second position, sending the 88th Illinois and 21st Michigan to hold a position near the Harding farm. At 8:30 am, the brigades of Manigault and George Maney attacked the new position. Taking up a third position, Sheridan swung Greusel's brigade back to the Blanton house where the 24th Wisconsin had rallied. Around 10:00 am, Sheridan was compelled to order a retreat because his soldiers were out of ammunition. By this time, the division was bent into a V with Greusel's brigade facing west. McCook appeared and ordered Greusel to withdraw without consulting Sheridan. This badly-timed command resulted in the Confederate seizure of six guns from Charles Houghtaling's Battery C, 1st Illinois Light Artillery. At 2:00 pm, the 36th Illinois took a position in reserve near the Round Forest.

On January 2, 1863, after several days of fighting and no sleep, Sheridan and Greusel lay down to sleep in a crude brush shelter. Next morning, they woke covered in snow and Greusel could not move. He resigned from the army due to his rheumatism on February 7, 1863. One source stated that Greusel was breveted brigadier general after Stones River by the recommendation of William Rosecrans. After the war was over, on October 15, 1865, Sheridan wrote a highly complimentary letter to Greusel, thanking him for his services. However, in the letter Sheridan referred to his rank as colonel. Greusel was awarded a silver-plated revolver for having the best-drilled regiment in the army.

== Post-war career ==
After leaving the army, Greusel resumed his employment as a conductor with the Chicago, Burlington and Quincy Railroad. On September 1, 1866, he moved to Burlington, Iowa, and took a new job as Roadmaster for the Burlington and Missouri River Railroad. In January 1867, he moved again to Mount Pleasant, Iowa. He worked for the Burlington and Missouri River Railroad for three years then retired. In 1888, he was a vestryman at Saint Michael's Episcopal Church in Mount Pleasant. Greusel and his wife had 12 children of whom eight were living in 1888. They were E. Stuyvesant, Josephine, Elizabeth, Rachel, John O., Nettie, Susie, and Philip Sheridan. Another son Joseph enlisted in the 27th Michigan Volunteer Infantry Regiment and was killed in 1863.

In 1876, at the International Peace Union convention at Carpenters' Hall in Philadelphia, there was a proposal to convert swords into useful tools. Greusel was the first to step forward and volunteer to donate his own sword. He said it was the sword he carried during the Mexican–American War and the Civil War and that he originally planned to give it to his heirs. Greusel's sword was converted into a pruning hook and presented to the conference on the following day. In the years since the war, Greusel had become "an ardent advocate of peace through disarmament". Greusel died in Aurora, Illinois on April 25, 1896, and was buried in Aurora, Illinois at the Spring Lake Cemetery. His gravestone reads "General N. Greusel".
