= 113th United States Colored Infantry Regiment =

6th Arkansas Colored Infantry Regiment 113th U.S. Colored Infantry Regiment
- Flag of the United States, 1863-1865
- Active: August 11, 1864, to September 15, 1866
- Country: United States
- Allegiance: Union
- Branch: Infantry
- Size: Regiment
- Nickname: 6th Regiment Arkansas Volunteer Infantry (African Descent)
- Engagements: American Civil War

Commanders
- Commander: Lt Col. Lawriston W. Whipple

The 113th United States Colored Infantry (formerly the 6th Arkansas Colored Infantry Regiment) was an infantry regiment that served in the Union Army during the American Civil War. The regiment was composed of African American enlisted men commanded by white officers and was authorized by the Bureau of Colored Troops which was created by the United States War Department on May 22, 1863.

== Organization ==
The regiment was organized at Little Rock, Arkansas, June 25, 1864, from the 6th Arkansas Colored Infantry and assigned to the VII Corps (Union Army). The unit was later re-designated as the 113th United States Colored Infantry.

== Service ==
The regiment was attached to 1st Division, 7th Corps, Dept. of Arkansas, to January, 1865. The regiment was attached to Colored Brigade, 7th Corps, until February, 1865.

General Orders No. 14, Department of Arkansas, dated February 1, 1865, from Little Rock, included the 113th United States Colored Infantry is reported as belonging to the 2nd Brigade of the 1st Division of the 7th Army Corps.

The regiment was attached to 2nd Brigade, 1st Division, 7th Corps, until April 1865. The regiment was assigned to post and garrison duty at Little Rock, Ark., for its entire term of service.

== Consolidated ==
The regiment was consolidated with the 11th Regiment United States Colored Infantry (Old) and the 112th U.S. Colored Infantry on April 1, 1865. The 113th United States Colored Infantry were mustered out a year later, on April 9, 1866.

== See also ==
- List of Arkansas Civil War Union units
- List of United States Colored Troops Civil War Units
- United States Colored Troops
- Arkansas in the American Civil War
