= Lyman G. Bennett =

American teacher, surveyor, civil engineer, and Union Army soldier

Lyman Gibson Bennett
- Lyman Gibson Bennett, 1863, as Major, 4th Arkansas Cavalry
- Born: 1 August 1832; Schuyler County, New York, United States
- Died: 24 February 1904 (aged 71); Springfield, Missouri, United States
- Military career
- Allegiance: United States of America
- Branch: United States Army
- Service years: 1861–1864 (USA)
- Rank: Major (USV)
- Units: 36th Illinois Volunteer Infantry; 4th Arkansas Volunteer Cavalry
- Conflicts: American Civil War: Battle of Pea Ridge; Price's Raid; Sioux Wars: Powder River Expedition; Powder River Battles
- Other work: Teacher, Surveyor, and Civil Engineer.

Lyman Gibson Bennett (1832 – 1904) was an American teacher, surveyor, and civil engineer from Schuyler County, New York, who served the Union army during the American Civil War.

== Early life ==
Lyman Gibson Bennett was born on 1 August 1832, in Schuyler County, New York, the son of Charles Mitchell Bennett (11 May 1807 – 29 July 1882) and his wife Louisa Canfield (18 May 1810 – 14 April 1886). He was educated in New York state, then in 1849 when he was 17, his family moved to Oswego, in Kendall County, Illinois. Bennett taught school there for five years, then trained as a surveyor and civil engineer. He worked as a railroad surveyor, and later served as the county surveyor of Kendall County, Illinois.

Bennett spent most of 1857 in Minnesota in an unrewarding attempt to homestead, first near Winona, then in the Faribault District near Ashland. He supported himself by selling maps through subscription and by employment as a member of the surveying team for the proposed Transit Railroad. He terminated his experience in Minnesota by returning to Illinois late in 1857 to resume teaching school. On 18 December 1859 in Kendall County, Illinois, he married Melissa Emma Lyon (1838–1904).

== American Civil War ==
In 1861, Bennett enlisted as a Corporal in Co. E of the 36th Illinois Volunteer Infantry Regiment, a three-year unit known as the “Fox River Regiment.” Military authorities took advantage of his skills, assigning him to engineering duties at Rolla and St. Louis, Missouri throughout late 1861 and early 1862. His detached duty, which included map-making and work on fortifications, ended in time for Bennett to join his regiment for the Battle of Pea Ridge, Arkansas on March 7, 1862. He was permanently detached from the 36th Illinois after the battle to serve on the engineering staff of Brigadier General Samuel Ryan Curtis. He sketched the Pea Ridge battlefield and was the cartographer of the Army of the Southwest as it marched across Missouri to Helena, Arkansas. In 1863, Bennett took a commission as major of the 4th Arkansas Volunteer Cavalry Regiment (United States), which he helped raise and organize. He resigned and was honorably discharged in August 1864.

As a civilian, Bennett again joined the engineering department of General Samuel Curtis, then commanding the Department of Kansas. He mapped the 1864 battlefields of Price's Raid, and was sent to inspect the army's installations along the stage line to Denver, Colorado.

== Sioux Wars ==
In 1865, Major General Grenville M. Dodge ordered the Powder River Expedition as a campaign against the Sioux, Cheyenne, and Arapaho. It was commanded by Brigadier General Patrick E. Connor and was to have three independently marching columns of soldiers. Bennett was given the position of chief engineering officer of Colonel Nelson D. Cole's right, or eastern column of the expedition, which operated from July 1 to October 4, 1865. As the chief engineering officer, he worked to build roads and bridges along the route that could accommodate the columns' 140 wagons and pack train. Bennett also mapped their route, some of which had never been mapped before.

During the campaign, he participated in the Powder River Battles at Alkali Creek (Sept. 1), Dry Creek (Sept. 8), and the Little Powder River (Sept. 10). At Dry Creek, Bennett rode with groups of dismounted soldiers deployed in skirmish lines, which made him a conspicuous target. He was nearly hit by multiple bullets fired by Native American warriors, with one passing by his head, and another striking the ground under his horse. Bennett then led the final charge of the engagement in which the soldiers drove the remaining warriors off a bluff and away from the battlefield. On September 12, 1865, he was the first person to describe in writing the Terrett Butte, a landmark along the Powder River.

== Later life ==
Bennett left the army's employment in 1866 to return to Illinois. He moved to Springfield, Missouri, in 1880, purchasing a farm on the western edge of the city. He continued to work as an engineer and surveyor, platting additions to the City of Springfield, and surveying railroad lines in Missouri and Oklahoma. Lyman Gibson Bennett died in Springfield, Missouri on 24 February 1904, and is buried there. Bennett and his wife had four children.

== Legacy ==
The book Powder River Odyssey: Nelson Cole's Western Campaign of 1865, The Journals of Lyman G. Bennett and Other Eyewitness Accounts by David E. Wagner (2009), was written almost entirely from the journal that Bennett kept in 1865.

== See also ==
- 36th Illinois Volunteer Infantry Regiment
- 4th Arkansas Volunteer Cavalry Regiment, (United States)
- Powder River Expedition
