= 36th Illinois Infantry Regiment =

36th Regiment Illinois Volunteer Infantry, "The Fox River Regiment"
- Illinois state flag
- Active: Sept. 23, 1861–Oct. 8, 1865
- Country: United States
- Allegiance: (United States) Union; Illinois
- Branch: Infantry
- Nickname: Fox River Regiment
- Equipment: Springfield Model 1842 (1861–62)
- Engagements: Battle of Pea Ridge; Battle of Perryville; Battle of Stones River; Battle of Chickamauga; Battle of Missionary Ridge; Battle of Resaca; Battle of Atlanta; Battle of Kennesaw Mountain; Battle of Franklin; Battle of Nashville

Commanders
- Notable commanders: Nicholas Greusel

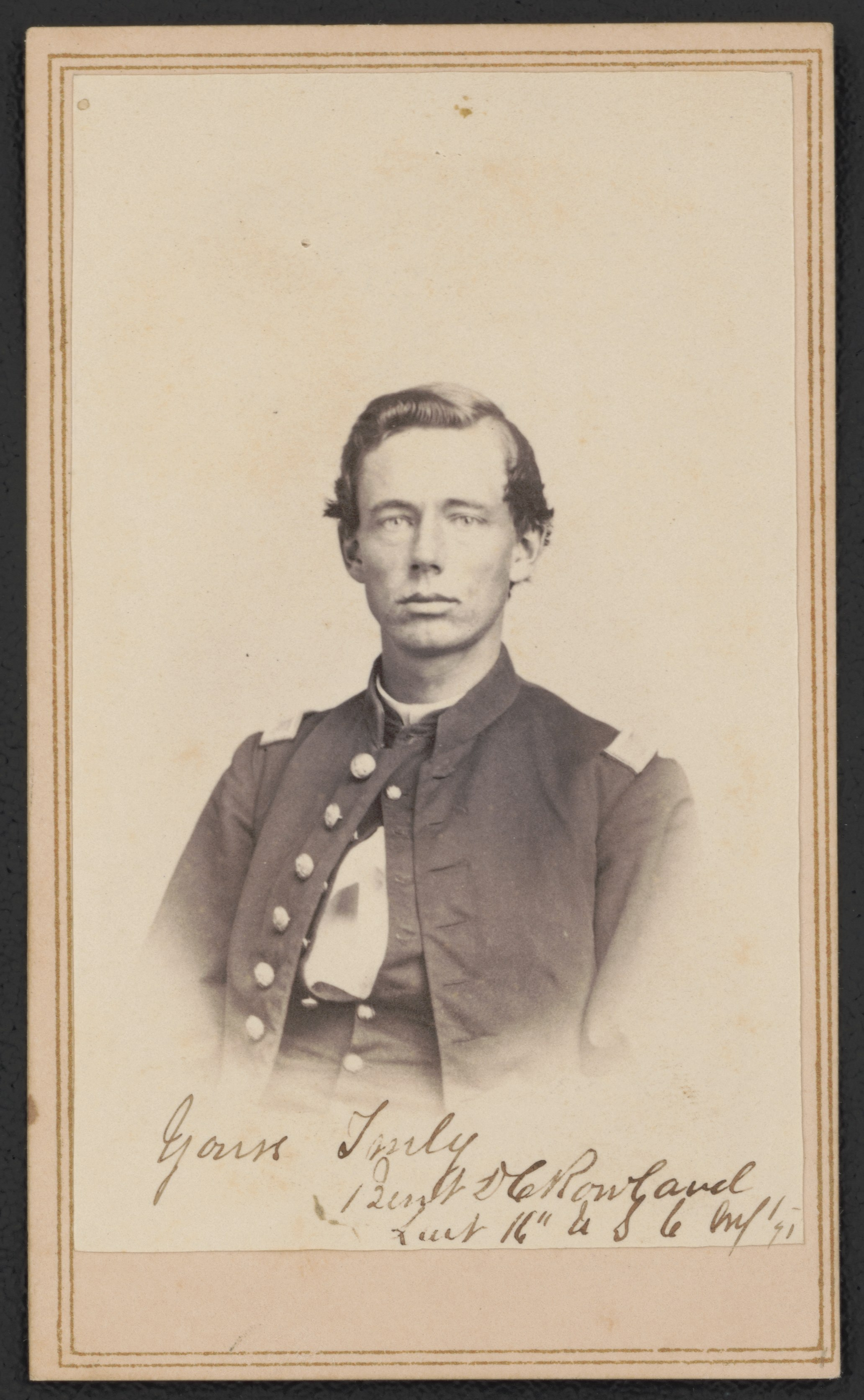
Lieutenant Bent D.C. Rowland of 36th Illinois Infantry Regiment. From the Liljenquist Family Collection of Civil War Photographs, Prints and Photographs Division, Library of Congress

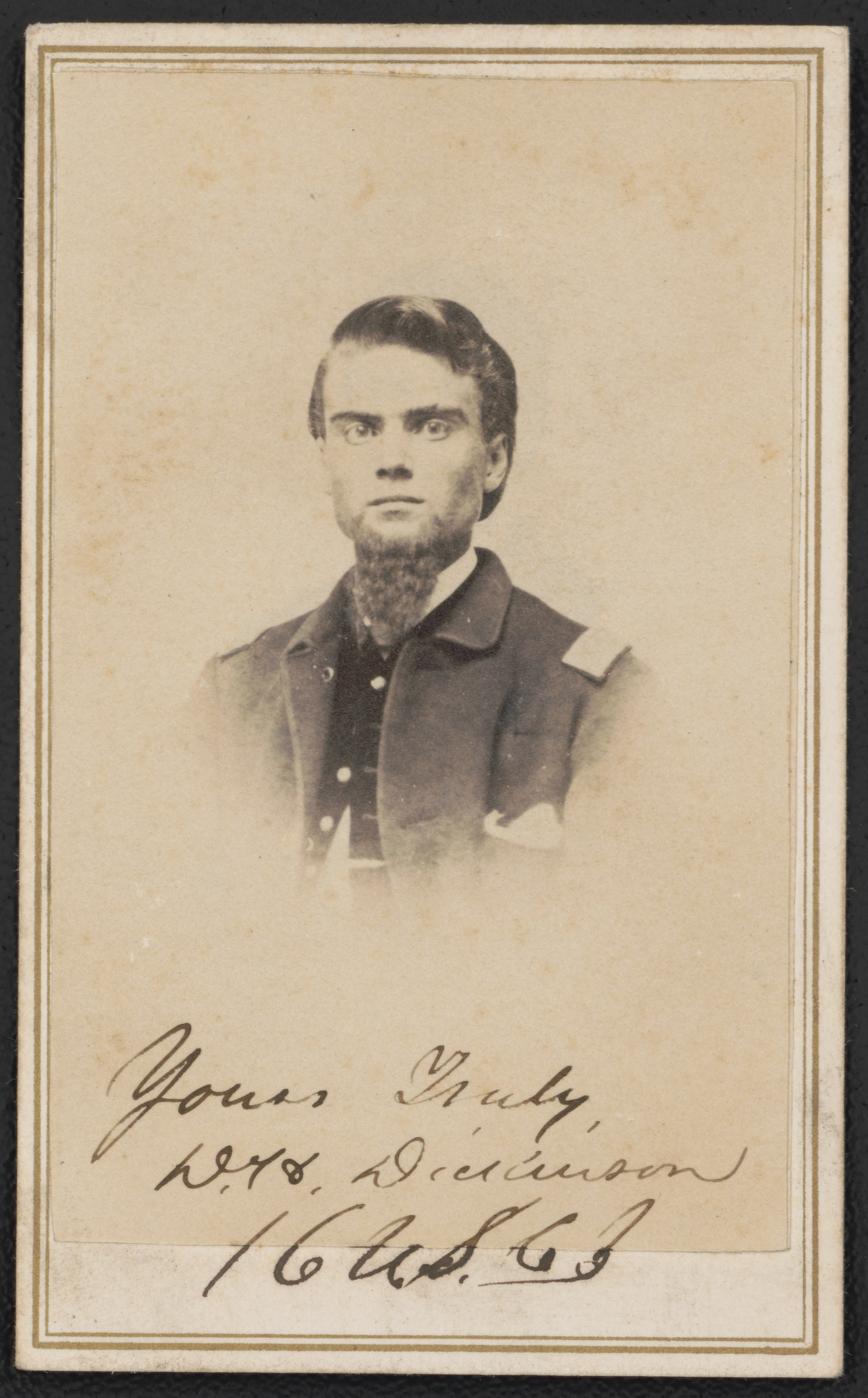
Corporal David H. Dickinson of Co. K, 36th Illinois Infantry Regiment

The 36th Regiment Illinois Volunteer Infantry was an infantry regiment that served in the Union Army during the American Civil War. The unit was mustered into service in September 1861. The regiment fought at the battles of Pea Ridge, Perryville, Stones River, Chickamauga, Missionary Ridge, Resaca, Kennesaw Mountain, Atlanta, Franklin, and Nashville. It was mustered out in October 1865.

== Service ==
The 36th Illinois Infantry was organized at Camp Hammond at Montgomery, Illinois, just south of Aurora, and mustered into Federal service on September 23, 1861, for three years service. The regiment was mustered out on October 8, 1865.

== Organizations ==
Organized at Aurora, Ill., and mustered in on September 23, 1861. Moved to St. Louis, Mo., thence to Rolla, Mo.. September 24–29, 1861. Attached to Dept. of Missouri to January, 1862. 2nd Brigade, Army of Southwest Missouri, to March, 1862. 2nd Brigade, 1st Division, Army of Southwest Missouri, to June, 1862. 1st Brigade, 5th Division, Army Mississippi, to September, 1862. 37th Brigade, 11th Division, Army of the Ohio, to October, 1862. 37th Brigade, 11th Division, 3rd Corps, Army Ohio, to November, 1862. 1st Brigade, 3rd Division, Right Wing, 14th Army Corps, Army of the Cumberland, to January, 1863. 1st Brigade, 3rd Division, 20th Army Corps, Army of the Cumberland, to October, 1863. 1st Brigade, 2nd Division, 4th Army Corps, to August, 1865. Dept. of Texas, to September, 1865.

== History ==
SERVICE.--Duty at Rolla, Mo., until January 14, 1862. Expedition against Freeman's forces November 1–9, 1861. Curtis' Campaign against Price in Missouri and Arkansas January to March, 1862. Advance on Springfield February 2–13. Pursuit of Price into Arkansas February 14–29. Battles of Pea Ridge, Ark., March 6–8. At Keitsville, Mo., until April 5. March to Batesville, Ark., April 5-May 3. Moved to Cape Girardeau, Mo., May 11–22, thence to Hamburg Landing, Tenn., May 23–29. Occupation of Corinth, Miss., May 30. Pursuit to Booneville May 31-June 6. Duty at Rienzi until September 6. Moved to Covington, Ky., thence to Louisville, Ky., September 6–19. Pursuit of Bragg into Kentucky October 1–16. Battle of Perryville, October 8. March to Nashville, Tenn., October 16-November 7. Duty there until December 26. Reconnaissance toward Clarksville November 15–20. Reconnaissance to Mill Creek November 27. Advance on Murfreesboro, Tenn., December 26–30. Battle of Stone's River December 30–31, 1862, and January 1–3, 1863. At and near Murfreesboro until June. Expedition toward Columbia March 4–14. Middle Tennessee or Tullahoma Campaign June 24-July 7. Occupation of Middle Tennessee until August 15. Passage of Cumberland Mountains and Tennessee River and Chickamauga (Ga.) Campaign August 16-September 22. Battle of Chickamauga, Ga., September 19–20. Siege of Chattanooga September 24-November 23. Chattanooga. Ringgold Campaign November 23–27. Orchard Knob November 23–24. Mission Ridge November 25. Pursuit to Graysville November 26–27. March to relief of Knoxville November 28-December 8. Operations in East Tennessee until January, 1864. Regiment Veteranize January 1, 1864, and Veterans on furlough until March. Atlanta (Ga.) Campaign May 1 to September 8. Demonstration on Rocky Faced Ridge May 8–11. Buzzard's Roost Gap May 8–9. Demonstration on Dalton May 9–13. Battle of Resaca May 14–15. Adairsville May 17. Near Kingston May 18–19. Cassville May 19. Advance on Dallas May 22–25. Operations on line of Pumpkin Vine Creek and battles about Dallas, New Hope Church and Allatoona Hills May 25-June 5. Operations about Marietta and against Kenesaw Mountain June 10-July 2. Pine Hill June 11–14. Lost Mountain June 15–17. Assault on Kenesaw June 27. Ruff's Station, Smyrna Camp Ground, July 4. Chattahoochie River July 5–17. Buckhead, Nancy's Creek, July 18. Peach Tree Creek July 19–20. Siege of Atlanta July 22-August 25. Flank movement on Jonesboro August 25–30. Battle of Jonesboro August 31-September 1. Lovejoy Station September 2–6. Pursuit of Hood, into Alabama October 1–26. Nashville Campaign November–December. Columbia, Duck River, November 24–27. Spring Hill November 29. Battle of Franklin November 30. Battle of Nashville December 15–16. Pursuit of Hood to the Tennessee River December 17–28. At Huntsville, Ala., until March, 1865. Operations in East Tennessee March 15-April 22. Moved to Nashville and duty there until June. Moved to New Orleans, La., June 15–23. Duty at Headquarters of General P. H. Sheridan, Commanding Dept. of the Gulf, to October. Mustered out October 8 and discharged at Springfield, Ill, October 27, 1865.

== Total strength and casualties ==
The regiment suffered 11 officers and 193 enlisted men who were killed in action or who died of their wounds and 1 officer and 127 enlisted men who died of disease, for a total of 332 fatalities.

== Commanders ==
- Colonel Nicholas Greusel - resigned on February 7, 1863. Colonel Greusel was a native of Bavaria, born on July 4, 1817, emigrated with his family to the United States in the summer of 1834.
- Colonel Silas Miller - died of wounds received at the Battle of Kennesaw Mountain on July 27, 1864.
- Lieutenant Colonel Benjamin F. Campbell - mustered out with the regiment.
- Lieutenant Colonel Porter Olsen, killed at Franklin, Tennessee.

== Notable Members ==
- Surgeon Jethro A. Hatch.
- Corporal Lyman G. Bennett

== See also ==
- List of Illinois Civil War Units
- Illinois in the American Civil War
- 'History of the 36th Regiment Illinois Volunteers, During the War of the Rebellion', Bennett, L.G. and Haigh, Wm. M., Knickerbocker and Hodder, Aurora, Ill, 1876, written by members of the 36th, elected as Regimental historians
- Company B of the 36th Illinois Regiment of Volunteers: Living History

== Notes ==
Attribution
