= 1st Arkansas Light Artillery Battery (Union) =

- Flag of the United States, 1863–1865
- Active: January 1863 – August 30, 1865
- Disbanded: August 30, 1865
- Country: United States
- Allegiance: Union
- Branch: Artillery
- Size: battery
- Engagements: American Civil War: Camden Expedition; Battle of Prairie D'Ane; Battle of Van Buren; Battle of Camden; Battle of Poison Spring; Battle of Jenkins' Ferry

The 1st Arkansas Light Artillery Battery (1863–1865) was an artillery battery that served in the Union Army during the American Civil War. Although Arkansas joined the Confederate States of America in 1861, not all of its citizens supported secession.

== Organization ==
In January 1863, Denton D. Stark, then Adjutant of the 1st Regiment Arkansas Volunteer Cavalry (Union), was authorized to raise the first battery of Arkansas light artillery. By April 1 the battery was full but was not mustered into service until August 31. The men were principally residents of Benton, Washington, Madison, Crawford, Sebastian, Franklin, Johnson, and Sevier counties. The battery was stationed at Fayetteville, Arkansas during the period January–April 1863, and began moving to Springfield, Missouri on April 25. It arrived on 4 May and remained on duty there until September 21, including an expedition from Springfield into Arkansas and Indian Territory from September 7 to 19. They were near Enterprise, Missouri on September 15. The battery returned to Fayetteville on September 21 and remained there until March 1864, attached to District of Southwest Missouri, Department Missouri, during that time. In March 1864 it was placed under the command of 2nd Brigade, District of the Frontier, 7th Army Corps, Department of Arkansas, until January 1865, when it was placed under the command of Artillery, 3rd Division, 7th Army Corps, until February 1865. From then until it was disbanded, it was under the command of 1st Brigade, 3rd Division, 7th Army Corps.

== Service ==
From 4 May to September 21, 1863, the battery was stationed at Springfield, Missouri, receiving while their guns and equipment. In September, Lieutenant Robert Thompson led one section of the battery in an expedition under Colonel M. Larue Harrison, through southwestern Missouri and northwestern Arkansas, in pursuit of Colonel Coffee's command, then raiding in that section of country, and proceeded thence to Fayetteville, Arkansas. Under Captain Stark, the remaining two sections left Springfield on September 21, 1863, for Fayetteville, first marching to Greenfield, Missouri, under Colonel Harrison, who was then in pursuit of General Shelby. Moving then to Fayetteville, on October 20 one section of the battery under Colonel Brooks engaged the rebels at Cross Timbers, Missouri. The battery remained at Fayetteville until March 19, 1864, when, by order of Brigadier General Thayer, it marched to Fort Smith, Arkansas. On March 23 it joined the expedition to Camden, forming a part of Colonel Adams' brigade. It was present in the skirmish at Moscow, on April 13, with four guns in action, and relieved the 2nd Indiana battery, under fire from rebel artillery. Leaving Camden on April 28 with the retreating force under General Steele, it reached Little Rock on 3 May, and moved thence with the frontier division of the Army of Arkansas to Fort Smith. In October 1864, one section of the battery, under Lieutenant Mayes, was sent with other troops in pursuit of Colonel Gano, who had captured a supply train between Fort Scott and Fort Smith, making a forced march to Cabin Creek, north of Fort Gibson, where they came up with the retreating rebel force; however the enemy escaped without an engagement. The battery occupied Fort No. 2, at Fort Smith, until August 30, 1865, when it was mustered out.

The group participated in fighting at Cross Timbers on October 15 and 20, 1863. It moved to Fort Smith on March 19, 1864, then participated in General Steele's expedition to Camden (March 23 – May 3, 1864); it was near Prairie d'Ann from April 9 to 13, near Van Buren on April 12, near Camden on 15 April 15, near Poison Springs on April 18, and near Jenkins' Ferry, Saline River, on April 30. The group departed for Fort Smith on 3 May, arriving 16 May. It participated in the action at Prior Creek on September 18, 1864. It remained on garrison duty at Fort Smith and at Fort Gibson until it mustered out in August 1865.

== Mustered out of service ==
The 1st Arkansas Light Artillery Battery mustered out on August 30, 1865.

== See also ==
- List of Arkansas Civil War Union units
- List of United States Colored Troops Civil War Units
- Arkansas in the American Civil War

== Bibliography ==
- Dyer, Frederick H. (1959). A Compendium of the War of the Rebellion. Sagamore Press, Inc. Thomas Yoseloff, Publisher. New York. LCCN 59-12963
