= 4th Arkansas Cavalry Regiment (Union) =

4th Regiment Arkansas Volunteer Cavalry
- Active: December 1863–June 30, 1865
- Disbanded: June 30, 1865
- Country: United States of America
- Allegiance: Union
- Branch: Cavalry
- Size: Regiment
- Engagements: American Civil War: Battle of Jenkins' Ferry

The 4th Regiment Arkansas Volunteer Cavalry was organized in 1863 at Little Rock December. Attached to Post of Little Rock, Arkansas, 7th Army Corps, Department of Arkansas, to May, 1864. 3rd Brigade, 1st Division, 7th Army Corps, Department of Arkansas, to September, 1864. 2nd Brigade, Cavalry Division, 7th Army Corps, to February, 1865. Unassigned, 7th Army Corps, to March, 1865. Cavalry Brigade, Little Rock, Arkansas, 7th Corps, to June, 1865.

== Service ==
The unit served at Little Rock, Arkansas, until June 1865. During this period, they participated in various engagements and reconnaissance missions. On February 15, 1864, they were involved in a skirmish at Saline River, Arkansas. They moved to Cedar Glade on March 1 and conducted a scout to Benton from March 27 to 31. On March 30, they engaged at Mount Elba, and on April 15, they fought at Jenkins' Ferry near Camden. Between May 15 and 17, they were present at Dardanelle.

Throughout July, the unit took part in operations in Arkansas against guerrillas, including actions near Benton on July 6, in Montgomery County on July 11, at Caddo Gap on July 12, and at Fair's Mills and Bayou des Arc on July 14. They also engaged at Saline River on July 16. In September, they conducted a scout to Benton on the 6th and 7th, followed by a reconnaissance toward Monticello and Mount Elba from October 4 to 11, and another reconnaissance to Princeton from October 19 to 23. On October 23, they participated in a skirmish at Hurricane Creek.

In November, they carried out a scout from Devall's Bluff to Searcy and Clinton, lasting from the 9th to the 15th. Earlier in the year, from September 25 to October 13, they undertook an expedition from Little Rock to Fort Smith, which included skirmishes at Clarksville on September 28 and October 9, as well as engagements at White Oak Creek on September 29.

In the spring of 1865, they conducted a scout from Little Rock to the Saline River from April 26 to 29, and another from May 6 to 11, from Little Rock to Bayou Metoe and Little Bayou. The unit was mustered out of service on June 30, 1865.

== Notable Members ==
- Major Lyman G. Bennett
- Colonel Lafayette Gregg

== See also ==
- List of Arkansas Civil War Union units
- Arkansas in the American Civil War

== Bibliography ==
- Dyer, Frederick H. (1959). A Compendium of the War of the Rebellion. Sagamore Press, Inc. Thomas Yoseloff, Publisher. New York. LCCN 59-12963
