= 4th Arkansas Infantry Regiment (Union) =

4th Regiment Arkansas Volunteer Infantry (Union)
- Flag of the United States, 1865–1867
- Active: March 25, 1863–August 10, 1865
- Disbanded: August 10, 1865
- Country: United States
- Allegiance: Union
- Branch: Infantry
- Size: Regiment
- Engagements: American Civil War

The 4th Regiment Arkansas Volunteer Infantry (Union) (1863–1865) was an infantry regiment that served in the Union Army during the American Civil War. Although Arkansas joined the Confederate States of America in 1861, not all of its citizens supported secession. Around 48 infantry regiments were established in Arkansas to serve in the Confederate Army during the American Civil War. However, it is noteworthy that 11 additional regiments were also formed in Arkansas and served in the Union Army.

== Organization ==
On October 4, 1863, the commanding general department of the Missouri authorized Edward J. Brooks, a resident of Fayetteville, Arkansas, to raise a regiment of infantry within the state. The unit was to be named the 4th Arkansas Infantry Volunteers, and Brooks was appointed as the provisional colonel. The main meeting point for the regiment was set to be Fayetteville, with additional branch rendezvous points in Fort Smith and other locations in western Arkansas, as deemed appropriate by Brooks.

Ira D. Bronson, a former captain of Company A, detailed the challenges faced in recruiting soldiers for this regiment, as well as its activities during the Old War. This information was conveyed to the office in a communication dated September 18, 1865, from Hickory, Illinois. From which the following extracts are made: "On the 10th of December, 1863, Captain H. S. Greeno, 6th Kansas cavalry, was detailed on recruiting service for the 4th Arkansas infantry, and placed in charge of the recruiting office at Fort Smith. Other recruiting offices were established in western Arkansas, but because the 2d Arkansas infantry was in process of formation, and had nearly exclusive control of recruiting for infantry, and also that the 2d, 3d and 4th Arkansas cavalry, and the 2d Kansas cavalry, were recruiting in the State, and a large portion of those who were disposed to enlist preferred the cavalry arm of the service, recruiting for the 4th Arkansas infantry was very slow and tedious. "About the middle of March, 1864; I had fifty men recruited and stationed at Fort Smith; Lieutenant Hunter had the same number at Fayetteville - other recruiting officers had a number each, making in all about one hundred and eighty men. Brave and efficient recruiting officers were continually within the rebel lines, and many men were in this way picked up.

== Service ==
"On the 10th of April, 1864, Captain Greeno, with a number of recruiting officers, accompanied General Steel's expedition to Camden, hoping thereby to secure a sufficient number of recruits, with those already raised, to organize a major's command. Captain Greeno succeeded in obtaining a large number of recruits, and forwarded them with a train to Little Rock,' but unfortunately they were captured with it before reaching Pine Bluff. "The headquarters of the regiment remained at Clarksville, Arkansas, until the 18th day of May, 1864, the troops meantime acting a conspicuous part in defending the post against the combined efforts of the guerrillas of western Arkansas, aided by a portion of Shelby's command that had returned to the north side of the Arkansas river. My detachment had frequent engagements with them, scarcely a day passing without our taking some prisoners.: "On or about the 20th day of May, 1864, Captain Goss, 6th Kansas cavalry, commanding the post of Clarksville, having ascertained that a large force of rebels had crossed the Arkansas river, and were threatening the post with overwhelming numbers, ordered an abandonment of the place, and fell back on Fort Smith. Upon our arrival there the detachment of the 4th v Arkansas infantry was placed on duty as an extreme outpost south. "While stationed near Port Smith Captain Greeno received orders to proceed with a portion of his command into southern Arkansas, and move out the families of federal soldiers, who ] had been plundered and maltreated by the rebel troops, consisting of bushwhackers, Indians, and renegades, prowling about in that portion of the State. Several trips of this description were made, and frequent encounters with the enemy occurred. "On the 15th day of July we were ordered to Little Rock, and for a time after our arrival did outpost duty. On the 25th of July my company was mustered in. At this time 'there } were on the regimental rolls two hundred and twenty-three names, a portion of whom were recruited by Lieutenants Hunter and Temnant, and partially so for cavalry-were unwilling to serve as infantry-and were transferred to the 4th Arkansas cavalry. Captain Greeno was also transferred, and on the 16th day of October, 1864, was mustered as a major in that regiment.

== Mustered out of service ==
I was thus left in command of the detachment which, on the 2d day of October, 1864, was assigned to the 2d Arkansas infantry for duty. On the 28th day of the same month all the enlisted men of our regiment were transferred to the 2d Arkansas infantry for assignment to companies. This assignment was afterwards confirmed in orders from the War Department and the officers of the regiment, though mostly retained in service, were left without a command. Lieutenant R. S. Crampton, regimental quartermaster, resigned prior to the transfer, and Assistant Surgeon B. Blanchard was mustered out, to be mustered in again as surgeon, having received an appointment as such, though he was never in fact re-mustered. "March 28, 1865, the order of assignment was so amended as to include myself as captain, and William W. Tibbs as second lieutenant, who, with seventy-three men, were formally assigned to company I, 2d Arkansas infantry, the transfer to date from October 25, 1864. "Out of the number recruited for the 4th Arkansas infantry forty-five (45) deserted, thirty (30) died, thirty (30) were captured, forty-five (45) were transferred to the 4th Arkansas cavalry, and seventy-three (73) as stated above.

== See also ==
- List of Arkansas Civil War Union units
- List of United States Colored Troops Civil War Units
- Arkansas in the American Civil War

== Bibliography ==
- Dyer, Frederick H. (1959). A Compendium of the War of the Rebellion. New York and London. Thomas Yoseloff, Publisher. LCCN 59-12963.
- Bishop, Albert W. (1867). Report of the Adjutant General of Arkansas, for the Period of the Late Rebellion, and to November 1, 1866., (Washington : Govt. print. off., 1867).
