= 2nd Arkansas Infantry Regiment (Union) =

2nd Regiment Arkansas Volunteer Infantry (Union)
- Flag of the United States, 1863–1865
- Active: March 25, 1863–August 10, 1865
- Disbanded: August 10, 1865
- Country: United States
- Allegiance: Union
- Branch: Infantry
- Size: Regiment
- Engagements: American Civil War: Battle of Prairie D'Ane

The 2nd Regiment Arkansas Volunteer Infantry (Union) (1863–1865) was an infantry regiment that served in the Union Army during the American Civil War. Although Arkansas joined the Confederate States of America in 1861, not all of its citizens supported secession. Arkansas formed some 48 infantry regiments to serve in the Confederate Army, but also formed another 11 regiments that served in the Union Army.

== Organization ==
The authority for organizing the 2d Arkansas infantry volunteers was transmitted by the Secretary of War to Major General J. M. Schofield, commanding the Department of the Missouri, sometime in the month of August, 1863, precise date unknown.

In conformity with that authority, Major General Schofield, in paragraph 5, of Special Order No. 238, dated headquarters Department of the Missouri, St. Louis, Missouri, September 1, 1863, delegated the general charge and supervision of the organization of the regiment to Brigadier General John McNeil, commanding the District of Southwest Missouri, instructing him to appoint some officer to take the immediate charge of the organization, under the supervision of General McNeil.

The order further declared that the regiment should be composed of and organized from all recruits that had already been enlisted, and from all that might thereafter be enlisted, for Arkansas infantry from citizens of Arkansas in southwest Missouri and northwest Arkansas, until the organization of the regiment was completed.

The officer taking the immediate supervision of the organization was empowered to recommend, with the concurrence of Brigadier General McNeil, competent and efficient men to fill the positions of company officers, taken, as far as practicable, 0 from the citizens of Arkansas, the recommendations to be sent to headquarters department of the Missouri for reference to the Secretary of War, the field and staff officers to be nominated by the major general commanding the department of the Missouri, "from such reliable, competent, and efficient citizens or officers as, in his opinion, had good claims to the positions to be filled."

In obedience to the above order General McNeil entrusted the organization of the regiment to me by paragraph 1, Special Order No. 170, dated headquarters district of southwest Missouri, Springfield, Missouri, August 31, 1863, directing that Springfield, Missouri, should be the rendezvous of the regiment, there being at that time no other point possessing the same advantages necessary for a rendezvous.

The rendezvous was, however, -ultimately changed to Fort Smith, Arkansas, by paragraph 5, Special Order No. 317, dated headquarters department of the Missouri, St. Louis, Missouri, November 20,- 1863, Fort Smith having been occupied by the federal troops in September, 1863.

In the month of January, 1864, the e organization of four companies having been completed, the lieutenant colonel, adjutant, quartermaster, and officers of companies A, B, C, and D were appointed by the Secretary of War, and orders for their muster issued by Major General Schofield.

The organization of the regiment was completed March 13, 1864, at which time the aggregate enlisted strength was 913; but owing to the impossibility of procuring a mustering officer there were but 11 officers and about 600 men mustered.

== Service ==
In this condition the regiment was ordered into the field by Brigadier General J. M. Thayer, commanding district of the frontier, March 20, 1864, to take part in the expedition south, commanded by Major General Steele.

Leaving Clarksville, Arkansas, on the 24th day of March 1864, with eight companies, the regiment reported to Brigadier General Thayer on the 27th day of March, 1864, fifteen miles west of Danville, Arkansas, and from that time forward moved with the 3d division 7th army corps in that disastrous campaign.

The regiment was engaged in the battles of Prairie is d'Anne, on the 13th of April, and Jenkins's Ferry on the 30th of the same month, in both of which engagements the regiment lost several men killed and wounded. The losses incurred by these battles, deaths caused by sickness, and desertions so reduced the regiment that upon our arrival at Little Rock, Arkansas, the organization was declared incomplete.

The two companies (D and G) which had been left at Clarksville rejoined the regiment at Little Rock, and soon after, with the exception of ysell the officers and enlisted men were all mustered, I being at the time absent with leave, having been wounded at Jenkins's Ferry, but was mustered soon after my return to the regiment, to date from July 6, 1864.oh In the month of July, 1864, the regiment was ordered to Lewisburg, Arkansas, where it remained until the 7th day of September, 1864, when it was forced to evacuate the place and return to Little Rock with the 3d Arkansas cavalry on account of the advance of the enemy under General Price, who crossed the Arkansas river at Dardanelle, thirty miles above Lewisburg.

About this time the regiment lost a great many men from desertion and deaths. Reports were continually reaching the regiment that the families of the men were being cruelly treated by the guerillas, and in consequence the regiment became so reduced that we mustered, on arriving at Little Rock, but 450 enlisted men.

We remained at Little Rock until the 18th day of October, 1864, when we received orders to escort a supply train to Fort Smith, Arkansas, with the intention of remaining there. l Arriving at Fort Smith I reported the regiment to Brigadier General J. Mt. Thayer, commanding 3d division 7th army corps, and was ordered by him to report to Brigadier General John Edwards, commanding 1st brigade 3d division 7th army corps, for duty.

On the 31st day of December, 1864, we received orders from General Edwards to proceed to this place immediately, for the purpose of collecting together the Union people in the country with the view of moving them to Little Rock, on account of an order having been issued for the evacuation of Fort Smith and the surrounding country.

Upon arriving at Clarksville a large number of the men who had deserted at Little Rock and Lewisburg voluntarily rejoined their regiment, and in view of the facts in their cases, have been since restored to duty with loss of pay and allowances during their unauthorized absence, by order of Brigadier General Bussy, commanding 3d division 7th army corps.

The order for the evacuation of the country having been countermanded, the regiment has remained at this place and has done good service to the country by ridding it of guerillas. The regiment now numbers 27 commissioned officers and 581 enlisted men. Very respectfully, your obedient servant,' M. L. STEPHENSON, Colonel, Commanding regiment., Brig. Gen. A. W. BISHOP, Adjutant General of Arkansas, Little Roc?., Arkansas.

On the 2d day of October, 1864, Special Order No. 240, headquarters department of Arkansas, which issued, assigning the 4th Arkansas infantry (whose history is elsewhere given) to the 2d Arkansas infantry for duty, and on the 28th day of the same month another order was issued, transferring the enlisted men of the former regiment to the latter for assignment to companies.

On the 28th day of March, 1865, this last order was amended by including Ira D. Bronson as captain, and William W. Tibbs as 2d lieutenant, who, together with 73 men, were assigned to company I; the transfer to date from October 25, 1864. From this time onward this detachment constituted a portion of the 2d Arkansas infantry, and served with the regiment at Clarksville, Arkansas, and vicinity, until its muster out on the 8th day of August, 1865.

== Mustered out of service ==
The regiment was mustered out on August 8, 1865.

== See also ==
- List of Arkansas Civil War Union units
- List of United States Colored Troops Civil War Units
- Arkansas in the American Civil War
