= 54th United States Colored Infantry Regiment =

- Flag of the United States, 1863-1865
- Active: September 4, 1863, to December 31, 1866
- Country: United States
- Allegiance: Union
- Branch: Infantry
- Size: Regiment
- Nickname: 2nd Regiment Arkansas Volunteer Infantry (African Descent)
- Engagements: American Civil War

Commanders
- 1st Commander: Lieutenant Colonel George W. De Costa
- 2nd Commander: Col. John E. Cone

The 54th United States Colored Infantry was an infantry regiment that served in the Union Army during the American Civil War. The regiment was composed of African American enlisted men commanded by white officers and was authorized by the Bureau of Colored Troops which was created by the United States War Department on May 22, 1863.

== Organization ==
Following the issuance of the Emancipation Proclamation, an organization of African-American troops was commenced in the Mississippi River Valley under the personal supervision of the adjutant-general of the army, Lorenzo Thomas. His first regiment was mustered into service on May 1, 1863, as the 1st Arkansas Volunteers of African Descent, The 2nd Arkansas was one of four regiments of African Americans that was raised in Helena, Phillips County, an important Union held fortified city and naval port on the Mississippi River.

Twenty-one-year-old Minos Miller of the Thirty-sixth Iowa Infantry, stationed at Helena Arkansas wrote in January 1863:

[W]e are rejoicing today over Brags [sic] defeat [at Murfreesboro, Tennessee] and Old Abe's [Emancipation] Proclamation. We got the news last night at 8 o'clock that all the negros was free and them that was able for servis [sic] was to be armed and set to guarding foarts [sic]. I think the Union is safe and all will be over by the forth [sic] of July.

On April 7, Miller attended a speech by Adjutant General of the Army Lorenzo Thomas, who was promoting the raising of black regiments for service in the Union army (under white officers). Reaction to Thomas's address was so favorable that three companies of a hundred soldiers each were recruited immediately, forming the nucleus of the 1st Arkansas Volunteer Infantry Regiment (African Descent).

Encouraged by the response to General Thomas's appeal, army officials made plans to create a second black Arkansas unit. Throughout the remainder of the spring, the first companies of the 2nd Arkansas Volunteer Infantry Regiment (African Descent) were formed. Minos Miller volunteered to serve as an officer in this new regiment. On June 12, he wrote to his mother:

Our regiment is about 300 strong. We are drilling every day. The negros learn fast and will fight well. We have tried ours twice and know they will stand fire.

The Confederates were about to give the entire Federal garrison at Helena an opportunity to "stand fire."

The regiment was organized at large in Arkansas on September 4, 1863, as the 2nd Regiment Arkansas Volunteer Infantry (African Descent) and assigned to the VII Corps (Union Army). The regiment was raised under the command of Lieutenant Colonel George W. De Costa and Major George W. Burchard and was composed primarily of freed slaves in the Arkansas River Valley. On March 11, 1864, the designation of Regiment changed to 54th U. S. Colored Troops.

== Service ==
In the summer of 1863, the regiment, which had not been officially mustered into federal service, as it had not yet gained the required number of troops, was located at Helena, Arkansas, organizing and drilling. The regiment was present for the Confederate attack upon Helena on July 4, 1863, occupying the far left of the union line. The unit remained at Helena from its official formation until May, 1864.

The unit was next ordered to Fort Gibson in Indian Territory and worked on improving the fort's earthwork defenses. The regiment was engaged in the Second Battle of Cabin Creek on September 19, 1864. Confederate forces under the command of Brigadier Generals Richard Montgomery Gano and Stand Watie surprised a Federal supply convoy under the protection of the 2nd Kansas Cavalry. Confederate forces seized approximately 130 wagons of the 300-wagon supply train near the Cabin Creek stockade. The 54th was among reinforcements under Colonel James M. Williams of the Frontier Division 2nd Brigade, which marched from Fort Gibson to recapture the lost convoy wagons. The Federal infantry engaged the Confederates at Pryor's Creek, but the Confederates were able to escape with the supplies under cover of darkness. The battle is remembered as the last major engagement of the Civil War in Indian Territory, and it is estimated that more than $1.5 million in supplies were lost.

Following the Confederate victory at Cabin Creek, the 54th was ordered north to escort refugee and supply trains moving into Kansas from Arkansas. Confederate guerrillas raided several wagon trains along Cow Creek in November 1864, capturing supplies and routing Kansas cavalry detachments. With the skirmishes proving a hindrance to Union supplies in the west, the 54th was ordered to patrol Cow Creek from November 14 through November 28, staving off Rebel skirmishers and ensuring the safe arrival of convoys bound for Fort Leavenworth, Kansas.

The 54th was next moved south to guard against raiders along the Arkansas River. On December 18, 1864, the 54th engaged Rebel skirmishers along the Arkansas River and drove them from the area. The unit moved from Fort Gibson to Fort Smith in early January 1865. The regiment again saw action along the Arkansas River on January 18, 1865, once more successfully driving Rebel forces from the banks of the river. As the war drew toward a close, the 54th continued to search for Confederate raiders, engaging one of the last remaining bands of guerrillas at the Saline River in a series of running skirmishes in the spring of 1865.

General Orders No. 14, Department of Arkansas, dated February 1, 1865, from Little Rock, included the 113th United States Colored Infantry is reported as belonging to the 2nd Brigade of the 1st Division of the 7th Army Corps.

In February 1865, detachments of the 54th U.S.C.T. were relieved from duty guarding the Little Rock to DuVall's Bluff rail road.

At the surrender of the Confederate in the Trans-Mississippi on May 26, 1865, the 54th was stationed in Little Rock as part of a garrison force to oversee the end of guerrilla fighting and to aid in reconstruction. The regiment continued regular duty in the Little Rock area through 1866.

The Regiment participated in the following actions:

- Fort Gibson September 16, 1864.
- Cabin Creek September 19, 1864.
- Cow Creek, Kansas, November 14 and 28, 1864.

== Mustered out of service ==
Mustered out of Federal Service by companies between August 8 and December 31, 1866.

== See also ==
- List of Arkansas Civil War Union units
- List of United States Colored Troops Civil War Units
- United States Colored Troops
- Arkansas in the American Civil War
