= 2nd Arkansas Field Battery =

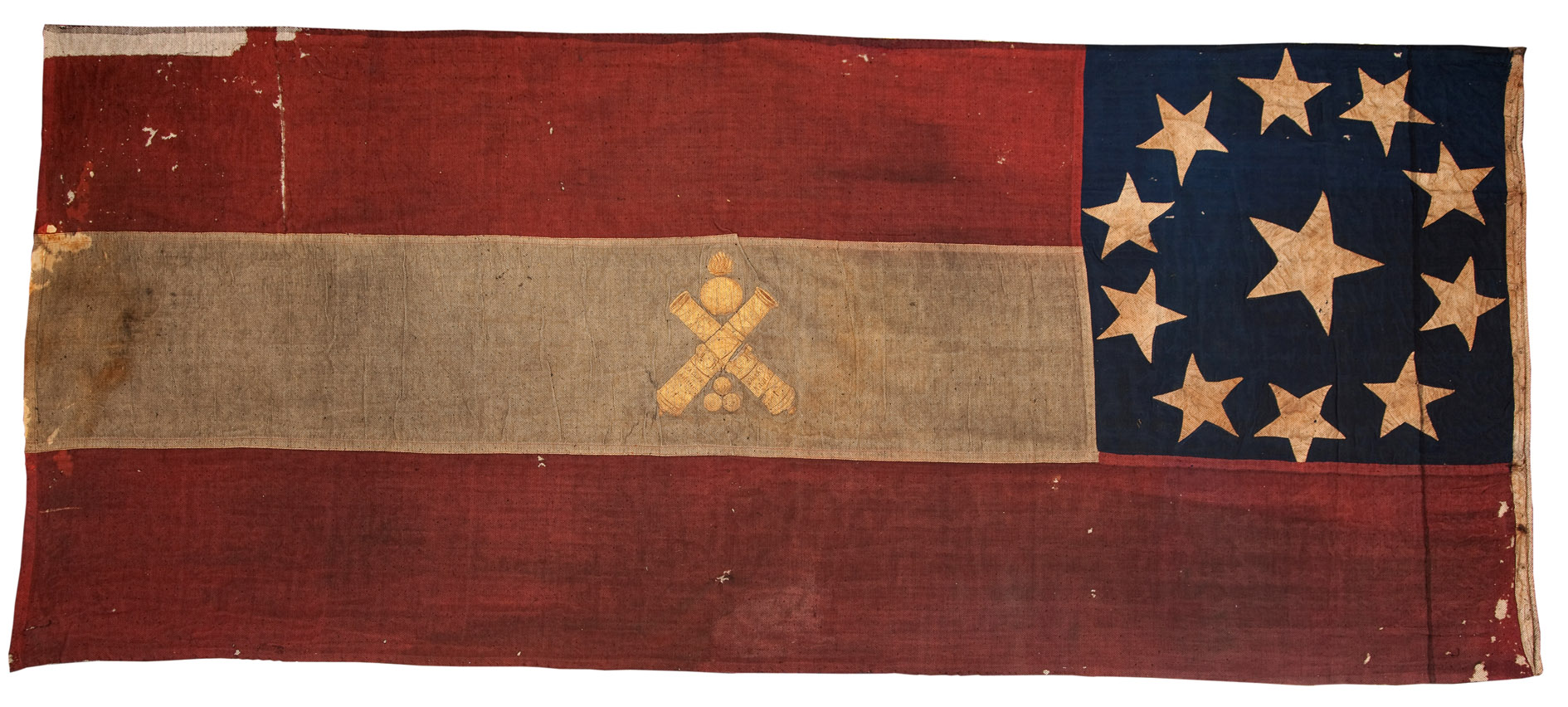
- Confederate 1st National Flag, Dallas Artillery
- Active: 1861–1865
- Disbanded: May 26, 1865
- Country: Confederate States of America
- Allegiance: CSA
- Branch: Artillery
- Size: battery
- Nickname: Dallas Artillery
- Engagements: American Civil War: Battle of Pea Ridge, Battle of Arkansas Post

Commanders
- 1861-1865: Captain William Hart

The 2nd Arkansas Field Battery (1861–1865) was a Confederate Army artillery battery during the American Civil War. It was also known as the Dallas Artillery and Hart's Arkansas Battery. The battery was re-organized on two occasions. Following a charge of cowardice during Battle of Pea Ridge, the battery was ordered to disband. After being cleared of that charge the battery was reorganized and served until it was captured at the Battle of Arkansas Post. After being exchanged and re-organized for the second time, it served until the final surrender of Confederate forces in May 1865.

== Organization ==
The Dallas Artillery was organized at Dallas, Polk County, Arkansas, in the late spring of 1861, and enlisted in Confederate service at Fayetteville on August 1, 1861, with 75 officers and men on the rolls. The original officers included Captain William Hart, First Lieutenant J. W. Thomas, and Second Lieutenant Charles Ringer. The battery was equipped with four 6-pounder guns. No muster rolls for this first organization have been discovered. Officers: Captain William Hart; Lieutenant D. O'Connell; Lieutenant G. W. McIntosh; Second Lieutenant E. A. Dubose; Second Lieutenant James Nolan.

== Service ==
In January 1862, Hart's Battery was assigned to Colonel Louis Herbert's 2nd Brigade of Colonel James McIntosh's Division in northwest Arkansas and the Indian Territory. It was still assigned to the 2nd Brigade when it fought in the Battle of Pea Ridge (Elkhorn Tavern) in Benton County, Arkansas, March 7–8, 1862.

=== Pea Ridge ===
During the first day of the Battle of Pea Ridge, Colonel E. Greer was required to assume command of remaining Confederate forces in the Leetown sector of the battlefield after the death of Brigadier General Ben McCulloch and Brigadier General McIntosh. in his report Greer described the action of Harts battery on the first day:

I discovered Hart's battery of four pieces on a hill in close proximity to the enemy, unsupported by any of our troops. Soon after the discovery Captain Hart opened a heavy fire on the advancing forces from the other side of the hill. I moved my regiment rapidly up to that point and ordered Captain Hart to move his battery some 400 or 500 yards, while my cavalry would cover his rear.

On the second day of the battle Union forces captured two of the battery's guns, along with its colors. General Earl Van Dorn ordered Hart's Battery and Clark's Missouri Battery from reserve into the front line. Hart's Battery arrived first and unlimbered but came under converging fire from twenty-one Federal guns.

Captain Good's [Texas] Battery, Now coming up, was placed to the right of Burbridge's regiment, and opened fire upon the enemy's battery from its position. The enemy, having got the rage of our lines, threw in the shells with great precision and rapidity, concentrating their fire on one point. Wade's battery was ordered up to Good's support, but had scarcely unlimbered when Good's battery retired from the ground. Hart's battery was now ordered to take the place evacuated by Good. Hart's battery did not prove more steady than its predecessor under the enemy's fire and immediately left the field. Report of Col. Henry Little, commanding First Brigade Missouri Volunteers.

Hart's men, who were green and untried, became unnerved by the enemy fire and within minutes limbered to the rear. On reaching Elkhorn Tavern, Hart complained to Van Dorn that the fire had been too hot for them. In anger Van Dorn placed him under arrest for cowardice, redistributed his ammunition to Clark's Battery and ordered Hart's guns to the rear. In a report of the actual strength of McCulloch's Division on March 11, 1862, three days after the battle of Pea Ridge, Hart's remaining strength is listed as 2 Officers, 52 Enlisted men, 3 guns, 3 caissons, no ammunition.

=== Dallas Artillery disbanded ===
In the reorganization of the Confederate Army of the West that took place after the defeat at Pea Ridge, Hart's unit was initially assigned to Brigadier General D. M. Frost's artillery brigade of Major General Sterling Price's Division. The general commanding the Trans-Mississippi District issued General Orders No. 10, dated March 22, 1862, which censured several members of Hart's Battery, and disbanded the battery "for shameful conduct in the presence of the enemy".

Army of the West

Camp Ben McCulloch,

March 24, 1862

General Orders No. 3

I. Because of shameful conduct in the presence of the enemy Harts Battalion Light Artillery is hereby disbanded. The guns, horses, Carriages, and equipage will be at once turned over to the Chief Ordnance officer of Frosts Brigade.

II. Lt. S. H. Calhoun, having been on detached service and not present with his battery at the time referred to in this order, is exempted from the censure herein contained, and having resigned his commission has leave of absence until the pleasure of the President can be known in his case.

Commanders of Brigades will comply with the above order from Gen Hd. Qrs.

By order of Maj Gen Price

Thos. L. Snead AAG

Hart's four remaining 6-pounder guns were reassigned to MacDonald's St. Louis Battery. In General Order No. 7, Headquarters Arty Bgde, dated March 25, from Camp Churchill Clark, near Van Buren Arkansas, "the arty co known as [Wm] Hart's Btry is hereby disbanded-those that wish to reenlist in other btrys can do so to redeem the reputation they have lost of a few bad men of this Btry."

A members of the battery attached themselves to various Arkansas and Missiour commands as General Van Dorn's Army of the West moved east. After boarding steamboats at Des Arc and being transported by water to Memphis and then by rail to Corinth Mississippi, the army arrived just days after the Battle of Shiloh. Captain Hart continued to serve with the Army of the West, attaching himself to Captain David Provence's Battery. The Provence's battery participated in the Battle of Farmington, Mississippi, on May 9, 1862. According to Captain Provence's report, "Captain William Hart, late of Hart's Battery, desired and was permitted to act as gunner at one of the Howitzers, where if reports be true, he served with considerable effect"

After the Battle of Farmington, Captain Hart returned to Arkansas. Other former members of the Dallas Artillery remained with the Army of the West in Northern Mississippi, now under command of Major General Price. Many former members of the battery signed a petition requesting a court of inquiry to clear their names. Eventually a court of inquiry was convened into the allegations against Hart's Battery, which resulted in the following action:

HEADQUARTERS ARMY OF THE WEST,

Priceville, July 17, 1862.

General Orders No. 15.

It having been satisfactorily proven to a court of inquiry, convened for the purpose of investigating the conduct of certain men, formerly members of the artillery company known as Hart's Battery, at the battle of Elkhorn, that those men were guilty of no misconduct on the battle-field, it is hereby ordered that they, viz, Charles E. Steele, M. M. Tice, W. D. Moore, John Kennedy, B. L. Allen, William Masterson, N. B. Milton, and James Pitkins, be, and they are hereby, relieved from the censure contained in General Orders No. 10, dated Headquarters Trans-Mississippi District, Van Buren, Ark., March 22, 1862, disbanding Hart's Battery Light Artillery 'for shameful conduct in the presence of the enemy'.

By order of Major-General Price:

THOMAS L. SNEAD,

Assistant Adjutant-General."

It is not possible to track exactly what became of most of the enlisted personnel of the original Dallas Artillery because no muster roll of this first organization has survived, but a few members are mentioned in the Official Records of the American Civil War. Lieutenant Charles Ringer, became an Ordnance Sergeant of Captain Guibor's 1st Missouri Light Artillery and was subsequently captured at Vicksburg. As late as October 1862, Lieutenant Ringer was instrumental in assisting the members of Harts Battery which had been cleared by the Court of Inquiry obtain pay which they were due at the time the battery was ordered to be disbanded. There are affidavit in the Compiled Service Records of each of the cleared members attesting to the service and pay records of the men, signed by Lieutenant Ringer.

=== Second organization ===
Captain Hart left the Army of the West in northern Mississippi and was back in Arkansas by early June, 1862. Hart apparently rejoined other members of his former unit in Arkansas where he was directed to reform his unit by Major General Hindman. By June 14, 1862, Hart was apparently present and busy reorganizing his command:

Head Quarters Army of the South West

Little Rock Arks. June 14th 1862.

Special Orders No. 4.

Paragraph V. 1st Lieut D.S.O. Cornell is assigned to duty in Capt W. [William] Hart's Company of Artillery, and will report to him with the Ten men, which he now has, for duty.

And June 17, 1862:

Head-Quarters Army of the South West

Little Rock Arks June 17th 1862.

Special Orders No. 7.

X Col F. [Francis] A. Shoup will assume command of Col Pleasant's "1st Trans Miss Infantry". Daniel's Lamar Artillery and [William] Hart's Company of Artillery, and more the same -, the last named with its heavy guns across the Arkansas River at daylight in the morning, and to Devalls Bluff [Arkansas] on White River by such mode as he may consider most, expeditious. If Col [Allison] Nelson is not at Deval's Bluff, Col Shoup will assume command there and adopt the best means practicable, for holding the place and resisting the progress of the Federal Gun Boats & transports up White River. Should Col Nelson be at that place, however, Col Shoup will report to him and remain there as his second in command....

And June 19, 1862:

Head Quarters Army of the South West.

Little Rock Arks June 19th 1862.

Special Orders No 9

II. Col A.C. Robertson will report the men he has in charge, to Capt [William] Hart, to be attached to his Artillery Co, until further orders. ...

IV. Col McAlmont, Enrolling Officer of Pulaski County, will turn over to Lt. O'Connell fifty conscripts, to be attached to Capt [William] Hart's Company of Artillery.

And June 30, 1862:

30th. June:

Nelson to Newton

Your communications by the cars are just in, owing to a fire on the train which caused considerable loss, which I have not time to explain and will be telegraphed you from Brownsville. ..... My report shows you my effective force which may be summed up in round numbers at two thousand. My position is a good one and if the men are steady and firm I can hold it against five thousand, but this is to test. You know the material as well as I do. I have sent Capt. Daniel with one of his pieces to Pyburns Bluff five miles by land below this supported by two companies cavalry to fire on the enemy's transports and harass him so as to detain him. I have the three heavy guns in battery half mile below depot on a Bluff from which a ridge makes out to the Prairie some two miles on the crest of the hill. I have an entrenchment running around the crest for a distance of four hundred yards. Hart's three small pieces on the left at angles to strengthen my left so as to leave me more men to use on my right in case they attempt to flank me....Capt. Daniels company is so prostrated by sickness he can only serve four of his pieces. Of course I shall use them at the points most needed...

One July 5, 1862, Harts battery was the subject of a series of telegraphs from General Hindman at Little Rock to Brigadier General Albert Rust at Des Arc. General Hindman wished General Rust to order Captain Hart to turn over four guns to a Texas Officer, Captain Pratt at Des Arc. Captain Hart was then to "return to Devals Bluff and take charge of his old Battery with both his own and Browns men." Also on July 5, 1862, General Hindman telegraphed Col Nelson commanding Fort Hindman to consolidate Hart's and Brown's artillery companies ordered to Devalls Bluff by Rust.

On July 21, 1862, Special Orders Army of the South West #40, ordered a Major Rundell to "assume command of a battalion of artillery composed of Woodruff's battery, Pratt's battery Daniels' battery and Hart's battery..... and set up camp of instruction." On the same day, Col. Robert G. Shaver at Pine Bluff received a telegram from Robert C. Newton informing him. "I will send Hart's Battery to you tomorrow"

While Captain Hart and others had managed by July 1862 to clear their names of the censure from the Battle of Pea Ridge and begin the process or reorganization, other members of the battery were apparently condemned for desertion.

Headquarters Army of the South West

Little Rock Arks

Aug 1st 1862.

Circular. The misconduct of a comparatively small number of bad men is bringing all the troops into disrepute. Through mistaken feeling of Kindness, their offences have been again and again forgiven, or else but, lightly punished. - This course has increased, instead of lessening, the evil. A different one will henceforth be adhered to. - Discipline, of the strictest sort, will be enforced, at all hazards. - The severest penalties will be inflicted, without hesitation, upon offenders of all grades. Desertion, Mutiny, Disloyalty, and Plundering, or any attempt at either, or manifestation or expression of any such intention, will be punished with death. Two men of Morgans Regiment of Arkansas Infantry [26th Arkansas Infantry] and two men of [William] Harts battery have suffered death today. - Their names were Amsick McCance and Michael Donahoo of Morgan's Battalion and Thomas J and John Welch of Harts battery. - Their crime was desertion. Let this example be remembered. Good men have nothing to fear, Bad men must reform, or share the fate of these deserters.

By order of Maj Gen [Thomas C.] Hindman R.

[Robert] C. Newton Chief of Staff

With the censure lifted, at least officially, Hart's Battery was reconstituted on August 1, 1862, at Camp White Sulphur Springs, Arkansas. Few of the members of the original Dallas Artillery rejoined the second organization. The battery was augmented with a large number of unassigned recruits from depots at Monticello and Little Rock, and transfers from several Arkansas regiments, especially the 24th Arkansas Infantry. On August 2, 1862, the organization of the new Confederate forces organizing at Camp White Sulphur was announced in Special Orders No. 54, Head Quarters Army of the South West, Little Rock Arks:

IX. The following arrangement of the troops at Camp White Sulphur is announced:

First Brigade Col Robert G. Shaver Comd'g

1 Charles L. Dawsons' Regiment Arkansas Infantry
2 Hiram S. Grinsteads Regiment Arkansas Infantry
3 Portlock's Arkansas Infantry
Hart's Battery

In Special Orders, Army of the South West, No. 56, dated August 4, 1862, Capt William Hart, commanding battery, was ordered to "proceed at once to Pine Bluff, with his company and report to Brig Genl. Roane for duty. Genl Roane will detail the necessary number of men to fill Capt Hart's battery to One Hundred and twenty men."

Hart's battery became involved in the Confederate efforts to counter a Union push toward Little Rock when on August 7, 1862, Major General Hindman wired Brigadier General John S. Roane:.

I send you herewith a dispatch of today from Capt Brandenburg to Col [Benjamin F.] Danley. The force and object of the enemy must be ascertained as soon as possible, and the valley of the Arkansas protected, if it can be done. Send out as strong a cavalry detachment as possible you can immediately. - order Maj. Johnson and Lt. Col. Gidding's command to this side of the White river, and use them between the two rivers. - Take command of the troops and battery of Genl. [Mosby] Parsons, of Missouri, and let them take position at or near Red Fork, or lower down, if safe. - Hart battery left for Pine Bluff yesterday morning, and ought to reach you tomorrow, a heavy gun, to be mounted at shore, at Pine Bluff, left on Key West today.

=== Arkansas Post ===
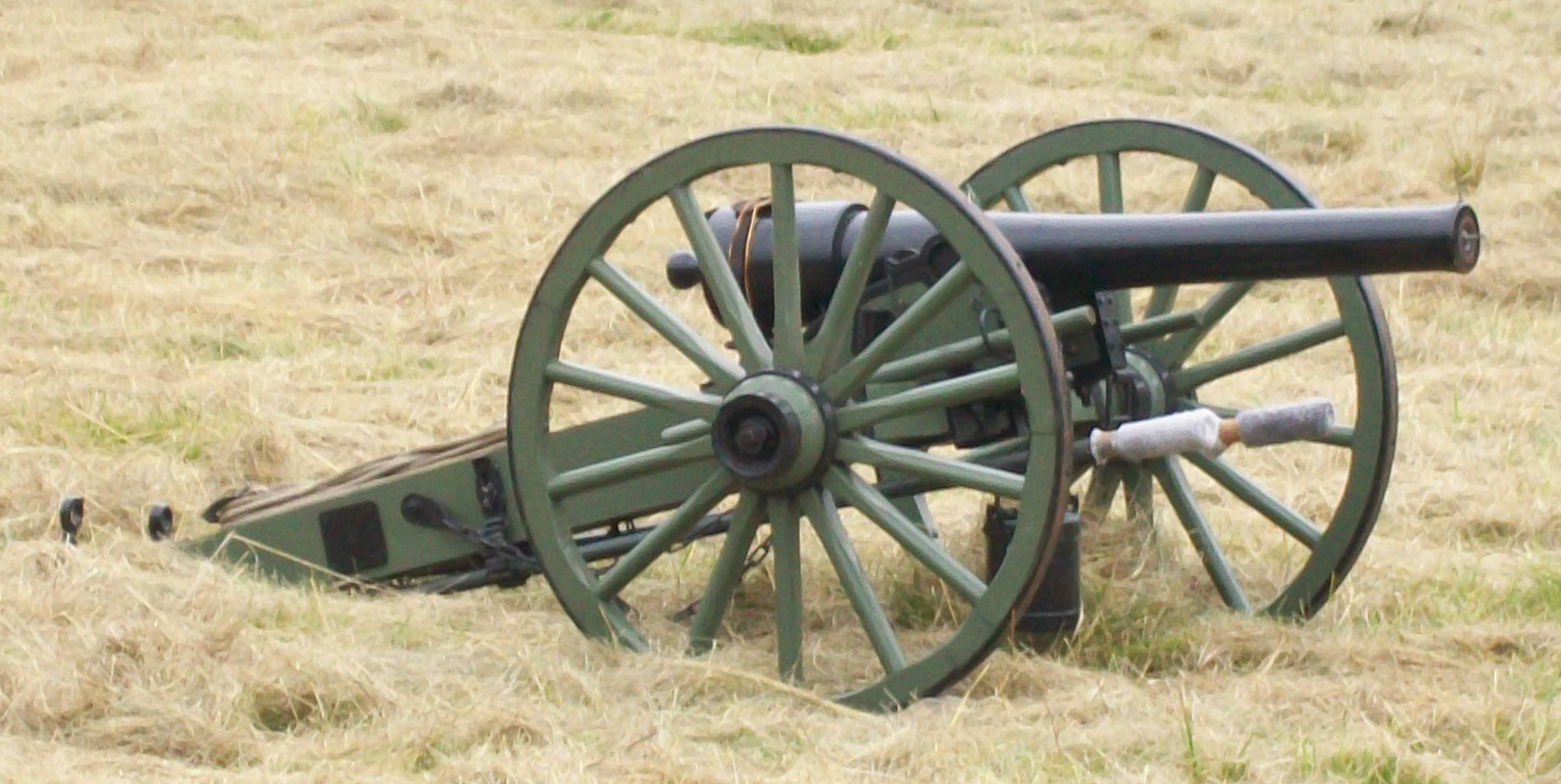
10 lb Parrott Rifle

By September 28, 1862, the battery was assigned to Colonel Robert R. Garland's brigade of Texas troops. Colonel Garland's Texas Brigade, with Hart's Battery was stationed at Fort Hindman, an earthwork which controlled the mouth of the Arkansas River, near Arkansas Post in Arkansas County. The Confederate forces at Arkansas Post consisted of the Second Division, Second Corps, Trans-Mississippi Department, commanded by Brig. Gen. Thomas J. Churchill. He styled his command the "Army of Lower Arkansas and White Rivers". At this time Harts battery consisted of four, 10 pounder Parrott rifle guns and two, 6 pounder guns. In December 1862, in accordance with orders issued by General Churchill, Captain Hart sent Lieutenant William Tiller with one section of rifled guns to harass Union shipping on the Mississippi. Lieutenant Tiller and his section, probably supported by Cavalry, intercepted the Union Transport "Blue Wing" at Cypress Ben, eight miles below the town of Napoleon, Arkansas and forced her to surrender. The transport, which had a cargo of ammunition, was towing two coal barges. The "Blue Wing" was forced to sail up the Arkansas to Arkansas Post.

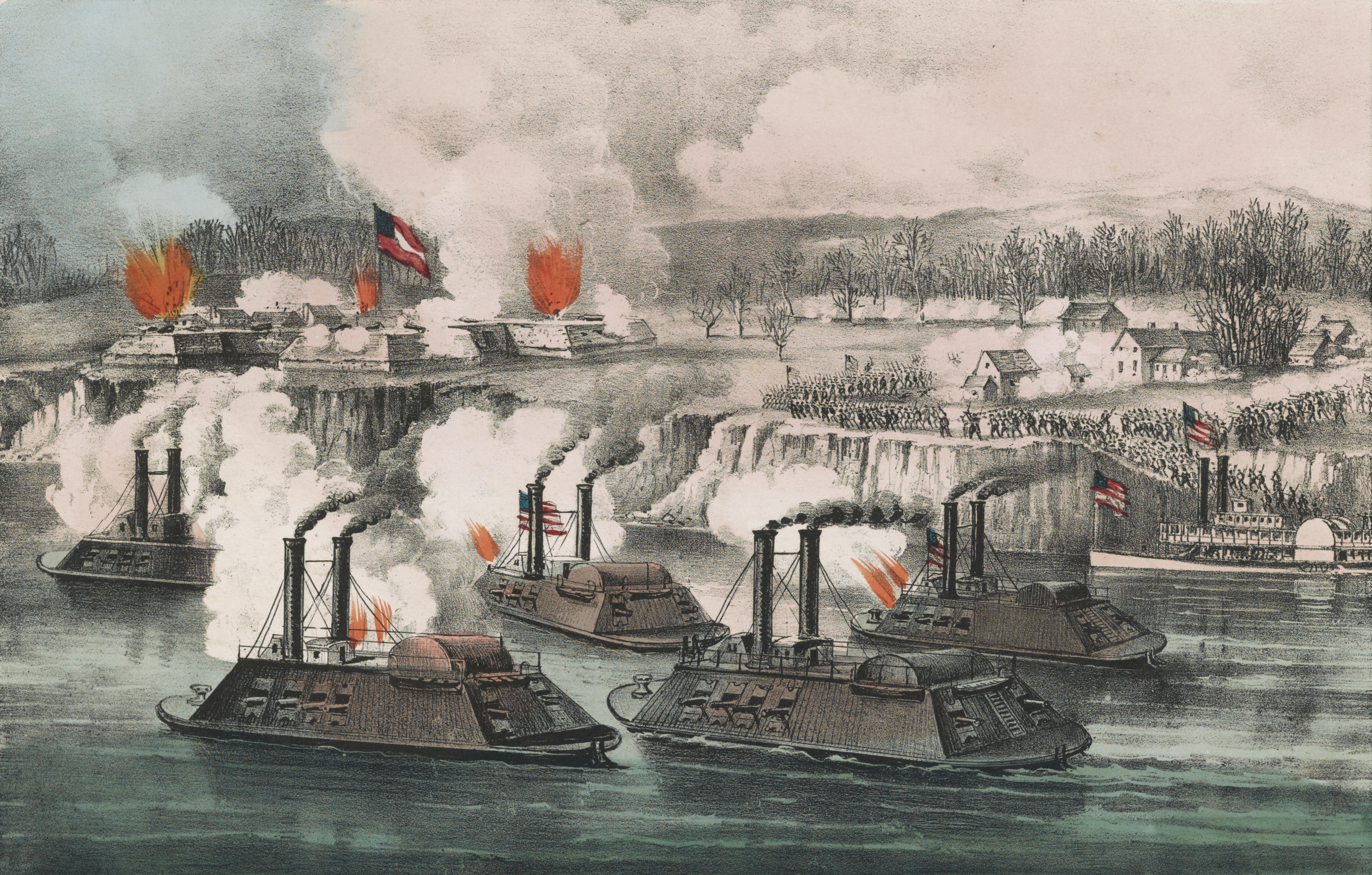
Bombardment and capture of Fort Hindman, Arkansas Post, Ark. January 11, 1863.

General Churchill's command of approximately 5500 Confederates found themselves facing a Union Army under Union Maj. Gen. John A. McClernand totaling over 33,000 along with a Naval Taskforce under the command of Admiral David D. Porter. On the morning of January 11 McClernand's forces were deployed in an arc facing Fort Hindman and its rifle-pits. Churchill's defenses were manned by Colonel James Deshler's brigade on the left and Colonel Robert Garland's brigade on the right. One section of 6 pound guns from Hart's Battery, under the command of Lieutenant E.A. DuBose was stationed, on the right flank of the 10th Texas Cavalry (dismounted). McClernand's infantry attacked around 1:00pm and made little progress at first. At the same time Porter's gunboats moved in to attack aided by Colonel Lindsey's brigade across the river. Within an hour the fort's east face was reduced to rubble and its artillery silenced. Captain Hart's battery, owing to its initial effectiveness in creating casualties and stopping repeated Union assaults, was singled out for special attention from Union fire, including sharpshooters. Colonel James Desher observed that the fire was so hot that it became impossible for any of Hart's men to show themselves without being struck. At 4:30pm McClernand was planning to order one massive assault against the defenders when white flags of surrender began to appear. The battle ended with some confusion. Porter's gunboats picked up infantry from Lindsey's brigade and ferried them across the river who climbed into the crumbling remains of Fort Hindman. General Steele entered the rifle-pits under a flag of truce to discuss surrender with Colonel Deshler. As the two conferred, Deshler noticed Steele's men continually moving closer and demanded they be ordered to stop or he'd open fire again. General Sherman arrived on the scene to personally seek out Churchill. However, Sherman stood by as Churchill and Colonel Garland became involved in an argument over surrendering. Garland claimed he had been ordered to surrender while Churchill denied giving such an order. Colonel Deshler rode up from his front and declared to the group he had not surrendered at all and insisted on renewing the fight. Sherman ended the argument by pointing out the Union forces had all but occupied the Confederate's works. Some Union soldiers had even began disarming the Confederates. From all accounts, Hart's Battery served their guns professionally and courageously during the siege. Col. Robert R. Garland's report stated:

Sunday, the 11th, about sunrise, Dawson's regiment with four pieces of Hart's battery were ordered from my right to the left of the line. I directed Lieutenant-Colonel Anderson to cover the interval thus made, by taking ground to the right with his regiment by extending intervals, which consequently rendered this part of the line rather scattering. About noon the gunboats again opened fire on the fort, gradually ap preaching. Within three-quarters of an hour after this the enemy's batteries and sharpshooters opened a brisk fire on our entire line. Lieutenant McIntosh, in charge of a section of Hart's battery, commenced firing as soon as he could do so with effect, and on several occasions drove the enemy's sharpshooters from under cover of some buildings several hundred yards in front of his position, as well as otherwise generally annoying the enemy until all his ammunition was blown up by a shell from one of the enemy's batteries in front.

Another Texas commander describing the service of Hart's Battery at Arkansas Post stated:

Their [Union] attack by land was less successful; on the right they were repulsed twice in attempting to storm our works, and on the left were driven back with great slaughter in no less than eight different charges. To defend this entire line of rifle pits I had but one battery of small field pieces, under the command of Captain Hart, to whom great credit is due for the successful manner in which they were handled, contending as he did, with some fifty pieces in his front.

All but two of the 83 horses assigned to Hart's battery were killed and one of his guns was disabled. The battery with 83 officers and men and six guns was captured with the rest of the garrison when Confederate forces surrendered on January 11, 1863. The battery suffered three killed, thirteen wounded and twenty two missing during the Battle of Arkansas Post.

=== Prisoners of war ===
Captain Hart and other members of the battery were taken as prisoners of war via steamship first to St. Louis, Missouri, a few of the sick and wounded were left there at the Gratiot Street Military Prison. The enlisted prisoners were moved via rail to Camp Butler, at Springfield Illinois. Upon arriving at Camp Butler, the prisoners were divided into companies of 80 to 120 men each for housing. The enlisted men of Hart's Battery were assigned quarters with Captain Dennison's and Captain Nutt's Louisiana Cavalry companies and the "W. P. Lane Rangers of Texas. Many prisoners died in prison camp, a few others took the oath of allegiance to the Union and were released, most simply waited to be exchanged. The officers were moved to Camp Chase, Ohio, arrived there on Jan 29, 1863. Lieutenant William T. Tiller had managed to escape from the transports at Memphis Tennessee on the trip north.

At this point in the war, regular exchanges of Union and Confederate prisoners of war had been occurring at Vicksburg, Mississippi, with the Union transporting POWs to Vicksburg under a cartel for release. By the spring of 1863, when the Arkansas and Texas prisoners from Arkansas Post were due to be exchanged, General U.S. Grant wanted to avoid these exchanged prisoners becoming additional replacements for the garrison at Vicksburg, which was the object of his operations at that time. Grant arranged for the Arkansas Post prisoners to be exchanged at City Point Virginia instead of Vicksburg. Approximately 2500 prisoners from Arkansas Post were released at City Point, Virginia, on April 10, 1862, but many were sick and not available for duty. Additionally, the officers were not released at the same time that the enlisted men were released, which left the units leaderless. The Officer POWs were moved next to Camp Delaware, Delaware, on April 25, 1863, and were forwarded for exchange April 29, 1863. They were received at City Point Virginia, May 4, 1863, The Confederate government considered several factors in determining where the newly released prisoners would be sent. The call for more troops had become universal from every theater of war by now. Considerable discussions were underway with Lee and the War Department regarding the necessity to reinforce Bragg's army in Tennessee or the garrison at Vicksburg, on the Mississippi. Subsequently, General Bragg was ordered to detach troops from his army to reinforce the Vicksburg garrison.

=== On to Richmond! ===
On April 15, 1863, Gen Cooper wrote to Gen French, commanding at Petersburg, where the Arkansas Post prisoners were being housed, "It is impossible to send officers from here to take charge of prisoners to go West. I will let you know tomorrow what disposition is to be made of the Arkansas prisoners." On April 30, 1863, the following messages was sent to Capt D Meyers AAG Petersburg, ".... In respect to the 2500 exchanged prisoners at Model Farm Barracks [Petersburg] reported by you it is desirable that those captured at Ark Post should be immediately organized into their original Co's and the NCO's assigned to their respective Co's. Where there are insufficient NCOs for the several Co's, corporals may be advanced to lance Sgts and the most efficient privates to lance corporals. You will please have the organizations completed w/the least possible delay so that he command may be brought into some sort of discipline and an officer of ... placed in command"

The Chancellorsville campaign (April 30 to May 6, 1863) created some emergencies in and around Richmond. With very few troops available to counter a raid on the capital by Union Major General George Stoneman's 10,000-strong cavalry force, the Confederate War Department called on the returned Arkansas Post prisoners, then being housed in Petersburg awaiting the release of their officers, to help defend the capitol. On May 1, 1863, "at 3 o'clock in the morning we are ordered to fall-in, are marched to the armory and every able man was issued full equipage for the field...." That evening, the Arkansas Post prisoners were marched from "Moddle Farm" into the northern suburbs of Richmond and to man the fortifications of the city's defensive works.

By May 5, 1863, the officers of the Arkansas units had apparently been received. "Richmond AG to Capt Chas D Meyers AAG Petersburg-Send here the exchanged officers referred to in Petersburg Dispatch, especially those belonging to the Texas troops sent here yesterday." On that afternoon, an ad hoc battalion composed of the released prisoners of the 19th and 24th Arkansas Infantry Regiments, along with several Texas Cavaly companies and the remnants of Hart's Arkansas Battery, were sent outside of Richmond on the Chancellorsville Road to protect against another possible raid by Union Forces. That same day Confederate Secretary of War Seddon directed Confederate General Joe Johnston to "Proceed at once to Ms and take chief command of the force's, as far as practical---Arrange to take with you -- 3000 good troops, who will be substituted in Gen Bragg's army by a large number of prisoners recently returned from Arkansas Post, captured and reorganized, now on their way to Gen Pemberton. Stop them at the point most convenient to Gen Bragg." On May 6, 1863, the Texas Troops from Arkansas Post, along with Hart's Battery were allowed to make their quarters in the Confederate Capitol building in Richmond. The consolidated 19th/24th Arkansas and Harts battery left Richmond, on May 11, 1863, ordered to report to the Army of the Tennessee at Tullahoma, Tennessee. The Arkansas Post units were consolidated after they reported for duty with Bragg's army at Tullahoma Tennessee. Exactly how the surviving enlisted personnel from Hart's second battery were utilized during the Chickamauga and Chattanooga campaigns is unclear as the Compiled Service Records for most members of the unit end with the prisoners being exchanged at City Point Virginia. One member of the Battery, Private S. B. Wilson was captured on September 11, 1863, at Chattanooga Tenn. The consolidated 19th/24th Arkansas Infantry Regiment participated in the Battle of Chickamauga, September 19–20, 1863 in northern Georgia as part of Dresher's Brigade, which was composed of the Released Arkansas Post prisoners.

On March 21, 1864, Brigadier General W.N. Pendleton provided a report of his inspection of the various artillery battalions belonging to the Army of Tennessee. Attachment No. 4 to that inspection report was the statistical report of the battalion of artillery, of Hood's Corps, commanded by Captain Robert Cobb. Captain Cobb's report has includes a footnote that referrers to the disposition of Hart's Arkansas Battery.

a. The following batteries have been consolidated into one, with such of their equipments as was required to make the battery effective: Byrne's [Mississippi] Battery at Corinth, May 1862: Graves [Mississippi] battery, at Murfreesborough,[sic] November, 1862: fragments of Green's [Kentucky] battery, Hart's [Arkansas] battery, and Water' [Alabama] battery in January 1864.

Cobb's Kentucky Battery would serve during the Atlanta Campaign. The Battery was surrendered by Lieutenant General Richard Taylor, Commanding the Department of Alabama, Mississippi, and East Louisiana, at Citronelle, Alabama, on May 4, 1865.

=== Third organization ===
The consolidation of Arkansas Post units when they reached the Army of Tennessee at Tullahoma Tennessee created supernumerary (excess officers without official assignment) officers who returned to the Department of the Trans-Mississippi. It seems that Captain Hart fell into this category and this explains his eventual return to the Department of the Trans-Mississippi. After being exchanged in May 1863, Hart likely moved from Virginia to Tullahoma with the remnants of the battery and then made his way back across country and across the Mississippi River to rejoin confederate forces in the Department of the Trans-Mississippi.

Exactly when the third organization of Hart's battery occurred is unclear. There are few references to Hart's Battery during the last year of the war and there are no surviving muster rolls from the third organization. On February 25, 1864, Hart and another former battery officer, Lieutenant William T. Tiller were in Houston Texas. Lieutenant Tiller had made application to become a Cadet, (a type of officer in training) in the Confederate Army, and Captain Hart provided a letter of recommendation. This may indicated that Lieutenant Tiller and Captain Hart were still considered supernumary (excess) officers. Lieutenant Tiller eventually joined Captain O. G. Jones Company of Texas Light Artillery as a second lieutenant.

The first mention of the third organization of Hart's Battery is in General E. Kirby Smith's September 30, 1864, report on the organization of the Army of the Trans-Mississippi Department. Hart's Battery is listed as belonging to the Siege Train. On November 19, 1864, General E. Kirby Smith, commanding the Confederate Trans-Mississippi Department, issued Special Orders No. 290, re-organizing the artillery of the department and for the first time providing numerical designations to the batteries and battalions. In this reorganization, Hart's Battery, armed with four mounted guns, and commanded by Capt. William Hart was re-designated as the 2nd Arkansas Field Battery and assigned to the Reserve Battalion.

On April 1, 1865, General Orders No. 31, Headquarters, Trans-Miss Department, was published at Shreveport, LA, which listed the conviction of Private John T. Sharman, and Private E. W. Glenn, of Knowing of an intended Mutiny and not giving Information thereof to the Commanding Officer. The two were sentenced to bread and water, wearing a twenty-four pound ball and chain and hard labor.

== Surrender ==
At the end of the war the battery was with the Reserve Battalion at Marshall, Texas, and Captain William Hart was still in command. The battery surrendered with General E. Kirby Smith on May 26, 1865. The date of the military convention between Confederate General Edmund Kirby Smith and Union General Edward Canby for the surrender of the troops and public property in the Trans-Mississippi Department was May 26, 1865; however, it took a while for parole commissioners to be appointed and for public property to be accounted for. As a result, a final report of field artillery which was part of the accounting process, was not completed until June 1, 1865. According to the final accounting, at the time of the surrender, the battery was with Reserve Battalion at Marshall, Texas, but had no guns. Captain Hart was paroled at Millican, Texas, on July 3, 1865. Lieutenant Edwin A. Dubose was paroled at Shreveport Louisiana on June 21, 1865.

== Flag ==
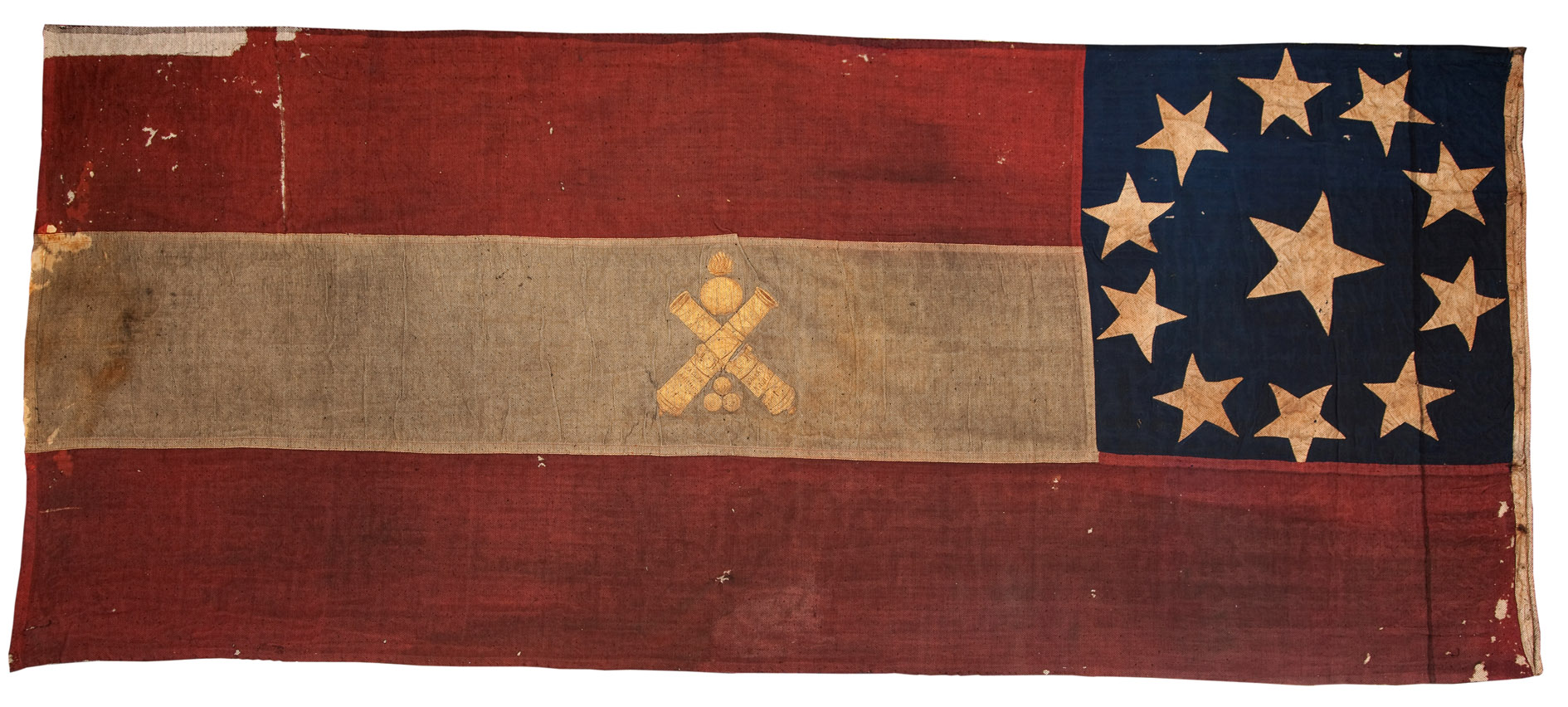
Confederate 1st National Flag of the "Dallas Artillery"

The Old State House Museum in Little Rock Arkansas has in its collection of Civil War battle flags a Confederate First National pattern flag which has traditionally been ascribed to "Hart's Battery," also known as the "Dallas Artillery". The flag was recovered on the field of Pea Ridge where Hart's battery lost its guns. While both Confederate and Union after action reports mention the loss of the unit's guns, only the Union reports mention the capture of the battery's flag. In recent years, some question has arisen regarding the association of this flag with Hart's Battery. It appears that there may have been two batteries on the field of Pea Ridge that were designated the "Dallas Artillery".

Good's Texas Battery or the 1st Texas Light Artillery was formed of 50 men from Tyler, Texas, under newspaperman James P. Douglas and 50 men from Dallas under Judge John J. Good, who became Captain and unit commander. They were issued field pieces from the Texas state arsenal in Austin and went into then Indian Territory and later Arkansas. Good's Battery became part of the army under Earl Van Dorn that fought at Pea Ridge. Good's Battery had been presented with a flag by "the ladies of Dallas" when the battery originally went off in 1861. In a letter to his wife dated Mar. 23, 1862, Capt. Good stated:.

P.S. In consequence of neglect or carelessness the beautiful flag presented us by the ladies of Dallas was left on the field on Saturday morning of the fight ( at Pea Ridge/Elkhorn Tavern, Mar. 8, 1862 ) and fell into the hands of the enemy. Our guns, in consequence of sickness and discharges, had to be worked with greatly diminished numbers. The wounded had to be carried from the field by our own men. As soon as ammunition was expended we limbered to the rear. The flag had not been unfurled but laid on the ground. It was forgotten.

In a footnote Judge Fitzhugh described the battery's replacement by Hart's Arkansas Battery which was subsequently overrun by the Union 12th Missouri Inf., members of which also recovered the "forgotten" flag of the Dallas Artillery, thereby setting in train a host of complications. Of course, the Missourians thought the cannon they'd captured went along with the flag, and compounded the error when they announced they had "captured" the Dallas Artillery! As Judge Fitzhugh continues:

Compilers of the Official Records, aware that it was Hart's Arkansas Battery which lost its guns but puzzled, apparently, by the flag, jumped to the conclusion that "Dallas Battery" was Hart's Arkansas Artillery Battery and so cross-indexed it in their records...probably led astray, or confirmed in their own mistake, by the same error made by former Confederate General Marcus J. Wright...".

Glenn Dedmondt in his work, "Flags of Civil War Arkansas", accepts the flag as that of Hart's Battery.

== See also ==
- List of Confederate units from Arkansas
- Confederate Units by State
