= 112th United States Colored Infantry Regiment =

112th U.S. Colored Infantry
- Flag of the United States, 1863-1865
- Active: August 11, 1864, to September 15, 1866
- Country: United States
- Allegiance: Union
- Branch: Infantry
- Size: Regiment
- Nickname: 5th Regiment Arkansas Volunteer Infantry (African Descent)
- Engagements: American Civil War

Commanders
- Commander: Lt. Col. John G. Gustafson

The 112th United States Colored Infantry was an infantry regiment that served in the Union Army during the American Civil War. The regiment was composed of African American enlisted men commanded by white officers and was authorized by the Bureau of Colored Troops which was created by the United States War Department on May 22, 1863.

== Organization ==
The regiment was organized at Little Rock, Arkansas, April 23 to November 8, 1864, as the 5th Regiment Arkansas Volunteer Infantry (African Descent) and assigned to the VII Corps (Union Army). The unit was later re-designated as the 112th United States Colored Infantry.

== Service ==
The regiment was attached to 1st Division, 7th Corps, Dept. of Arkansas, June, 1864, to January, 1865. Colored Brigade, 7th Corps, to February, 1865.

General Orders No. 14 Department of Arkansas, dated February 1, 1865, from Little Rock, included the 112th United States Colored Infantry is reported as belonging to the 2nd Brigade of the 1st Division of the 7th Army Corps.

The regiment was attached to 2nd Brigade, 1st Division, 7th Corps, to April, 1865. The regiment was assigned to post and garrison duty at Little Rock, Ark., entire term.

== Consolidated ==
The regiment was consolidated with the 11th U.S. Colored Infantry (Old) and the 113th U.S. Colored Infantry (old) the 113th United States Colored Troops (New) on April 1, 1865. The resulted regiment was mustered out on April 9, 1866.

== See also ==
- List of Arkansas Civil War Union units
- List of United States Colored Troops Civil War Units
- United States Colored Troops
- Arkansas in the American Civil War
