= 57th United States Colored Infantry Regiment =

- Active: to
- Country: United States
- Allegiance: Union
- Branch: Infantry
- Size: Regiment
- Nickname: 4th Regiment Arkansas Volunteer Infantry (African Descent)
- Engagements: American Civil War

Commanders
- Commander: Col. Thomas D. Seawell

The 57th United States Colored Infantry was an infantry regiment that served in the Union Army during the American Civil War. The regiment was composed of African American enlisted men commanded by white officers and was authorized by the Bureau of Colored Troops which was created by the United States War Department on May 22, 1863.

== Organization ==
The regiment was organized at Devall's Bluff, Little Rock and Helena, Ark., on December 2, 1863, as the 4th Regiment Arkansas Volunteer Infantry (African Descent). The designation of regiment was changed to 57th U.S. Colored Troops March 11, 1864.

== Service ==
The regiment was attached to the District of Eastern Arkansas, 7th Corps, Dept. of Arkansas, to May, 1864, the 1st Brigade, 2nd Division, 7th Corps, to January, 1865, the Colored Brigade, 7th Corps, to February, 1865, the 2nd Brigade, 1st Division, 7th Corps, to August, 1865, and the Dept. of Arkansas to December, 1866.

The regiment was assigned garrison duty at Helena and Little Rock, Ark., till August, 1864. A detachment of the regiment participated in Steele's Camden Expedition, March 23-May 3, 1864, as bridge train guard. The regiment was involved in a skirmish near Little Rock on April 26, 1864, and conducted operations against Confederate General Joe Shelby north of Arkansas River May 13–31, 1864. The regiment was involved in skirmishes near Little Rock on May 24 and 28, 1864. The regiment marched to Brownsville, Ark., on August 23, 1864, and then moved to Duvall's Bluff on August 29, 1864. The regiment was on duty there and at Little Rock until June, 1865.

Special Orders No. 28, Department of Arkansas, dated January 31, 1865, from Little Rock, instructed the 57th United States Colored Infantry to report to the commanding officer at Little Rock, Arkansas, for duty. General Orders No. 14 Department of Arkansas, dated February 1, 1865, from Little Rock, included the 57th United States Colored Infantry is reported as belonging to the 2nd Brigade of the 1st Division of the 7th Army Corps. On April 21, 1865, the 57th U.S.C.T. was assigned to the forts defending Little Rock, Ar.

When the Confederate Army of the Trans-Mississippi surrendered on May 26, 1865, the unit was divided between Little Rock and Duvall's Bluff. The unit was transferred to Ft. Smith, where they spent the months immediately following the war as guard and provost martial of the city.

== Mustered out of service ==
The 57th US Colored Troops remained on duty at Fort Smith till December 1866. Companies "A" and "D" mustered out October 18–19, 1866. The remainder of the regiment mustered out December 31, 1866.

== See also ==
- List of Arkansas Civil War Union units
- List of United States Colored Troops Civil War Units
- United States Colored Troops
- Arkansas in the American Civil War
