= Massacre Canyon =

- Massacre Canyon Battlefield
- U.S. National Register of Historic Places
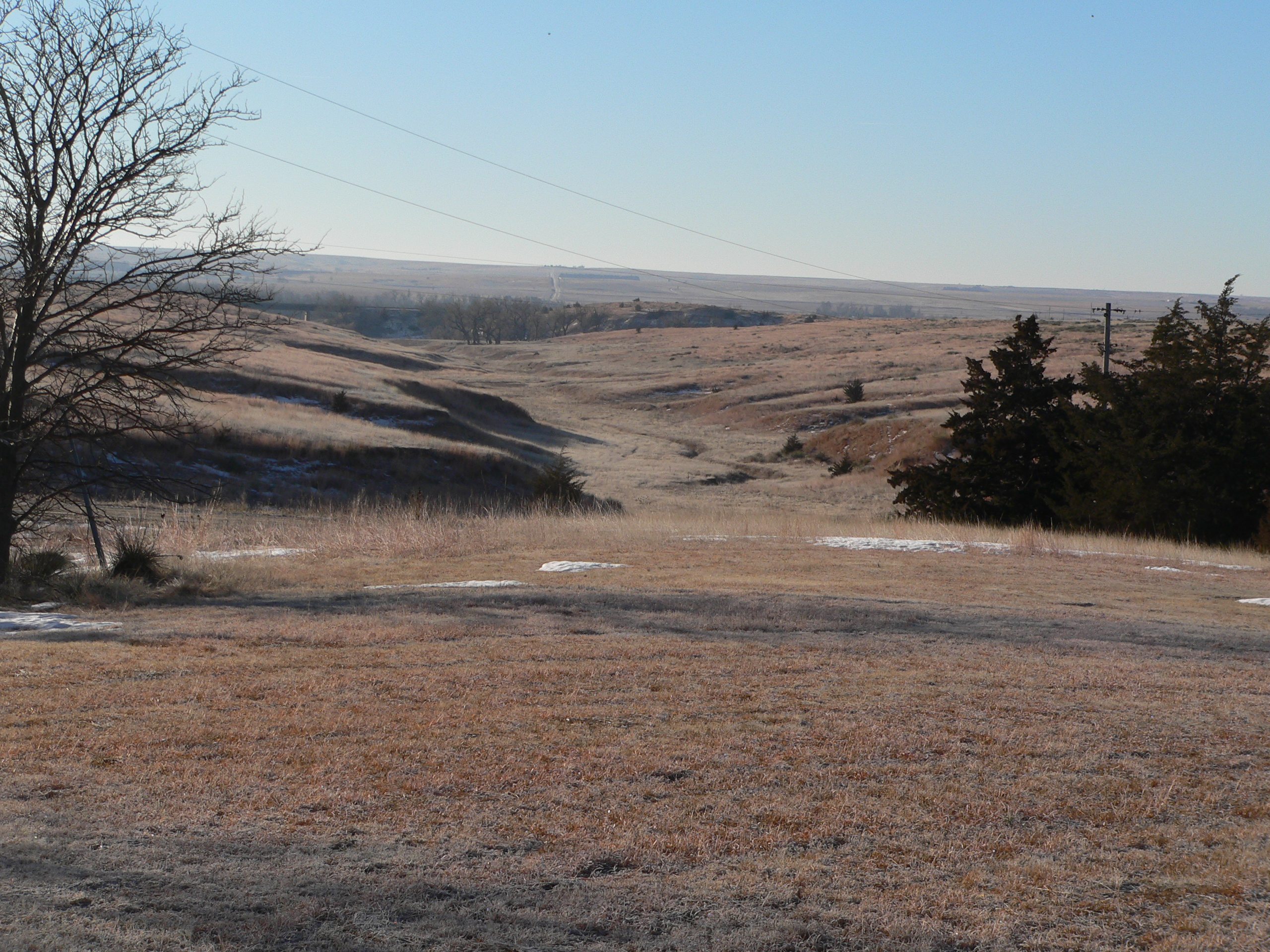
- View looking southwest from the Massacre Canyon monument

- Location within Nebraska Location within the United States
- Nearest city: Trenton, Nebraska
- Coordinates: 40.206443°N 100.964598°W
- Area: 3,680 acres (1,490 ha)
- NRHP reference No.: 74001118
- Added to NRHP: July 25, 1974

Massacre Canyon Battle
Date	August 5, 1873
Location	Massacre Canyon, Hitchcock County, Nebraska
Result	Lakota victory

Belligerents
Brule Lakota Indians Oglala Lakota Indians	Pawnee Indians

Commanders and leaders
Little Wound, Two Strike	Sky Chief, Fighting Bear, Ruling His Son

Strength
Around 1,000 Lakotas	Around 400 all in all, children, women and men

Casualties and losses
Unknown, but few	Unknown, but likely between 156 and 171, mostly women and children

The Massacre Canyon battle took place in Nebraska on August 5, 1873, near the Republican River. It was one of the last hostilities between the Pawnee (Pawnee: Chaticks si Chaticks) and the Sioux (or Lakota) and the last battle/massacre between Great Plains Indians in North America. The massacre occurred when a large Sioux war party of over 1,500 Oglala, Brulé, and Sihasapa warriors, led by Two Strike, Little Wound, and Spotted Tail attacked a band of Pawnee during their summer buffalo hunt. In the ensuing rout, many Pawnees were killed with estimates of casualties ranging widely from around 50 to over 150. The victims, who were mostly women and children, suffered mutilation and sexual assault.

According to Indian agent John W. Williamson of the Genoa Agency on the Pawnee Reservation, who accompanied the Pawnee hunting party, "On the 2d [in fact the 3d] day of July, 1873, the Indians, to the number of 700, left Genoa for the hunting grounds. Of this number 350 were men, the balance women and children." Williamson stated that 156 Pawnee were killed though numbers vary by source. This massacre ranked among "the bloodiest attacks by the Sioux" in Pawnee history. Cruel and violent warfare like this had been practiced against the Pawnee by the Lakota Sioux for centuries since the mid-1700s and through the 1840s. Attacks increased further in the 1850s until 1875. The Pawnee villages and Quaker agency near Genoa were attacked by the Lakota months and years prior to the massacre without US Government protection that had been promised in the 1857 Treaty with the Pawnee.

The Pawnee were traveling along the west bank of the canyon, which runs south to the Republican River, when they were attacked. "A census taken at the Pawnee Agency in September, according [to] Agent Burgess..." (see "Massacre Canyon Monument" article in External Links section) found that "71 Pawnee warriors were killed, and 102 women and children killed", the victims brutally mutilated and scalped and others even set on fire" although Trail Agent John Williamson's account states 156 Pawnee died (page 388). This massacre is by some considered one of the factors that led to the Pawnees' decision to move to a reservation in Indian Territory in what is today Oklahoma, though not all sources agree on its impact in this way.

Principal chiefs at the battle were:

- Pawnee: Sky Chief, Sun Chief, Fighting Bear, Ruling His Son.
- Sioux: Spotted Tail (Brulé chief) (unclear), Little Wound (Oglala chief), Two Strike (Brulé chief). Chief Charging Bear (John Grass, Sihasapa).

Among the Pawnee dead were Sky Chief (Tirawahut Lesharo) who was surrounded and killed by the Sioux while skinning a buffalo, and the wife and four children of Traveling Bear, a former sergeant in the Pawnee Scouts who served under Maj. Frank North and was a Medal of Honor recipient.

== History ==
The Pawnee had a long tradition of living in present-day Nebraska. The Pawnee had been the most populous and perhaps the most powerful tribe in the Nebraska area, with a population of 10,000 to 12,000 around the year 1800. However, smallpox epidemics and increasing Sioux raids on villages beginning in the early 1800s and worsening in the 1830s left the Pawnee in a vulnerable position. In a 1833 treaty with the United States, the Pawnee ceded all of their land south of the Platte River, a vast territory between the Loup, Platte and Republican rivers in Nebraska and south into northern Kansas. According to the terms of the 1833 treaty, this land was to remain a "common hunting ground" for the Pawnee and other "friendly Indians," meaning that the Pawnee had non-exclusive treaty rights to hunt buffalo in their former territory. The Massacre Canyon battlefield near Republican River is located within this area. They had suffered continual attacks by the Sioux that increased violently in the early 1840s. Part of the terms of the 1833 treaty prevented the Pawnee from going to war with any neighboring tribes and required the Pawnee to defer to the United States government as the arbiter of disputes and negotiator between tribes, meaning that the Pawnee could not retaliate against the Sioux attacks on their villages without violating the treaty.

In a 1857 treaty, the Pawnee ceded all territory north of the Platte River except for a small reservation on old Pawnee land, present-day Nance County. As part of this treaty, the Pawnee were guaranteed protection by the United States military. No explicit mention is made of the "common hunting ground" established from previously-ceded Pawnee lands as established in the 1833 treaty.

In 1865, in part due to their long rivalry with the Sioux, 95 Pawnee men joined enlisted with the United States military for the Powder River War, a military campaign against the Sioux, Arapaho, and Cheyenne intended to intimidate the tribes. The Pawnee scouts also worked with the Union Pacific Railroad to protect railroad workers during the construction of the transcontinental railroad through Nebraska and Wyoming. These actions by the Pawnee scouts did not improve relations between the Pawnee and Sioux.

In 1868 the Sioux entered into a treaty with the United States and agreed to live in the Great Sioux Reservation in present-day South Dakota. By Article 11 they received a right to hunt along the Republican River, in the same area that the Pawnee retained non-exclusive hunting rights to, almost 200 miles south of their new reservation. While the 1833 treaty with the Pawnee does establish that the former Pawnee lands south of the Platte were intended to be shared with other "friendly Indians," the Pawnee were at war with the Sioux at the time of the signing in 1833 and the United States was at war with the Sioux until 1868, meaning that the granting of hunting rights on this land to the Sioux is of uncertain legality given the ambiguity of the phrase "friendly Indians."

Both the Pawnee and the Sioux complained regularly over attacks by the other tribe. Because both tribes had signed treaties explicitly giving power of mediation to the United States government, there was an attempted peace negotiation in 1871 with the United States as intermediary which ultimately failed.

In July 1873, a month before the massacre, the Oglala Sioux had been stopped from attacking the Utes in retaliation for stolen horses and the killing of a Sioux man by Antoine Janis, the sub-agent for the band.

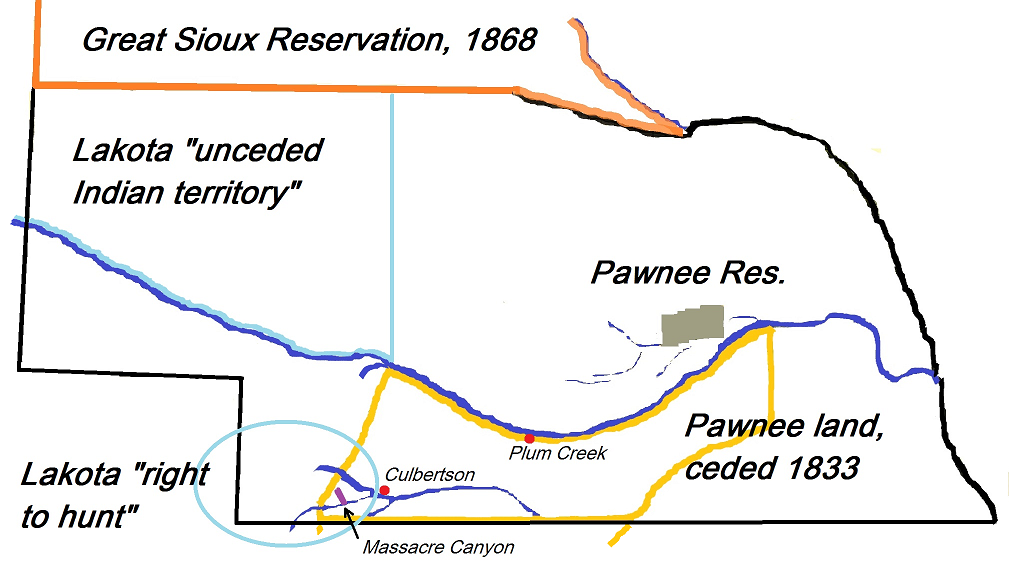
Map with Massacre Canyon battlefield (1873), Nebraska. Pawnee reservation and relevant Lakota territories.

== Lead-up to the battle ==
A Pawnee hunting group—roughly 400 men, women and children—were located in camp near present-day Trenton on August 4, 1873. Trail Agent John W. Williamson stayed in the camp with his visitor Lester Beach Platt.

Around the same time in early August, about 700 Brulé Sioux, led by Chief Two Strike, were hunting buffalo in the same area. The Oglala Sioux, led by chiefs Little Wound and Pawnee Killer, were hunting along tributaries of the Republican River west of the Pawnee camp.

Some Oglalas brought news of the big Pawnee camp on August 3. Chief Little Wound told Antoine Janis that he had stopped them from going against the Utes. Now, "the young men had determined to fight" the Pawnees, not to lose men and horses again. Janis replied that he could not prevent the Sioux from attacking the Pawnee but suggested that the two tribes meet to discuss the matter instead which was ignored. Later he told his sister, Susan Bordeaux Bettelyoun, that to restrain the warriors "... you might as well stop an avalanche."

All Sioux tipis in the area got the news. A boy eyewitness recalled many years later that "instantly all the warriors began to get ready to go on the warpath." In his understanding, the warriors were defending their hunting grounds. However, neither the Sioux nor the Pawnee had exclusive right to the hunting grounds. During the day around 1,000 warriors set off for the Pawnee to make a joint, quick attack and prevent the enemy from striking first.

== Trail Agent Williamson's account ==
John Williamson, aged 23, was assigned as the Pawnee trail-agent at the Genoa Agency on the Pawnee reservation. He accompanied the Pawnee on their August 1873 hunt. He wrote his recollections of the battle decades after the incident.

"On the fourth day of August we reached the north bank of the Republican River and went into camp. At 9 o'clock that evening, three white men came into camp and reported to me that a large band of Sioux warriors [was] camped 25 miles [40 km] northwest, waiting for an opportunity to attack the Pawnees for several days, anticipating that we would move up the river where buffaloes were feeding. Previous to this, white men visited us and warned us to be on our guard against Sioux attacks, and I was a trifle skeptical as to the truth of the story told by our white visitors. But one of the men, a young man about my age at the time, appeared to be so sincere in his efforts to impress upon me that the warning should be heeded, that I took him to Sky Chief who was in command that day, for a conference. Sky Chief said the men were liars; that they wanted to scare the Pawnees away from the hunting grounds so that white men could kill buffaloes for hides. He told me I was squaw and a coward. I took exception to his remarks, and retorted: 'I will go as far as you dare go. Don't forget that.' The following morning August 5, we broke camp and started north, up the divide between the Republican and the Frenchman Rivers. Soon after leaving camp, Sky Chief rode up to me and extending his hand said, 'Shake, brother.' He recalled our little unpleasantness the night previous and said he did not believe there was cause for alarm, and was so impressed with the belief that he had not taken the precaution to throw out scouts in the direction the Sioux were reported to be. A few minutes later a buffalo scout signaled that buffaloes had been sighted in the distance, and Sky Chief rode off to engage in the hunt. I never saw him again. He had killed a buffalo and was skinning it when the advance guard of the Sioux shot and wounded him. The Chief attempted to reach his horse, but before he was able to mount, several of the enemy surrounded him. He died fighting. A Pawnee, who was skinning a buffalo a short distance away but managed to escape, told me how Sky Chief died."

== The battle ==
The morning of August 5 the Pawnees went up a canyon. Men looking for game took the lead and the families followed with loaded down packhorses. A number of the Pawnee huntsmen in front seem to have been the first fatalities, lured into a Sioux trap by a decoy.

The Pawnee prepared for defense. Agent Williamson and either his friend Platt or tribal member Ralph Weeks rode out to arrange a peace council, but bullets forced them back.

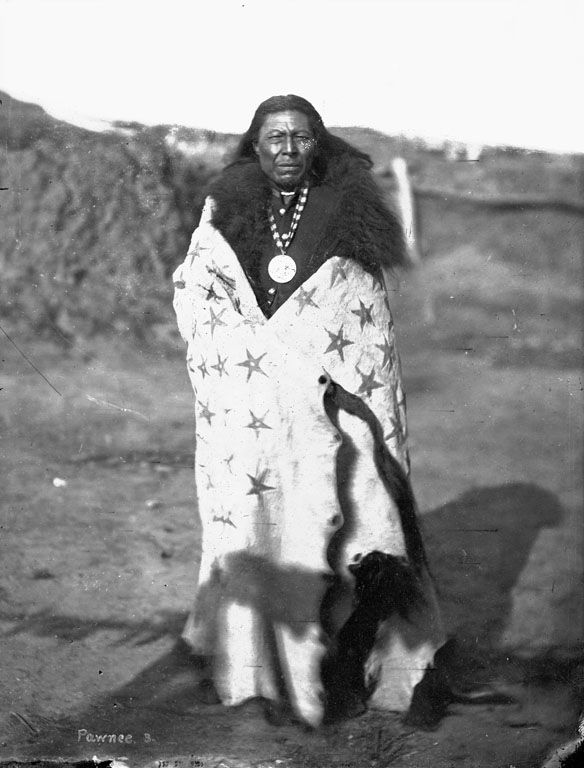
La-Roo-Chuck-A-La-Shar (Sun Chief) was a Pawnee chief who died fighting the Lakota at Massacre Canyon.

The Pawnees say that Sky Chief lived during the first part of the battle. He fought for his tribe, shouting words of encouragement to it. "Today I may see the tribe you protect here. This is the end. It is supposed to be better old men not to become. Now, men, a man be." He killed his own little son with his knife, telling the Sioux that they would not get his child.

Sky Chief covered the retreat of his people, and the Sioux encircled him. He was alone and on foot. Dog Chief, a younger brother of Sky Chief, rode through the Sioux line and told him to withdraw. Sky Chief refused to stop fighting while the enemies were killing Pawnee women and children. Knowing he himself would be killed, he took off his bear claw necklace, which was the symbol of his chieftainship. "Take the necklace and try to escape... I want you to have it and do not want the Sioux to gain possession of it." Dog Chief managed to bring the necklace to safety.

The Pawnee version of the Massacre Canyon battle tells of a few individuals' fate and relates some peculiar incidents.

The Sioux greatly outnumbered the Pawnee. Women threw hides, dried meat and saddles from the packhorses and the Pawnee started a disorganized retreat. "The withdrawal was a rout as the Sioux shot from both banks of the canyon into the fleeing Pawnee". In Culbertson, ten miles east of the battlefield, the residents heard the sound of gunfire.

Near the town of Culbertson, Capt. Charles Meinhold with his small command from Fort McPherson were camped. All through the morning Pawnee survivors found the camp as well as Williamson and Platt, who had made his escape early during the fight. The Pawnees got instructions to proceed further east.

== The next hours and days ==
The US cavalry soldiers rode up the canyon in the afternoon. "The first body we came upon was that of a woman", remembered Platt. Army Dr. David Franklin Powell described the march up the battleground: "We advanced from the mouth of the ravine to its head and found fifty-nine dead Pawnees ...". For one reason or another, a number of the dead women lay naked.

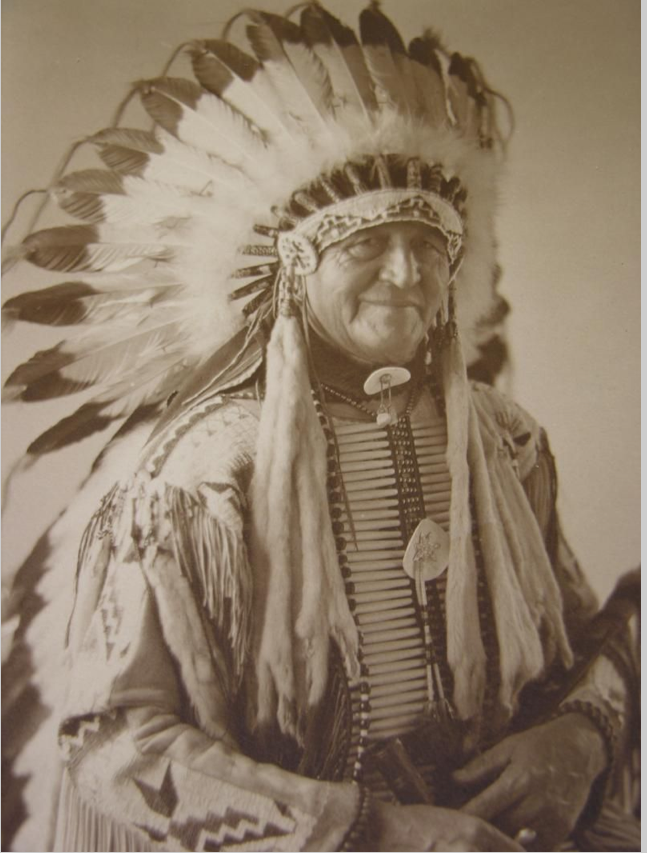
Chief Luther Standing Bear. As a boy he saw the victorious Lakota warriors return to the camp after the Massacre Canyon battle.

Sometime after the battle the Sioux warriors rode into camps. "One of the men in advance was waving a scalp. This caused great excitement. The men paraded around the village ... Everybody appeared to be happy and rejoicing". Later well-known Sioux Indian Luther Standing Bear got the impression that "about three hundred Pawnees were killed". Eastes reported that at least one Sioux was killed and others were badly wounded. The Cut-off Oglalas had suffered no casualties at all, according to their sub-agent. This is at odds with narratives of what happened in the canyon that day.

People from the nearest communities visited the scene of the battle over the following days. Royal Buck wrote to the readers of Nebraska City News that "It was a massacre and nothing more, and near 100 victims are lying on the ground and full two thirds are squaws and pappooses [small Indian children]".

News of the defeat reached the remaining Pawnees in the reservation on August 8 through a runner. "This produced intense excitement in the village, sorrowful wailings were heard all day".

The Pawnee survivors traveled 80 miles or so to Plum Creek near the Platte where Dr. William M. Bancroft treated the wounded. By train they arrived at Silver Creek, around ten miles south of the Pawnee Agency. The last tribal buffalo hunt of the Pawnee in Nebraska ended soon after.

== Afterwards ==
The last week of August, Williamson was back in Massacre Canyon. He covered the dead with dirt broken down from the banks. The number of Pawnee victims on the battlefield range from at least 50 to "156". A source often quoted is Agent William Burgess, who stated that "20 men, 39 women and 10 children" were killed.

Pawnees taken captive by the Sioux were released at the behest of the whites to rejoin their tribe.

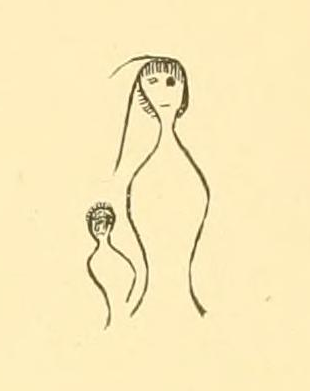
Cloud-Shield's Lakota Winter Count for the years 1873–74. Massacre Canyon battle, Nebraska. "They killed many Pawnees on the Republican River."

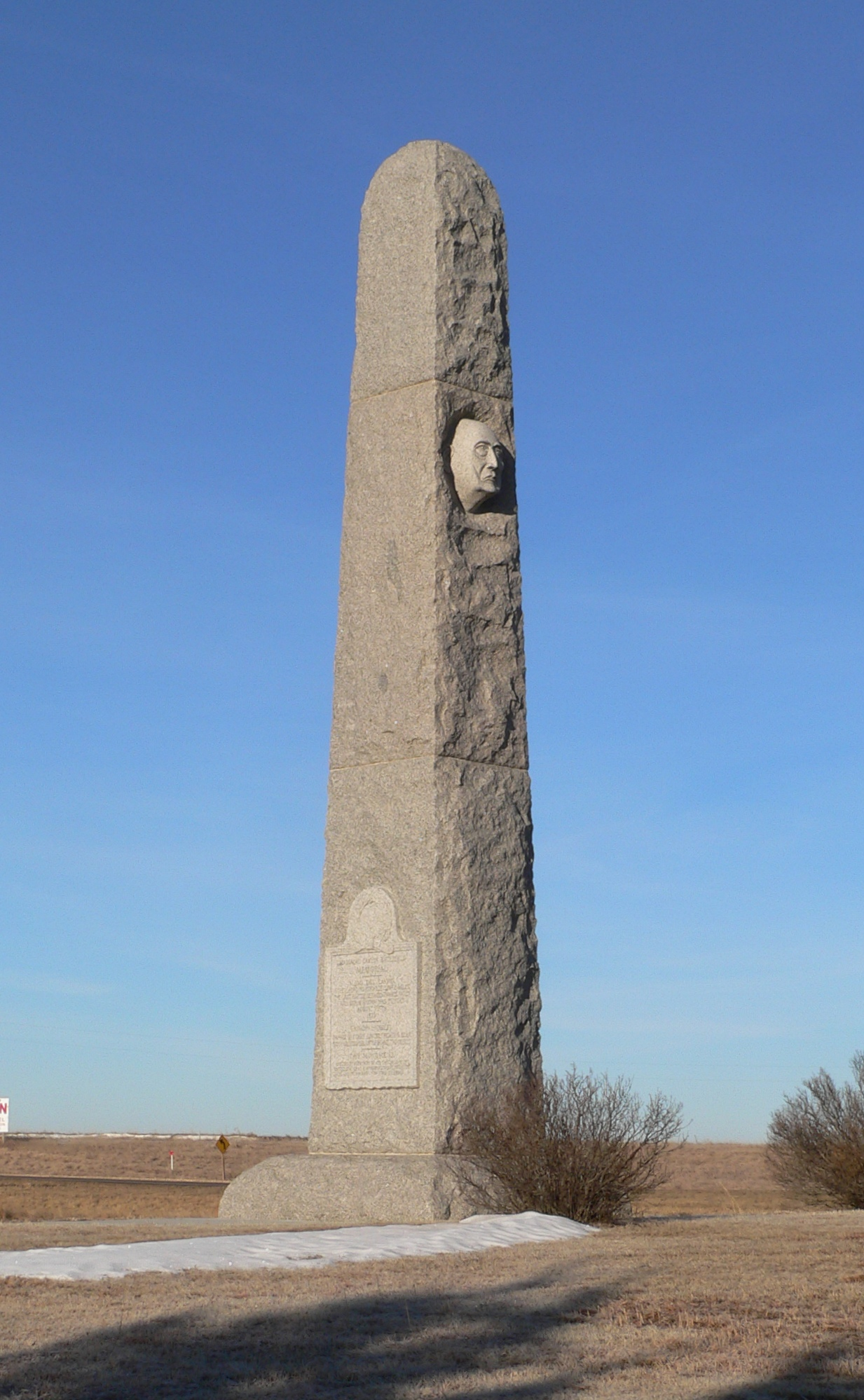
Massacre Canyon monument

Following the massacre, the Pawnee received $9,000 for the loss of more than 100 horses, 20 tons of dried meat and all sorts of equipment. The money came from the annuities of the Sioux, as stipulated in the 1868 Sioux Treaty, Article 1.

This incident, in particular, caused the government nationwide to intensify "its efforts to keep the Indians confined to their reservation" in an endeavor to curtail intertribal warfare. On a local level, Maj. Gen. George Crook "dispatched a small force" to protect the Pawnee Agency. The presence of troops did not stop the Sioux raids.

In the Lakota winter count of Cloud-Shield, the victory is remembered as the winter "they killed many Pawnees on the Republican river." The Pawnee Indians talk about "The hunters that were massacred".In the South Band Pawnee dialect, the area around Trenton is known as paareesuʾ ahrirakurahatka, "where the hunters were killed."

Dog Chief, being young, gave the bear claw necklace of his dead brother, Sky Chief, to the son of the Indian Agent Burgess for safekeeping. When some Pawnees tried to get it back, they failed. In 1920, Chawi Pawnee chief Lone Chief visited Burgess in Chicago and brought the necklace back.

It was half a century after the battle before the Pawnee and the Sioux smoked the pipe of peace during the Massacre Canyon Pow Wow in 1925.

== Monument ==
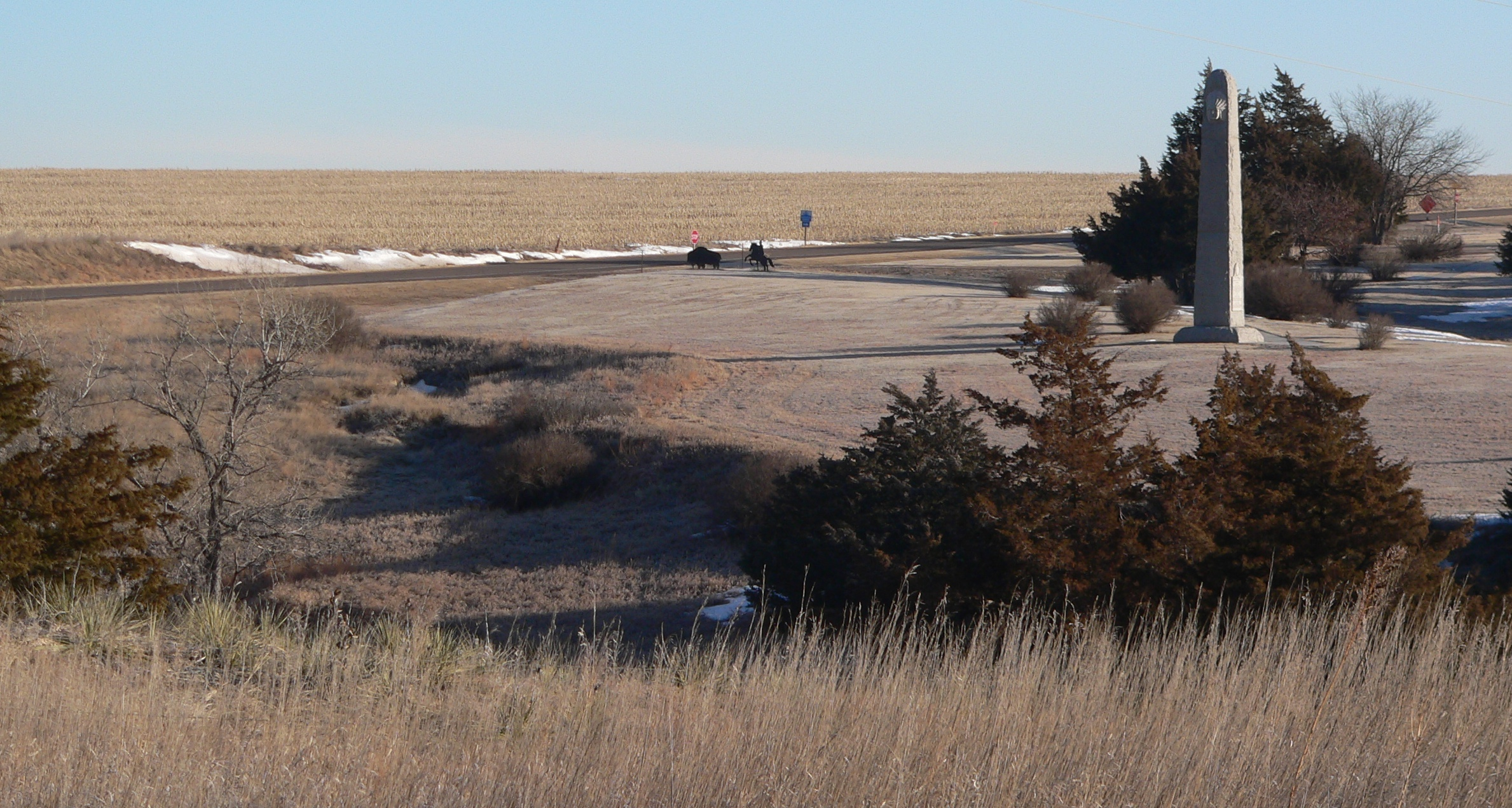
Massacre Canyon Monument.

The Massacre Canyon Monument was dedicated on Sept. 26, 1930. It was the first historical monument erected in Nebraska by federal grant. It stands on a three-acre (1.2 ha) plot, three miles (4.8 km) east of Trenton off U.S. Route 34, after having been moved from its original location overlooking the Republican River valley. The monument, a large stone obelisk, was constructed from Minnesota pink granite from a quarry in St. Cloud by R.P. Colling, Indianola, Nebraska. The shaft of the obelisk is 35 feet (11 m) high. The base measures 9 feet (2.7 m) by 9.5 feet (2.9 m) across; the bottom of the shaft is five feet (1.5 m) across, tapering to 32 inches (81 cm) near the top. The entire monument weighs 91 tons (83,000 kg).

The monument features a marker which reads:

"The adjacent stone monument erected in 1930 was first placed about a mile south of this area. Originally on the highway overlooking the canyon, it was moved to this location after the highway was relocated.

Massacre Canyon is the large canyon about half a mile west of here. The battle took place in and along this canyon when a Pawnee hunting party of about 700, confident of protection from the government, were surprised by a War Party of Sioux. The Pawnee, badly outnumbered and completely surprised, retreated into the head of the canyon about two miles northwest of here. The battle was the retreat of the Pawnee down the canyon to the Republican.

The Pawnee reached the Republican River, about a mile and a half south of here, and crossed to the other side. The Sioux were ready to pursue them still further, but a unit of cavalry arrived and prevented further fighting.

The defeat so broke the strength and spirit of the tribe that it moved from its reservation in central Nebraska to Oklahoma."

Several aspects of this telling of the battle are disputed by the historical record. Sources disagree about what role, if any, the cavalry played in stopping the violence. The United States government had agreed to protect the Pawnee as per the 1857 Treaty signed between the two governments. Also, the claim that the massacre "broke the strength and spirit" of the Pawnee causing the tribe to move from its reservation to Oklahoma fails to note that the primary cause of the Pawnee's move to Oklahoma was the mismanagement of the Pawnee reservation. The United States government failed to honor the treaty rights guaranteed to the Pawnee, including protection from the Sioux. The Sioux and Pawnee had been in occasional conflict since the Sioux migrated into the Great Plains in the 18th century but the added pressure of encroaching settler-colonists, the coerced cession of Pawnee lands, and the withholding of promised resources by the United States government made the situation untenable for the Pawnee.

The monument is located in a small park area with picnic tables and a visitor center and museum that features exhibits about early pioneers, the tribal customs of the Sioux and the Pawnee people and a gift shop.

== See also ==
- List of battles fought in Nebraska
- Pawnee Reservation

== Bibliography ==
- Boughter, Judith A. The Pawnee Nation: An Annotated Research Bibliography (Lanham, MD: Scarecrow Press), 2004. ISBN 0-8108-4990-9
