= Dog Soldiers =

Military society of the Cheyenne nation

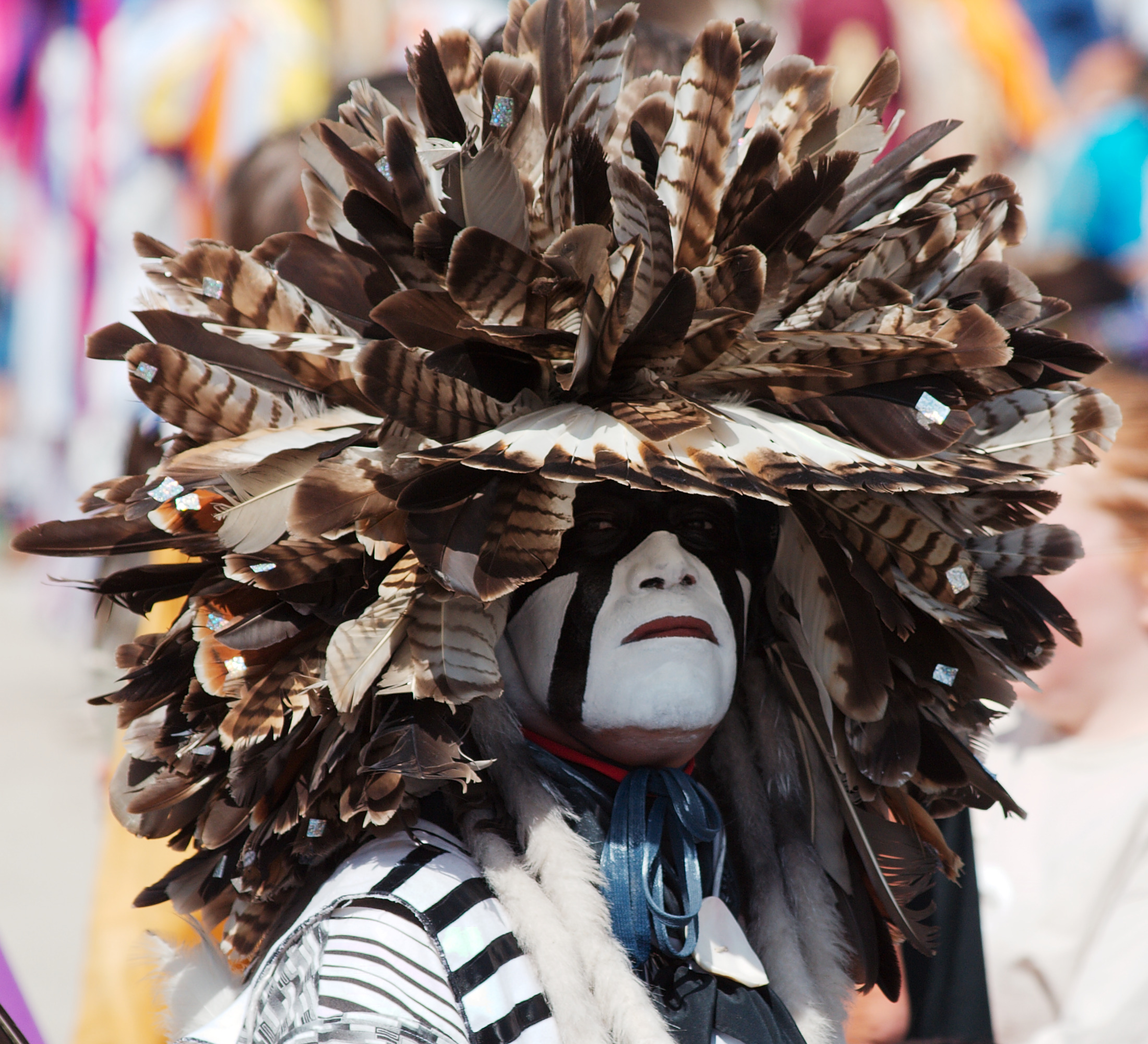
A modern Dog Soldier headdress at a pow wow

The Dog Soldiers or Dog Men (Cheyenne: Hotamétaneo'o) are historically one of six Cheyenne military societies. Beginning in the late 1830s, this society evolved into a separate, militaristic band that played a dominant role in Cheyenne resistance to the westward expansion of the United States in the area of present-day Kansas, Nebraska, Colorado, and Wyoming, where the Cheyenne had settled in the early nineteenth century.

After nearly half the Southern Cheyenne died in the cholera pandemic of 1849, many of the remaining Masikota band joined the Dog Soldiers. It effectively became a separate band, occupying the territory between the Northern and Southern Cheyenne. Its members often opposed policies of peace chiefs such as Black Kettle. In 1869, United States Army forces killed most of the band in the Battle of Summit Springs in Colorado Territory. The surviving Cheyenne societies became much smaller and more secretive in their operations.

== Cheyenne tribal governance ==
The two central institutions of traditional Cheyenne tribal governance are the Council of Forty-Four and the military societies, the Dog Soldiers. The Council of Forty-Four is the council of chiefs, comprising four chiefs from each of the ten Cheyenne bands, plus four principal or "Old Man" chiefs, known to have had previously served with distinction on the council. While chiefs are responsible for overall governance of individual bands and the tribe as a whole, the headmen of warrior societies are charged with maintaining discipline within the tribe, overseeing tribal hunts and ceremonies, and providing military leadership.

=== Dog Soldiers ===
Historically, Dog Soldiers have been regarded as both highly aggressive and effective combatants. One tradition recalls that in battle, they would "pin" themselves to a "chosen" piece of ground, through an unusually long breech-clout "rear-apron", by use of one of three "Sacred Arrows" that they traditionally carried into battle.

== Emergence as a separate band ==
=== Porcupine Bear ===
Prior to the peace council held at Bent's Fort in 1840, the Algonquian-speaking Southern Cheyenne and Arapaho were allied against their traditional enemies, the Comanche, Kiowa, and Plains Apache, who belonged to different language families and cultures. In 1837, while raiding the Kiowa horse herds along the North Fork of the Red River, a party of 48 Cheyenne Bowstring Men were discovered and killed by Kiowa and Comanche warriors. Porcupine Bear, chief of the Dog Soldiers, took up the war pipe of the Cheyenne. He carried it to the various Cheyenne and Arapaho camps in order to gain support for revenge against the Kiowa. He reached a Northern Cheyenne camp along the South Platte River just after it had traded for liquor from American Fur Company at Fort Laramie.

Porcupine Bear joined in the drinking. He sat and sang Dog Soldier war songs. Two of his cousins, Little Creek and Around, became caught up in a drunken fight. Little Creek got on top of Around and held up a knife, ready to stab Around; at that point, Porcupine Bear, aroused by Around's calls for help, tore the knife away from Little Creek, and stabbed him with it several times. He forced Around to finish off Little Creek.

By the rules governing military societies, a man who murdered or accidentally killed another member of his tribe had blood on his hands and was prohibited from joining a society. A society's member who committed such a crime was expelled and outlawed. Porcupine Bear was expelled from the Dog Soldiers, and he and his relatives had to camp apart from the rest of the Cheyenne. The Dog Soldiers were disgraced by Porcupine Bear's act. The other chiefs forbade them from leading war against the Kiowa.

Wolf reformed the Bowstring Society, which had been nearly annihilated in the fight with the Kiowa. It took over leading warfare against the Kiowa. Although outlawed by the main body of the Cheyenne, Porcupine Bear led the Dog Soldiers into battle against the Kiowa and Comanche at Wolf Creek. He and his warriors were reportedly the first to strike the enemy, considered an honor, but due to their status as outlaws, their feat was not celebrated.

=== Dog Soldier band ===
The outlawing of Porcupine Bear, his relatives, and his followers led to the transformation of the Dog Soldiers from a warrior society into a separate division of the tribe. In the wake of the cholera epidemic in 1849, which greatly reduced the Masikota band of Cheyenne, the remaining Masikota joined the Dog Soldiers.

When the Cheyenne bands camped together, the Dog Soldier band took the position in the camp circle formerly occupied by the Masikota. Prominent or ambitious warriors from other bands also gradually joined the Dog Soldier band. Over time, the Dog Soldiers took a prominent leadership role in the wars against the European settlers. The rest of the tribe began to regard them with respect and no longer as outlaws.

The Dog Soldiers contributed to the breakdown of the traditional matrilineal clan system of the Cheyennes. Customarily when a man married, he moved to the camp of his wife's band. Maintaining their separation, the Dog Soldiers brought all wives to their own camp. Other elements contributing to the breakdown of the traditional clan system were the high rate of deaths from the 1849 cholera epidemic, which killed perhaps half the Southern Cheyenne population, particularly devastating the Masikota band and nearly wiping out the Oktoguna. Losses in the Sand Creek Massacre of 1864 further disrupted the traditional Cheyenne kinship system. The Third Colorado Cavalry caused heavy casualties among the Wutapai (Black Kettle's band); and killed perhaps half of the Heévȧhetaneo'o under Yellow Wolf and Big Man, and half the Oévemana under War Bonnet. They also killed many among the Hesé'omeétaneo'o (Ridge Men) under White Antelope. The Dog Soldiers and the Masikota, who by that time operated as a band, were not at Sand Creek during the massacre.

The Dog Soldiers band took as its territory the headwaters country of the Republican and Smoky Hill rivers in southern Nebraska, northern Kansas, and the northeast of Colorado Territory. They were allies of the Sioux-speaking Lakota and Sicangu Lakota, who also frequented that area. The Cheyenne began to intermarry with the Lakota in that territory. Many Dog Soldiers were half-Lakota, including their leader Tall Bull. During the mid-1860s, Dog Soldier leaders, including Tall Bull and White Horse (Vóhpe'hame), frequently called on the great warrior Roman Nose, a Crooked Lance society member, to lead Dog Soldier strikes against settlers civilian and military assets. He led an attack on Fort Wallace in June 1867.

Due to an increasing division between the Dog Soldiers and the council chiefs with respect to policy toward the settlers, the Dog Soldiers became separated from the other Southern Cheyenne bands. They effectively became a third division of the Cheyenne people, between the Northern Cheyenne, who ranged north of the Platte River, and the Southern Cheyenne, who occupied the area north of the Arkansas River.

A strong band numbering perhaps 100 lodges, the Dog Soldiers were hostile to the encroaching settlers. By the 1860s, as conflict between Indigenous people and settlers intensified, the militaristic Dog Soldiers increased their influence, together with that of the warrior societies of other Cheyenne bands. The warriors became a significant counter-influence to the leadership of the traditional Council of Forty-Four chiefs, who were likely to favor working for peace with the settlers.

== Indian wars ==
In the late 1860s, the Dog Soldiers were crucial in Cheyenne resistance to the expansion into their territory. Dog Soldiers refused to sign treaties that limited their hunting grounds and restricted them to a reservation south of the Arkansas River. They attempted to hold their traditional lands at Smoky Hill, but the campaigns of General Philip Sheridan foiled these efforts. After the Battle of Beecher's Island, many Dog Soldiers were forced to retreat south of the Arkansas River.

In the spring of 1867 they returned north with the intention of joining Red Cloud and his Oglala band in Powder River. Attacked by General Eugene Carr, the Dog Soldiers began raiding settlements on Smoky Hill River in revenge. Eventually, Chief Tall Bull led them west into Colorado. After raiding sites in Kansas, they were attacked by a force composed of Pawnee Scouts led by Major Frank North, and United States cavalry, who killed 23 of an estimated 450 Cheyenne warriors (5%), including Tall Bull, in the Battle of Summit Springs in June 1869.

== See also ==
- Dog rope

== Bibliography ==
- Broome, Jeff Dog Soldier Justice: The Ordeal of Susanna Alderdice in the Kansas Indian War, Lincoln, Kansas: Lincoln County Historical Society, 2003. ISBN 0-9742546-1-4
- Brown, Dee. (1970). Bury My Heart at Wounded Knee: An Indian History of the American West. Owl Books. ISBN 0-8050-6669-1.
- Greene, Jerome A. (2004). Washita, The Southern Cheyenne and the U.S. Army, Campaigns and Commanders Series, vol. 3. Norman, OK: University of Oklahoma Press. ISBN 0-8061-3551-4.
- Hoig, Stan. (1980). The Peace Chiefs of the Cheyennes, Norman, OK: University of Oklahoma Press. ISBN 0-8061-1573-4.
- Hyde, George E. (1968). Life of George Bent Written from His Letters. Ed. by Savoie Lottinville, Norman, OK: University of Oklahoma Press. ISBN 0-8061-1577-7.
- Cozzens, Peter, "Eyewitnesses to the Indian Wars: 1865-1890: Vol.3, Conquering the Southern Plains," ISBN 0-8117-0019-4
