= Dog rope =

Cheyenne military equipment

A dog rope (Cheyenne: sétóhke) (Note: --this is Cheyenne for "rawhide rope") is a short length of rawhide rope that was used by the Dog Soldiers of the Cheyenne warrior societies and warriors considered especially brave of other tribes. Its purpose was to anchor the warrior in place when a last-ditch defence was called for, thus indicating an intention not to retreat even against overwhelming odds.

== Construction ==
The dog rope consisted of eight to twelve feet of rawhide around four inches wide. One end of the rope was tied to a picket pin (a pin that could be hammered into the ground, normally used for fixing the picket rope of a horse) by a string. The rope was usually carried wound over the right shoulder and under the left arm. It was looped through a slit cut in the free end to secure it to the wearer. It could also be hung from the belt by a string.

The leather of the rope was decorated with feathers and porcupine quills dyed bright colours. The picket pin was made of wood and painted red. Beadwork, although a common Native American form of decoration, was never used on dog ropes.

== Background ==
The Cheyennes on the Great Plains of the American Old West had a number of warrior societies. Virtually all Cheyenne young men belonged to one or other of these societies. One society would be appointed by the tribal chiefs to act as camp police. This society also organised warfare and hunting expeditions as the need arose.

The societies took it in turns to fulfil this role. The use of the dog rope amongst the Cheyennes was peculiar to the Dog Warrior Society. The Dog society eventually took on the nature of a separate band of Cheyennes as opposed to a society within the bands. This band became known to the whites as the Dog Soldiers. They were much admired amongst the Cheyenne for their bravery and they played a leading role in the fighting against US forces.

However, the use of dog ropes was not limited to the Cheyenne. They were also used by many other plains tribes, including the Arapahos, Mandans, Kiowas and Apaches. The term dog rope is thus unlikely to derive from the Dog warrior society. According to an informant of Marquis the term dog soldier is a general term for a camp guard, so called because they complement the barked warnings of the camp dogs. Thus, the use of a dog rope by a dog soldier is to be compared to the leash of a guard dog.

== Usage ==
Only warriors considered the bravest carried a dog rope. If a warrior carried a dog rope then he was obliged to use it if needed. They were typically used as a last resort in defending a camp under attack as a last-ditch stand. A warrior might also declare in advance, in order to demonstrate his bravery, that in the next battle he would use his dog rope regardless of the necessity. When required, the dog rope warriors would insert their picket pins into the ground. Once inserted, the warrior was obliged to restrict his movements to the distance allowed by the length of the dog rope and fight and die on that spot.

The warrior was not permitted to remove the pin himself, but a comrade might do so if he considered it honorable or desirable. When a dog rope warrior was released in this way, he was ceremoniously driven off the field of battle by the releasing warrior with a quirt. The symbolism is that the dog rope warrior would not leave the fight of his own will. The use of a dog rope in battle was considered tantamount to suicide.

== Mythology and customs ==
Dog ropes were brought to the Cheyennes by the mythical and mystical founder of the Dog Soldiers. When no one showed interest in joining this proposed new society, he caused all the dogs to disappear, then all the buffalo, then himself. Some warriors reported seeing a vision of Dog Soldiers at the man's camp but they were gone when they returned with their friends. The man then produced four miniature dog ropes from his throat and instructed some women to make all future dog ropes to this pattern.

Two of the four dog ropes were to be given to unmarried men. The remaining two he reswallowed saying that anyone who wanted one would have to pay for it. One of the newly enrolled Dog Soldiers, Crooked Neck, was criticised by his mother, Dying Woman, for being badly painted. He asked for one of the dog ropes to show his worth, and received it after Dying Woman paid five dogs (including a wolf). Crooked Neck was then painted properly (red all over) and the buffalo returned to the plains.

This myth was used to explain certain traditions regarding dog ropes. Amongst the Cheyennes, there were only four dog ropes at any one time. Two of these, which had longer pins, were a higher grade than the other two. An owner of a dog rope could pass it on to a younger warrior, chosen by the society chiefs, but payment was expected. He who wished to receive a dog rope piled up goods until the owner considered the payment to be sufficient. If the owner was not satisfied with the offer, he could pick up the dog rope and put it down again in another place. The purchaser and his family then increased the pile of goods. This could be repeated several times. Finally, the owner would place the dog rope over the purchaser. Dancing then commenced to celebrate, starting with the seller leading the purchaser by the dog rope.

== Notable events ==
In 1835 a Kiowa village travelled north intending to trade with the Crows. They were attacked by Cheyennes from the Hevhaitanio clan led by Yellow Wolf and a band of Suhtais led by Black Shin. This fight occurred at Kiowa Creek, just east of Denver. A Kiowa chief carrying a dog rope attempted to single-handedly hold up the Cheyennes while the Kiowas built defences in nearby woodland. This Kiowa made repeated charges on horseback through the Cheyenne lines. He was finally brought down by arrow fire. Although he never dismounted to use his dog rope, he made such an impression on the Cheyennes that they were still telling the story of his bravery at meetings into the 20th century.

Grinnell records the use of a dog rope witnessed by Tall Bull, the leader of the Cheyenne Dog Soldiers. Little Man had been at the front of the charge, but then the Cheyennes started to retreat. Little Man dismounted and pinned his dog rope. This stopped the Cheyenne retreat but they began to be pushed back. Little Man was saved by a warbonnet Cheyenne who pulled up his pin and drove him back.

At the Battle of Summit Springs in 1869 the Cheyenne Dog Soldiers led by Tall Bull (who was killed in this engagement) were surprised by an attack from US soldiers. A number of Cheyennes became trapped in a ravine. A dog rope warrior, Wolf with Plenty of Hair, pinned his dog rope at the entrance of the ravine to defend them and was killed there. This was the last recorded use of a dog rope in battle.

== Bibliography ==
- Grinnell, George Bird, The Cheyenne Indians, pp. 65–71, University of Nebraska Press, 1923 ISBN 080327131X.
- Hyde, George E., Life of George Bent, University of Oklahoma Press, 1968 ISBN 0806174773.
- Marquis, Thomas B., The Cheyennes of Montana, pp. 121–122, Reference Publications, 1978 ISBN 0917256093.
