= Two Strike (Lakota leader) =

Chief Two Strike
- Núm KaȟpÁ
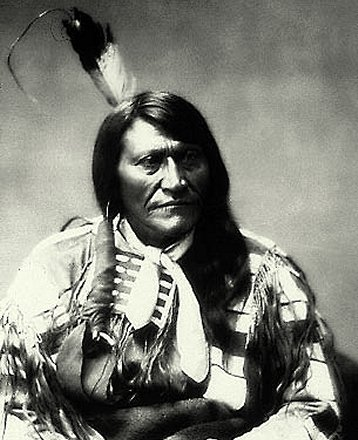

Brulé, Lakota leader

Personal details
- Born: c. 1831 White River Valley
- Died: 1915 Rosebud Indian reservation, South Dakota
- Nickname: "Knocks Two Off"

Two Strike (Lakota: Núm KaȟpÁ; (Note: Also transcribed Numpkahapa, Nomkahpa) c. 1831–1915) was a Brulé Lakota chief born in the White River Valley in present-day Nebraska. He earned his Lakota name "Nomkahpa", meaning "Knocks Two Off" in a battle with Utes, when he knocked two off their horses with a single blow of his war club. Two Strike fought in various battles against the U.S. Army during the early conflict of the Plains Indian wars and of the Great Sioux wars with Chief Crow Dog and Chief Crazy Horse as well as various war exploits and atrocities against the Pawnee.

Two Strike and his band were present along with bands of the Southern Cheyenne, at the Battle of Summit Springs on July 11, 1869, when the U.S. Fifth Cavalry and 50 Pawnee scouts made a surprise attack against their camp. Buffalo Bill Cody was present at the battle serving in the capacity as chief scout. Chief Tall Bull of the Southern Cheyenne along with 51 members of the combined Lakota-Cheyenne encampment were killed and 17 women and children were taken prisoner, the rest of the Lakota and Cheyenne managed to escape. The soldiers then burned their camp including their tipis and supplies.

Chief Two Strike was one of the principal chiefs of combined Oglala and Brulé war party of over a thousand braves that attacked a band of Pawnee Indians, old hated enemies that had left their reservation in Nebraska to hunt buffalo on August 5, 1873. More than 70 to 100 Pawnee were killed in the battle/massacre which occurred in and along a bluff in present-day Hitchcock County, Nebraska near the republican river. The incident was subsequently named Massacre Canyon.
