= Powder River Battle =

- Powder River Battles may refer to:
- Battle of Powder River (1876)
- Powder River Battles (1865)

== See also ==
- Powder River Massacre (1865)
