= Fanny Kelly =

American pioneer and author (1845–1904)

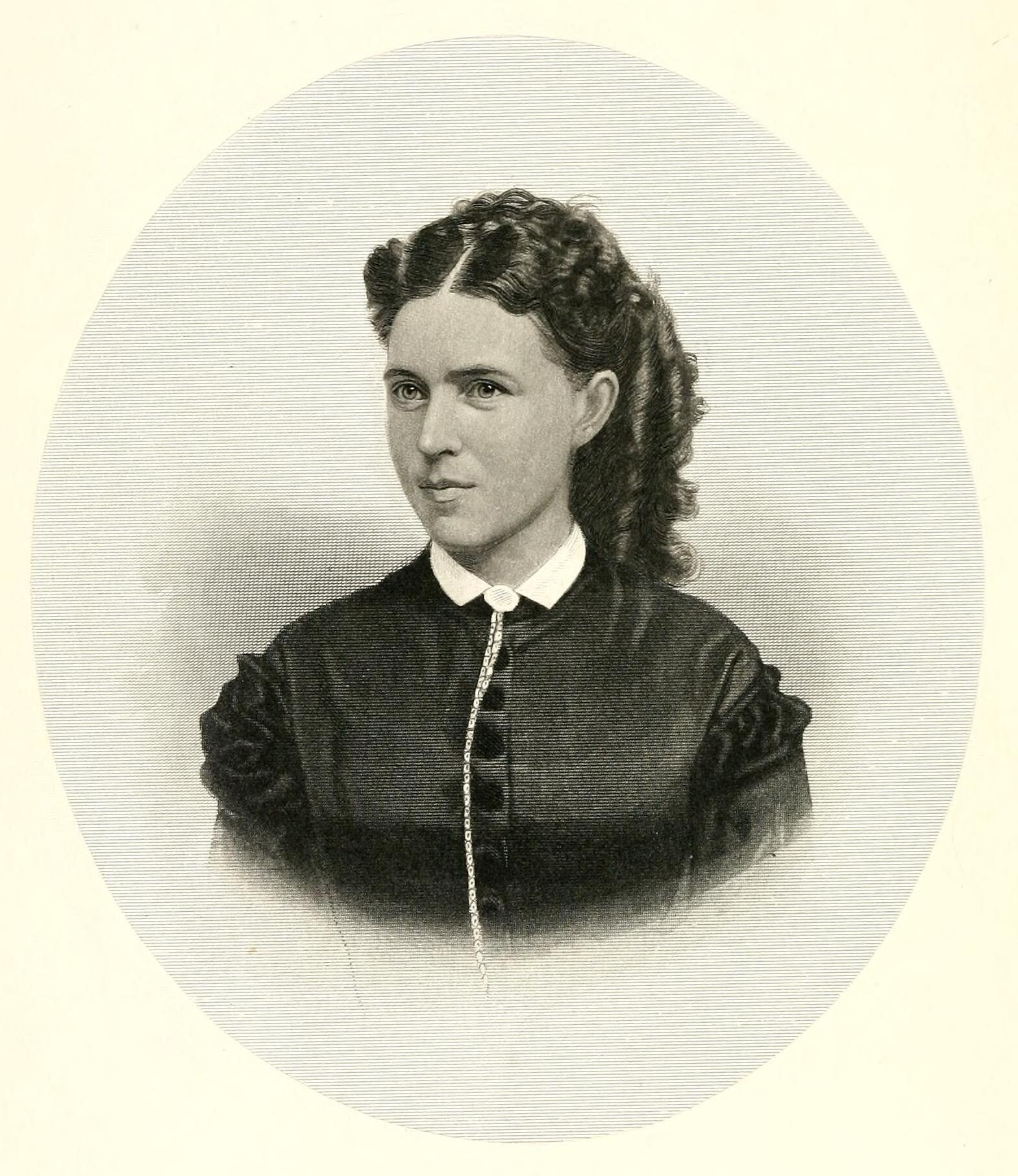
Fanny Kelly

Fanny Kelly (c. 1845–1904) was a North American pioneer woman captured by the Sioux and freed five months later. She later wrote a book about her experiences called Narrative of My Captivity among the Sioux Indians in 1871.

== Early life ==
Fanny Wiggins was born in Orillia in Canada West in about 1845. In 1856, her parents, James and Margaret Wiggins, relocated their family to the new town of Geneva in the soon-to-be state of Kansas. Along the way, her father died of cholera, leaving the family to settle in Geneva on their own.

In 1863, Fanny married Josiah S. Kelly, also of Geneva, a farmer and discharged Union soldier at least fifteen years her senior. Josiah hoped that a change of climate would aid his failing health, so he, Fanny, and her seven-year-old niece and adopted daughter, Mary Hurley set out on May 17, 1864 for the region that is now Idaho or Montana. With them were two black servants, Franklin and Andy, and the Kellys' twenty-eight-year-old neighbor, Gardner Wakefield. A fellow traveler, a Methodist clergyman named Mr. Sharp, joined them a few days later. A couple of weeks after that, William and Sarah Larimer and their eight-year-old son Frank, with whom the Kellys were acquainted, left a large wagon train to accompany them. The party was later joined by Noah Daniel Taylor, who drove the Larimers' wagon.

== Captivity ==
On July 12, the ill-fated party had crossed Little Box Elder Creek in Wyoming on the Oregon Trail when they encountered a large group of "about two hundred and fifty" Miniconjous and Hunkpapas, reported by Fanny Kelly to be "painted and equipped for war", led by their war chief, Ottawa, a chieftain of the Oglala band. By Kelly's account, vastly outnumbered, the immigrants tried to placate the warriors. By the one Sioux account, the Indians had gone to see the white man's "Holy Road" (the Oregon Trail) that they had heard about, met some whites, and ate and smoked with them. While they were eating, a Sioux messenger arrived, reporting that U.S. soldiers had killed some of their relatives on the Missouri River, apparently putting their heads on poles. The Sioux, agitated, then shot some of the emigrants, with Sharp, Taylor, and Franklin being killed immediately. Wakefield was seriously injured. Josiah Kelly, William Larimer, and Andy got away, while the two women and two children were taken captive. Another wagon that happened on the scene by chance sped off, at the cost of one person's life. The Sioux then proceeded to loot the five wagons.

Josiah Kelly and Andy separately made their way to the protection of a large wagon train some miles away, as did the people of the other wagon that had passed by. They later found William Larimer, with an arrow wound to the arm, and Wakefield with three arrows in him, but still alive. After a couple of days, the party made its way to Deer Creek Station, where there was an army garrison.

Meanwhile, the prisoners attempted to escape. The very night of their capture, Fanny Kelly had Mary Hurley slip away in the darkness. Fanny herself tried to follow, but was caught and beaten. Mary's scalped and arrow-ridden body was found a few days later and buried by her uncle. Sarah Larimer and her eight year-old son, Frank, did manage to escape the next night. They were reunited with William Larimer at Deer Creek Station. When he had recovered from his wound, the family returned to Kansas.

=== Her own account of her ordeal ===
According to Fanny, she was nearly killed by an old chief for losing his pipe, which she had dropped and broken. She managed to dispel the wrath of her captors by presenting them with some banknotes, telling them of their value. Another life-threatening quarrel ensued when she innocently accepted a gift of stockings from the brother-in-law of the old chief, inadvertently committing a social blunder. Angered, the chief killed one of his brother-in-law's horses. The brother-in-law sought to retaliate by aiming an arrow at Fanny, but a young Blackfeet named Jumping Bear snatched his bow away; the quarrel ended with the chief giving his brother-in-law another horse in return for the one he had killed.

The band arrived at their home village, only to be attacked by a Union Army force led by Brigadier General Alfred Sully. Fanny was hustled away with the rest of the women and children. Freedom was not to be so quickly gained. After several days of pursuit, Sully's men gave up. When the Sioux returned to their homes, they were so angered at their losses, they threatened to burn Fanny at the stake. At a council to decide her fate, Ottawa spoke up for her, and she was spared. She became Ottawa's "exclusive property". She described him as being "over seventy-five years of age, and partially blind".

One day, a Sioux named Porcupine arrived at the camp, bearing a letter from Captain Marshall of the Eleventh Ohio Cavalry detailing the attempts that had been made to rescue her. Porcupine had been offered a reward to help free her, but he chose not to do so, refusing even to take back a message to the Army.

On September 5, a large band of Sioux attacked part of a wagon train led by Captain James L. Fisk taking settlers to what is now Montana; the attack was repulsed, the whites suffering twelve deaths to six by the Sioux. The Sioux made Fanny exchange letters with Captain Fisk, hoping to get him to lower his guard against further attack, but since the Sioux were illiterate in English, Fanny was able to warn Fisk of their intentions. Fisk tried unsuccessfully to ransom her, but he promised to spread the news of her situation.

The old chief Ottawa went away on a journey, and Fanny was sent to live in another village with an elderly couple. While there, she met and spoke several times with the chief "Man-Afraid-of-His-Horses". She later found out he had been given two expensive outfits by her husband as ransom for her release, but had instead reported to Mr. Kelly that he could not find her.

General Sully had been sent to stop the Indian attacks on settlers beginning in 1862. The Sihasapa became weary of the fighting and offered peace. Informed by Captain Fisk of Fanny's plight, Sully insisted she be freed as part of the agreement, even though the Sihasapa protested she was being held by the Oglala. In November, Sihasapa warriors, including the prominent leader Kill Eagle, went to the Oglala camp to negotiate for Fanny's release, but the Oglala resisted the idea of giving her up. The Sihasapa proceeded to take Fanny away without Oglala permission. When the Oglala pursued them to reclaim her, the two groups parleyed. It was eventually agreed that the Sihasapa would be allowed to keep Fanny.

Fanny was taken to a Sihasapa village. She found out that other groups, having learned of the reward offered for her return, had been trying to buy her. White traders in four wagons came to purchase her release at one point; all but one were killed. Fanny began to fear that the Sihasapa intended to attack Fort Sully and not give her up after all.

One day, Jumping Bear, who had protected her when she was first captured, visited her, reminding her that he had saved her life, and saying he wanted to be "more than a friend" to her. Fanny asked him to take a letter from her to General Sully; he reluctantly agreed. In the letter, she warned of a planned attack using her return as a ruse to gain entry to the fort. Though Fanny never saw Jumping Bear again, the letter he delivered for her led to her eventual release.

A large contingent of Sihasapa warriors took her to Fort Sully, a journey of some two hundred miles. On December 9, a group of eight to twelve chiefs escorted her into the fort; the gates were shut behind the small party, precluding the attack that Fanny believed to have been planned. Fanny was free, after five months of captivity. Two months later her husband joined her at Fort Sully, and confirmed to her that their daughter was dead.

=== Alternate account ===
According to several books, Fanny did not live with the aged Ottawa. Despite her claim that "I had never suffered from any of [the Oglallas] the slightest personal or unchaste insult", by other accounts, she was sold to a Hunkpapa Sioux named Brings Plenty to be his wife. So pleased was he with her docile demeanor, especially compared to Sioux women, that he named her "Real Woman", and it was only with great difficulty that Fanny was prised away from him by no less than Sitting Bull. In this version of events, Fanny was returned safely to Fort Sully under Sitting Bull's protection.

== Later life ==
Fanny and her husband returned to Geneva, then moved, first to Shawneetown, then to Ellsworth, Kansas. There, an outbreak of cholera claimed Josiah Kelly, who succumbed on July 28, 1867. Their child was born after Josiah's death.

She was persuaded to go live with the Larimers, who had settled in Wyoming. While there, however, she claimed her manuscript was stolen for the purpose of plagiarism. Sarah Larimer published a book about her own brief experience in 1870 called The Capture and Escape; or, Life among the Sioux. Fanny had to resort to litigation.
