= Kill Eagle =

Native American leader

- Waŋblí Kté
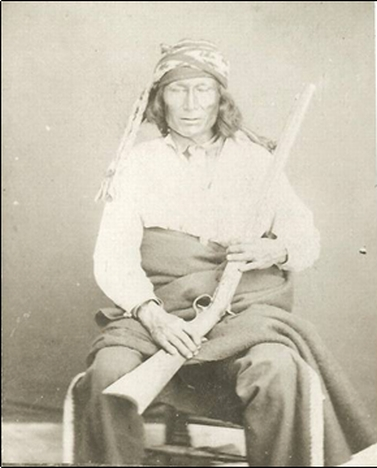
- Portrait attributed to William R. Cross, circa. 1882

Sihasapa, Lakota leader

Personal details
- Born: c. 1827 probably South Dakota
- Died: 1885 Standing Rock Indian Reservation
- Spouse: First Woman

Waŋblí Kte (Kill Eagle; ca. 1827–1885) was a leader of the Sihasapa (Blackfeet) band of Lakota people during the late nineteenth century.

== Early years ==
Born about 1827, Kill Eagle was the son of a Brulé father and a Sihasapa mother. His father may have been the first leader of a small Sihasapa band known as the Wazhazha (not to be confused with a Brule/Oglala band by the same name). Kill Eagle gained prominence through one of the "soldiers societies" (akicita). In 1864, he helped return the white captive, Fanny Kelly.

By 1866, Kill Eagle had assumed his father's role as leader of the Wazhazha band (Sihasapa). He signed the Treaty of 1868 at Fort Rice, agreeing to settle his band on the Great Sioux Reservation. By the early 1870s, his band was the second largest among the Sihasapa and had settled on the Missouri River near the Standing Rock Agency in present northern South Dakota. They experimented with farming and received rations from the Office of Indian Affairs through the Indian agent at Standing Rock.

== Great Sioux War, 1876-77 ==
Map of the Little Bighorn Battlefield, 1876. This map was created by Capt. Robert E. Johnston, acting Indian Agent at the Standing Rock Agency, based on Kill Eagle's interview about the famous battle. Courtesy National Archives.

In the spring of 1876, an embargo on the sale of ammunition to the Lakota was put in place as part of the escalation of the government's conflict with the Lakota over the Black Hills. While this policy was intended to limit access to ammunition for the non-treaty ("hostile") bands such as that of Sitting Bull, it also impacted friendly bands on the reservation such as that of Kill Eagle. Concerned that rations were not sufficient to feed his people, Kill Eagle illegally departed Standing Rock in May 1876 with approximately 26 lodges, heading out on a buffalo hunt. The remainder of Kill Eagle's band remained at Standing Rock under the leadership of Red Hawk.

The lodges with Kill Eagle successfully killed buffalo but then inadvertently ended up in the main Indian non-treaty Indian village that had gathered for the annual sundance. They soon found themselves caught up in the Great Sioux War. Kill Eagle was abused when he refused to join in the fight against the army at the Battle of the Rosebud and he also appears to have stayed out of the fighting at the Battle of the Little Bighorn. Kill Eagle and his lodges managed to slip away from the main village and surrendered at the Standing Rock Agency on September 15, 1876. He was interviewed by army officers about the Little Bighorn and his comments were widely reported in the press, one of the first native perspectives of Custer's defeat. He also gave information for one of the earliest maps of the battleground.

Kill Eagle and his followers were treated as prisoners of war for nearly a year, with another prominent Sihasapa named Goose serving as band leader.

== Standing Rock Reservation ==
Kill Eagle was again recognized as band leader for the Wazhazha in 1877 and he remained at Standing Rock for the remainder of his life. In the Sitting Bull Surrender Census, taken in September 1881, Kill Eagle is shown as leader of a small band of 25 families, totaling 123 people. Kill Eagle's own family included his wife, First Born, and three daughters named Medicine Woman, Foolish Woman and Pretty Face. He had four horses, five cows, two dogs and twelve chickens. The census also noted that Kill Eagle had cultivated two acres for the past two years and had cut twelve tons of hay and produced 37 1/2 bushels of corn.

Kill Eagle disappeared from the census and rations records in 1885, suggesting that he died sometime during that year.

== Bibliography ==
- Dickson, Ephriam D. III. "Prisoners in the Indian Camp: Kill Eagle's Band at the Little Bighorn," Greasy Grass 27 (May 2011): 3-11. Presents a new map of the famous battle and a short biography of the noted Sihasapa leader Kill Eagle.
- Dickson, Ephriam D. III. The Sitting Bull Surrender Census: The Lakotas at Standing Rock Agency, 1881 (Pierre: South Dakota State Historical Society Press, 2010).
- Donahue, Michael N. Drawing Battle Lines: The Map Testimony of Custer's Last Fight. El Segundo, CA: Upton and Sons, Publishers, 2009.
- Graham, W. A. The Custer Myth. New York: Bonanza Books, 1953.
- "Kill Eagle's Story of His Stay with the Hostiles," New York Herald, 24 Sept., 6 Oct. 1876.
