= John Grass =

Chief John Grass
- Sihasapa band chief, Lakota
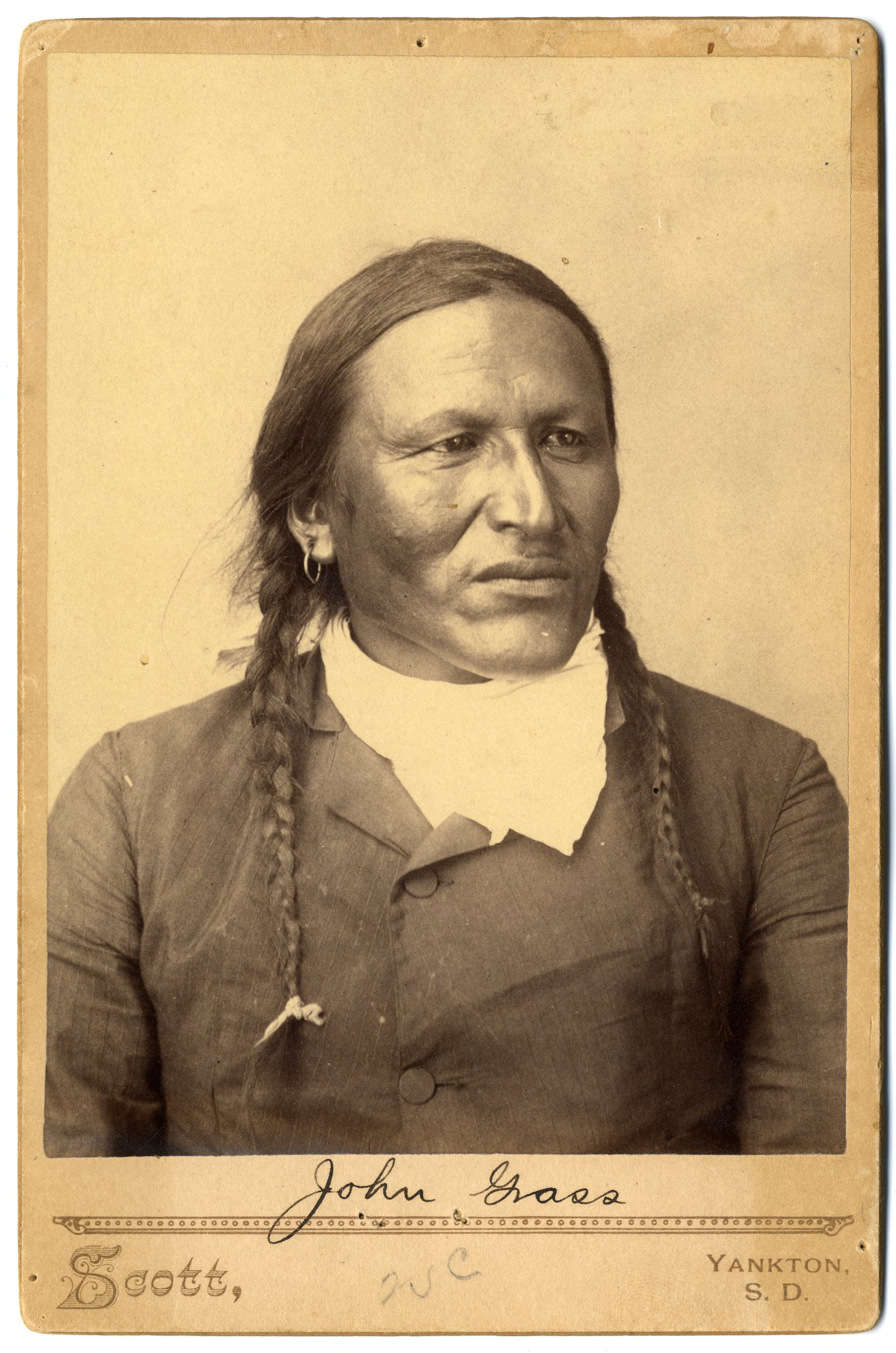
- Matȟó Watȟákpe
- Born: c. 1836
- Died: May 10, 1918 (aged 82); Fort Yates, Sioux, North Dakota, USA
- Spouse: Cecilia Walking Shield
- Father: Used As A Shield Grass
- Mother: Wawapilakiyewin Woman who does many Favors

John Grass, Matȟó Watȟákpe or Charging Bear (c. 1836–May 10, 1918) was a chief of the Sihasapa (Blackfeet) band of Lakota people during the 1870s through 1890s. He fought at the Battle of the Little Bighorn in Montana. In the summer of 1873, he led his men of the Sihasapa and Oglala/Brule against the Pawnee in Nebraska near the Republican River, killing between 75 and 100 Pawnee men with mostly women and children, although the estimates of dead ranged at 156. The incident was named The Battle of Massacre Canyon.

== Background ==
Grass was known as Charging Bear in his youth. He was born near Grand River in South Dakota in 1836. Both his father, Used as a Shield, and grandfather, Sicola (Bare Foot), were important Sihasapa leaders. When he was three years old, Grass was baptized at a Jesuit mission by Pierre-Jean De Smet, a Jesuit Father. Grass married three sisters, including Cecilia Walking Shield in a Lakota ceremony in 1867, and in 1894 he and Cecilia renewed their marriage vows in a Roman Catholic ceremony. Some sources say Grass had four children; others give a larger number but many died at a young age. One son was named Own's Spotted, and one daughter was named Theresa Grass-Cross.

John Grass attended the Carlisle Indian Industrial School in Carlisle, Pennsylvania, where he learned to read and speak English fluently. He utilized his knowledge of the English language on behalf of his people, when engaged in negotiations with the United States government.

== Military and diplomatic career ==
In the 1850s and 1860s, Grass participated in battles against tribal enemies. He was a member of the White Horse Riders Society. From the late 1870s until his death, Grass served as chief justice of the Court of Indian Offenses for the Standing Rock Agency in North Dakota. Together with his friend Hunkpapa warrior Gall, Grass advocated for formal education and agricultural lifestyles for his tribe as a means of survival. He fought the US government's efforts to take more Lakota lands, and in 1888 led a widespread resistance to Pratt Commission's attempt to break up the Great Sioux Reservation; however, the land was sold under the Crooks Commission's oversight in 1889. The US government failed to honor its treaty and statutory obligations, and in 1902 Grass led a delegation to Washington, D.C., to convey Lakota grievances to the federal government.

== Death ==
John Grass died on May 10, 1918, at his home near Fort Yates, North Dakota, on the Standing Rock Reservation.

== Legacy ==
Grass led his warriors at the 1873 battle of Massacre Canyon in Nebraska, in which a Lakota war party attacked a group of Pawnee on a buffalo hunt. A monument commemorating the event, one of the last large battles between Native American tribes in the United States, was placed near the site of the canyon. Carved upon the 35-foot granite obelisk is the face of John Grass, slightly higher and opposite the carving of Ruling His Son's face, a Pawnee chief also at the battle that day.

During the time of the Ghost Dance movement and the Wounded Knee Massacre, Grass advocated peace with the United States, which did not earn him the respect of many Hunkpapa leaders. Chief White Bull described Grass as: "A good talker... not a thinker or a smart man... could always say yes but never no."
