= Battle of Summit Springs =

1869 conflict in the Comanche War

- Part of the American Indian Wars
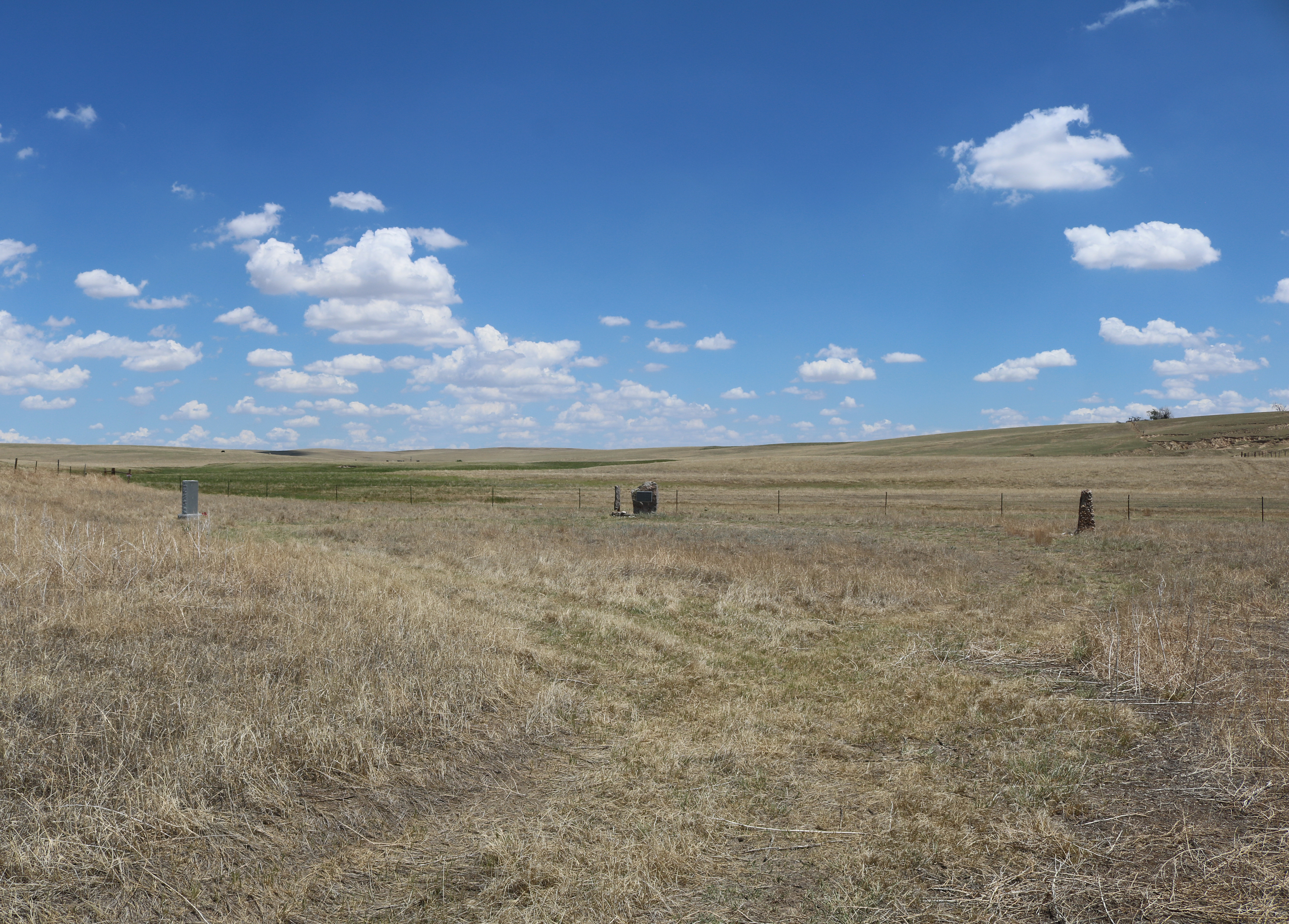
- Summit Springs battlefield showing three of the memorials
Date	July 11, 1869
Location	Washington County, Colorado 40°25′58″N 103°8′21″W
Result	United States victory

Belligerents
United States	Arapaho; Cheyenne; Sioux

Commanders and leaders
(United States) Eugene A. Carr	Tall Bull †

Strength
244 soldiers 50 scouts	~450 men, women and children

Casualties and losses
1 wounded	~35 killed 17 captured
- Civilian Casualties 1 killed 1 wounded
- Location within Colorado

The Battle of Summit Springs, on July 11, 1869, was an armed conflict between elements of the United States Army under the command of Colonel Eugene A. Carr and a group of Cheyenne Dog Soldiers led by Tall Bull, who was killed during the engagement. The US forces were assigned to retaliate for a series of raids in north-central Kansas by Chief Tall Bull's Dog Soldiers band of the Cheyenne. The battlefield is located south of today's Sterling, Colorado, in Washington County near the Logan/Washington county line.

== Background ==
American expansion into the central plains after the Homestead Acts and the end of the Civil War led to increased conflicts between settlers and the local Indian tribes. The Republican River Valley, a Cheyenne Dog Soldier stronghold under Chief Tall Bull, saw heightened tensions by 1869. Raids on Kansas settlements escalated, with a notable attack on May 30, 1869, near Fossil Creek, where Cheyenne warriors killed 13 settlers and abducted Susanna Alderdice, a 29-year-old mother of four, and Maria Weichell. The two women's abductions sparked outrage and demands for military action.

Nebraska Governor David Butler, citing imminent threats reported by settlers and scouts, urged General Christopher C. Augur, commander of the Department of the Platte, to intervene. Augur, constrained by limited forces, initially supplied settlers with 50 Spencer carbines and 10,000 rounds, but promised a follow-up cavalry expedition to clear the valley.

Under Augur's orders, the Republican River Expedition launched from Fort McPherson on June 9, 1869 under the command of Colonel Eugene A. Carr, a veteran campaigner known as "The Black-Bearded Cossack." On July 3, after nearly a month of fleeting Indian encounters, equipment problems, and grueling travel of up to 30 miles daily through the harsh landscape of the plains, scouts finally located a deserted Cheyenne camp, suggesting Tall Bull was nearby. On the afternoon of July 10, scouts found a Cheyenne camp that had been abandoned for less than a day, and General Carr ordered a forced night march that night to finally enable a surprise attack on Tall Bull's village the next morning.

== Battle ==
After Pawnee Scouts under Major Frank North led his command to Tall Bull's village, Carr carefully deployed his 244 men of the 5th United States Regiment of Cavalry and 50 Pawnee Scouts so that they hit the unsuspecting camp from three sides at once. Captain Luther North of the Pawnee Scout Battalion related this incident in the book Man of the Plains:

About a half mile from and off to one side from our line, a Cheyenne boy was herding horses. He was about fifteen years old and we were very close to him before he saw us. He jumped on his horse and gathered up his herd and drove them into the village ahead of our men, who were shooting at him. He was mounted on a very good horse and could easily have gotten away if he had left his herd, but he took them all in ahead of him, then at the edge of the village he turned and joined a band of warriors that were trying to hold us back, while the women and children were getting away, and there he died like a warrior. No braver man ever existed than that 15 year old boy.

Major Frank North saw an Indian rise from cover and take aim at him. He shot and killed the man, who turned out to be Chief Tall Bull. Meanwhile, the Pawnee surrounded 20 Cheyenne warriors who were sheltering in a ravine. Armed only with bows and arrows, the Cheyenne kept their attackers at bay until their arrows ran out, whereupon the Pawnees moved in and killed them all.

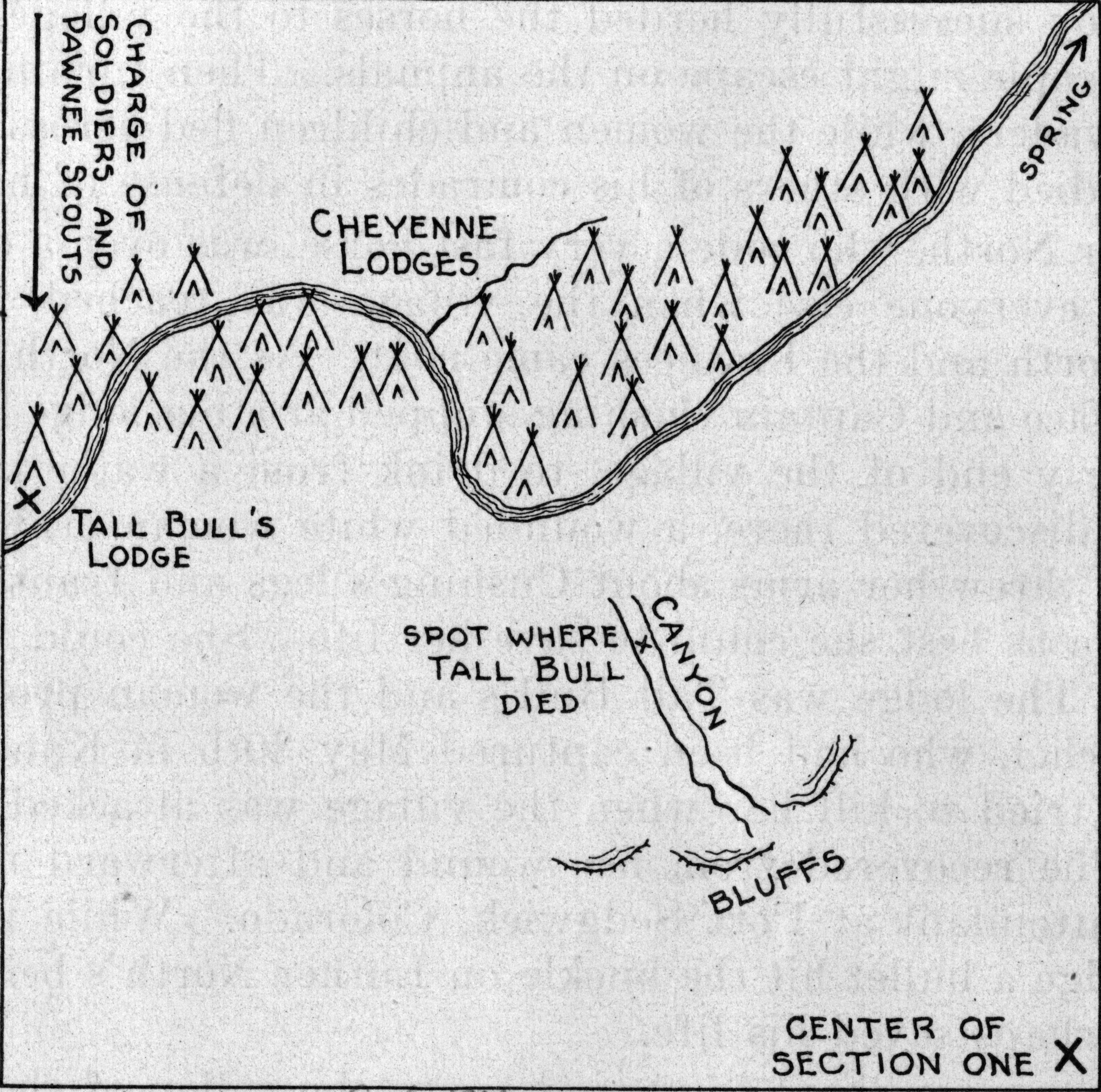
A map of the area where the Battle of Summit Springs took place. Included are the placements of Cheyenne tepees along the stream, the direction from whence came the attack by soldiers and Pawnee scouts, the location of Tall Bull's tepee and place of his death in a canyon, and the bluffs above the canyon.

According to the anthropologist George Bird Grinnell (who worked with George Bent in the 20th century on these accounts), in addition to Tall Bull and the twenty men in the ravine, nine other people were killed by members of the Pawnee Scout Battalion: two warriors (Lone Bear and Pile of Bones); a very old Suhtai woman on a slow pony; two Sioux women running on foot; a Cheyenne woman and two children (a boy and a girl); and an old Sioux woman whose horse fell and threw her. Grinnell noted only four victims who were not attributed to the Pawnee Scout Battalion: the wife, mother-in-law and two young children of a man named Red Cherries. Grinnell and Donald J. Berthrong identified 23 warriors, one fifteen-year-old boy, five women and two children killed by members of the Pawnee Scout Battalion, and two women and two children whose killers are not specified. This gives a total of 35 people killed. It appears that, although the 5th Cavalrymen had the greater number of participants, the Pawnees were more successful in the killing.

One Cheyenne escaped on Tall Bull's distinctive white horse. He was shot off it by Scout William Cody (Buffalo Bill) in a skirmish the next day, leading Cody to believe that he had killed Tall Bull. In his biography of Luther North, Grinnell footnoted this event, saying:

William Cody later claimed he had killed Tall Bull and Cody's protagonists [sic] have stated that Luther North's account of the shooting was an invention. However, while Frank was a partner with Cody in the cattle business, he related the story of the shooting in detail essentially as Luther recollected it.

Carr reported only a single casualty in his command (a trooper wounded) and claimed that 52 Indians had been killed. Seventeen women and children were captured, along with more than 300 horses and mules. One white woman captive, Susanna Alderdice, was killed by her captors and the other, Maria Weichell, was wounded but rescued. The victory yielded significant spoils, including over 400 horses and camp supplies, dismantling the Dog Soldiers’ regional power.

== Aftermath ==
Arriving at Fort Sedgwick on July 15, Carr reported success, earning commendations from Augur, General W. H. Emory, and regional legislatures. The campaign's neutralization of the Indian threat in the Republican River Valley greatly accelerated American settlement in the region. Subsequent operations confirmed the area’s pacification.

== See also ==
- List of battles fought in Colorado

== Sources ==
- Berthrong, Donald J. (1963). The Southern Cheyennes. Norman, OK: University of Oklahoma Press.
- Grinnell, George Bird (1915). The Fighting Cheyennes. Norman, OK: University of Oklahoma Press.
- Michno, Gregory F. (2003). Encyclopedia of Indian Wars: Western Battles and Skirmishes, 1850-1890. Missoula, MT: Mountain Press Publishing Company. ISBN 0-87842-468-7.
- North, Luther (1961). Man of the Plains: Recollections of Luther North. Pioneer Heritage Series Vol. VI. Norman, OK: University of Oklahoma Press.
