= Powder River Massacre =

1865 killing of 24 Cheyenne in present-day Wyoming

- Part of the Powder River Expedition, Sioux Wars
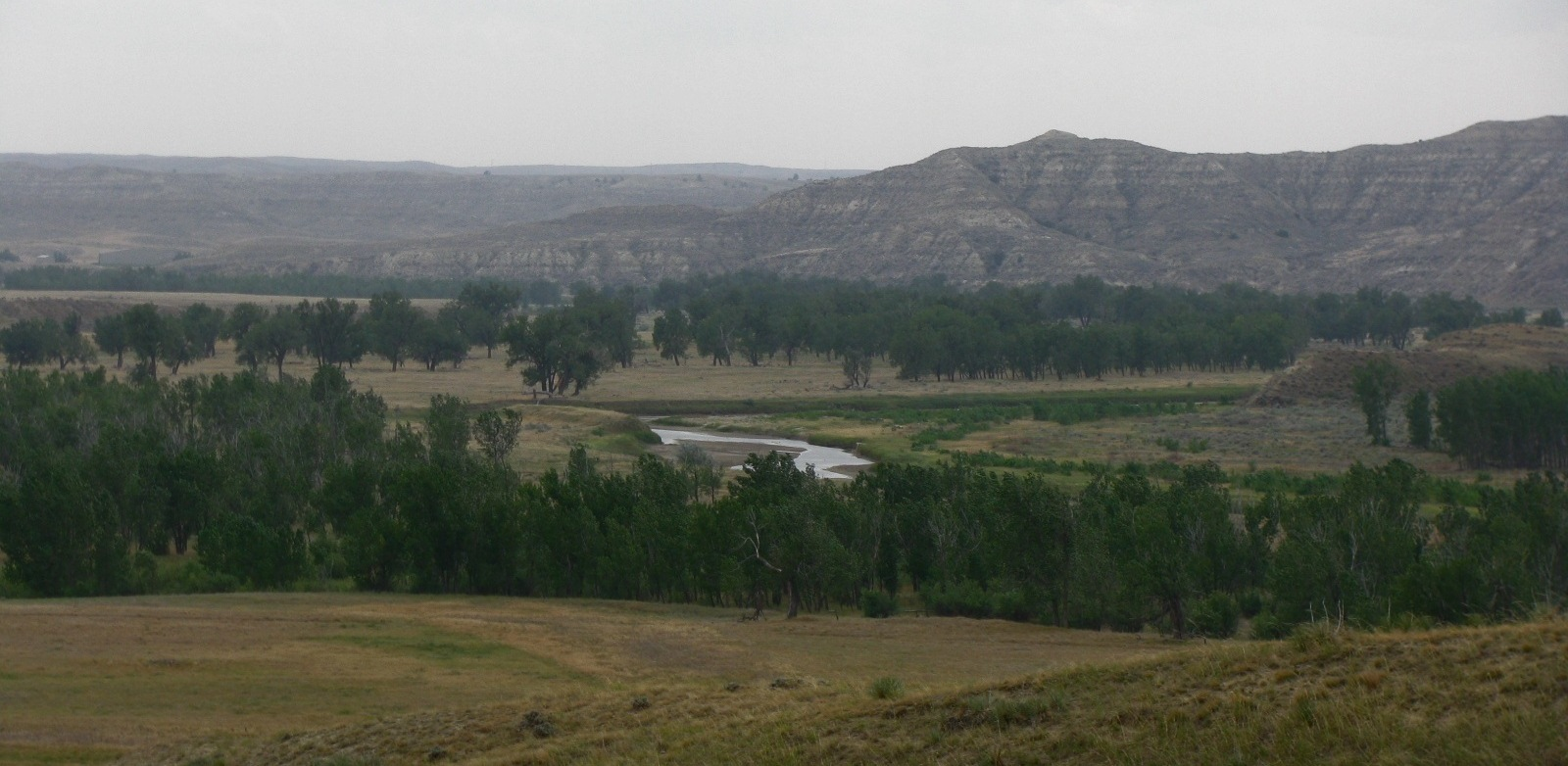
- The Powder River near the site of the massacre in what is now Johnson County, Wyoming.
Date	August 17, 1865
Location	Powder River, Dakota Territory, present-day Johnson County, Wyoming
Result	United States Victory

Belligerents
United States	Cheyenne

Commanders and leaders
(United States) Frank North	Yellow Woman †

Strength
48 Pawnee Scouts, 3 officers and 2 civilians	24 people

Casualties and losses
None	24 killed

The Powder River Massacre, part of the Powder River Expedition, occurred on August 17, 1865, and was carried out by United States soldiers and Pawnee scouts against 24 Cheyenne people. The incident occurred near the Powder River in Dakota Territory, in present-day Johnson County, Wyoming.

== The massacre ==
In August 1865, Captain Frank North, along with about 48 of his Pawnee Scouts and several other soldiers and civilians, was keeping up a vigilant search for "Hostile Indians" in Dakota Territory. For two days, the group trailed a band of Cheyenne who were heading north. The trail showed that the Cheyennes had about 35-40 horses and mules, along with one travois. At 2:00 a.m. on August 17, the Captain and his Scouts caught up with the group on the Powder River, about 60 miles north of Fort Connor. The small group of 24 Cheyennes had made their camp for the night, and were asleep. North decided to wait until dawn to attack. In the morning, Captain North's party closed in on the camp. Spotting the scouts, the Cheyenne thought the approaching Indians were not Pawnee but friendly Cheyenne, and made no hostile moves. However, the Pawnees suddenly charged in on the Cheyenne, surprising them and killing all 24, including Yellow Woman, who was the stepmother of George Bent. In the fighting, North's scouts lost 4 horses killed, but captured two stolen government saddles, a quantity of white women's and children's clothing, two U.S. Infantry coats issued by Colonel Thomas Moonlight to the Indians in the spring of 1865, and 29 horses and mules. Four of these animals had U.S. government brands showing they had recently been captured in the Battles of Red Buttes and Platte Bridge Station that had both occurred on July 26, 1865 near present-day Casper, Wyoming. One captured horse also belonged to the Overland Stage company.

== Aftermath ==
After the skirmish, Brigadier General Patrick E. Connor issued an official report on the action dated August 19, 1865. It read as follows:

Headquarters, Powder River, August 19th, 1865.

Major-General G. M. Dodge:

A detachment of my Pawnee scouts on the 16th inst. discovered and pursued a party of 24 Cheyennes returning from the mail road with scalps and plunder. They overtook them about sixty miles northeast of here on Powder River, and after a short en-gagement killed the whole party. Loss on our side, 4 horses killed. We captured 29 animals, among which were 4 Government and one overland stage line horse, besides two Government saddles and a quantity of women's and children clothing, and two of the infantry coats issued by Col. Moonlight last Spring to the Indians, who subsequently killed Capt. Fouts and four soldiers of the Seventh Iowa.

— P. Edw. Connor, Brigadier-General.

== The location ==
The estimates of where the massacre happened vary from fifty to eighty miles north of Fort Connor, according to the various diaries and reports. It most likely took place somewhere between the mouth of Crazy Woman Creek and present-day Arvada, Wyoming on the Powder River. The site of the graves of the 24 Cheyennes who were killed remains unknown.

== Order of battle ==
United States Army, Captain Frank Joshua North

- Pawnee Scouts, about 48 men.
- Unattached soldiers and civilians, about 4 men

United States	Company	Strength
United States	Pawnee Scouts, about 53 men Captain Frank J. North	Company A, Pawnee Scouts, Nebraska Cavalry, 48 men; Captain Samuel M. Robbins, 1st Colorado Cavalry, Gen. Connor's chief engineer; First Lieutenant Oscar Jewett, 1st Nevada Cavalry, Gen. Connor's aide-de-camp; Alvin C. Leighton, civilian sutler for the Powder River Expedition; Finn Burnett, civilian mule-driver and employee of Leighton

Native Americans, Yellow Woman †

- Cheyenne, 24 people

Native Americans	Tribe	Strength
Native Americans	Cheyenne Yellow Woman †	24 people
