= Donald J. Berthrong =

American historian

- Born: October 2, 1922; Kirksville, Missouri
- Died: July 30, 2012; Alexandria, Virginia
- Occupations: Historian and educational administrator
- Known for: Historical works on American Indian history, especially the history of the Southern Cheyenne

Donald J. Berthrong (October 2, 1922 – July 30, 2012) was an American historian best known for his work on American Indian history, especially the history of the Southern Cheyenne. Berthrong was a professor, professor Emeritus, and former head of the history departments at the University of Oklahoma and later Purdue University.

== Biography ==
=== Early life and education ===
Berthrong was born in La Crosse, Wisconsin, on October 2, 1922. Berthrong began his college career at the State Teachers College in La Crosse. At La Crosse, Berthrong began a liberal arts curriculum with the intention of becoming a physician. During his second year in school World War II began and Berthrong volunteered soon after for the army. It was during his time in the military that Berthrong realized that he wanted to further his education in the social sciences. He would go on to receive his Bachelor's and Master's degrees from the University of Wisconsin in 1947 and 1948 respectively. Berthrong, in an interview with Ronald McCoy in 1990 stated that, “Wisconsin had a superior group of scholars, especially in United States history--headed by scholars like Merle Curti, Merrill Jensen, Howard K. Beale--a whole group, and I was stimulated to go on for a Ph.D. So there was no break. I looked upon my undergraduate history as preparation for my Ph.D. because those who taught undergraduate courses were also the principal mentors at Wisconsin. Merle Curti accepted me as one of his students. I became involved in social and intellectual history--in those days they were woven together--and completed my Ph.D. in January 1952.” Berthrong received his Ph.D. in labor history and constitutional law.

Although Berthrong trained in social and intellectual history during his time at the University of Wisconsin, he also received an introduction to Frederick Jackson Turner and Western history under Vernon Carstensen. Due to the significant influence of “Turnerians” in Berthrong’s youth, he would be swayed to study Western history for the majority of his remaining career.

=== Academic career ===
During 1951-1952, Berthrong served as an instructor at the University of Kansas City, now the University of Missouri, Kansas City. After receiving his doctorate, he accepted a professorship at the University of Oklahoma. He remained employed at the University of Oklahoma between 1952 and 1970 as a professor and eventually served as Chair of the Department of History during his last four years. In 1970, Berthrong accepted a position as Head of the Department of History at Purdue University, a position he occupied until stepping down to resume full-time teaching duties in 1985.

=== Death ===
Donald J. Berthrong died on July 30, 2012, in Alexandria, Virginia, from pneumonia. He is buried at the Columbarium at Arlington National Cemetery next to his wife, Rhio Berthrong.

== Writings ==
Donald Berthrong's accomplishments include noteworthy and significant contributions to the history of the American West such as The Southern Cheyennes (1963) and The Cheyenne and Arapaho Ordeal: Reservation and Agency Life in the Indian Territory, 1875-1907 (1976).

Berthrong’s The Southern Cheyennes is a detailed ethnohistory of the Southern Cheyennes between 1840 and 1875. His work serves as a challenge and a supplement to George Bird Grinnell’s work, The Fighting Cheyennes. The book primarily addresses the history of the Southern Cheyenne and their relations with white, Anglo-Americans, both in trade, treaties, and military policies and actions. Other main topics discussed are the Southern Cheyennes government, their religion, and their general way of life on the Great Plains.

Berthrong’s The Cheyenne and Arapaho Ordeal: Reservation and Agency Life in the Indian Territory, 1875-1907 serves as a sequel to his book, The Southern Cheyennes. Berthrong writes that this particular book “concentrates on the struggle of the Southern Cheyennes to maintain themselves as a people during this period [the reservation period].” Beginning where Berthrong’s previous work left off, this book addresses the history of the Southern Cheyenne once they had been removed to reservations, until 1907, the year that Oklahoma officially became a state. Berthrong’s work shows the impact and significance of the United States’ government’s attempt to assimilate the Cheyenne.
