= Pawnee Scouts =

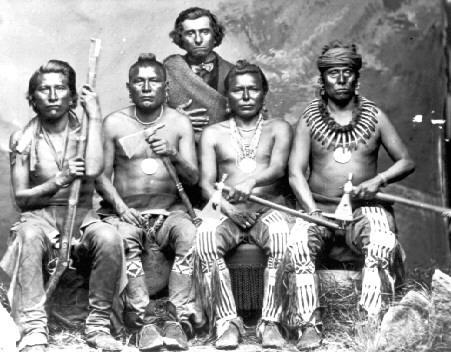
- Pawnee scouts, circa 1868 to 1871, by William Henry Jackson
- Active: 1864–1877
- Allegiance: United States of America
- Branch: United States Army
- Type: Indian scouts
- Garrison/HQ: Fort Kearny, Nebraska; Fort D.A. Russell, Wyoming
- Engagements: Powder River Expedition: Crazy Woman's Fork; Powder River; Battle of the Tongue River; Comanche War: Battle of Summit Springs; Great Sioux War

Commanders
- Notable commanders: Frank North

Pawnee Scouts were employed by the United States Army in the latter half of the 19th century. Like other groups of Indian scouts, Pawnee men were recruited in large numbers to aid in the ongoing conflicts between settlers and the Native Americans in the United States. Because the Pawnee people were at war with the Sioux and Cheyenne and had been under constant pressure and aggression by those tribes, some of them were more than willing to serve with the army for pay. A number of Pawnee served between 1864 and 1871. They were armed with rifles, revolvers and were issued scout uniforms.

== Service history ==
=== Powder River War ===
The Pawnee tribe originally came from an area in Nebraska around the Republican, Platte and Loup Rivers. Prior to December 1864, when the scouts were established, the Pawnee frequently skirmished with neighboring tribes. When General Samuel Ryan Curtis began recruiting for scouts to help him in an offensive against other tribes in the region, he convinced seventy Pawnee to join him. Shortly thereafter, First Lieutenant Frank North was authorized to recruit 100 more Pawnee. North would eventually be put in command of the scouts and promoted to captain and then major, a position he held until the final disbandment of the unit in 1877.

The first Pawnee scouts were posted at Fort Kearny, Nebraska and later units served at Fort D.A. Russell, Wyoming and at Sydney Barracks. From May to November, the Pawnee scouts were in General Patrick E. Connor's Powder River Expedition and first saw action on August 13, 1865, at Crazy Woman's Fork of the Powder River. Their second skirmish on August 16, 1865, also at Powder River. Captain North was following the trail of about 27 retreating Cheyenne with about forty-five of his scouts when they discovered the Cheyenne camp. During the following attack by North's forces, all twenty-seven Southern Cheyenne men, women, and children were killed by Captain North and his Scouts who only suffered four horses killed.

The scouts served in the Battle of the Tongue River on August 29. In the fight, about 200 United States soldiers and 70 Indian Scouts (including 30 of the Pawnee) captured an Arapaho village containing about 500 people, mostly women and children, under Medicine Man. The few Arapaho warriors counterattacked but were repulsed by the soldiers' repeating carbine's and mountain howitzer's fire. Sixty-three Arapahos, mostly unarmed noncombatants were killed. Eighteen women and children were captured and later released. Hundreds of Arapaho horses and ponies were shot after the battle. Five U.S. soldiers and Indian Scouts were killed or mortally wounded and an additional two were wounded in the battle.

=== Cheyenne War ===
In the spring of 1866, after the expedition into the Powder River Country, the Pawnee scouts were temporarily disbanded. In March 1867 Major North was authorized to enlist four, fifty-man companies of scouts for protecting the Union Pacific Railroad, then under construction. During this time, Major North was accompanied by his brother, Luther, who was in command of one of the scout companies. The "Pawnee Battalion", as it was called, was active in the Comanche War, fighting against Chief Turkey Leg and his band of Northern Cheyenne. A "severe" engagement took place near Plum Creek Station, Nebraska, on August 22, in which Major North and forty-two of the scouts engaged 150 Oglala Lakota and Cheyenne warriors who had destroyed a train on August 6, killing seven settlers and taking a large amount of private property. The Pawnee scouts killed "many", and captured Turkey Leg's wife and child. The chief's family was later exchanged for three captured American girls and two boys who were held by Turkey Leg for a long time. In the autumn of 1867 the battalion was mustered out but in the spring of 1868 North reorganized the unit to continue protecting the Union Pacific. In 1869, North and fifty scouts guided Colonel Eugene Asa Carr's Republican River Expedition through Colorado and fought in the Battle of Summit Springs on July 11. The battle put approximately 300 Americans and Pawnees up against 450 to 900 encamped Arapaho, Sioux and Cheyenne under the command of Chief Tall Bull. Carr positioned his forces so as to attack the camp simultaneously from three sides. Thirty-five native men, women and children were killed, including Tall Bull, while only one American was wounded. The scouts were responsible for the deaths of at least seven women and children. Some 800 heads of captured livestock were also taken by the US Army.

=== Great Sioux War ===
In 1870 the Pawnee scouts were still working to protect the railroad but eventually they were disbanded. With the outbreak of the Great Sioux War in 1876, Major North was ordered by General Philip Sheridan to travel to Indian Territory, where the Pawnee now lived, to organize another company for General George Crook's Little Bighorn Campaign. Living in poverty, the Pawnee men were willing to enlist for pay. North recruited 100 of the Pawnees and headed back north, to Fort Robinson, Nebraska where the Sioux chiefs Sitting Bull and Red Cloud were active in fighting the army. Major North and his men arrived at the fort on October 22 and immediately thereafter began a march to the camp of Chief Red Cloud with a regiment of cavalry. On the following morning, North's command advanced on the camp and took it, capturing Red Cloud and over 700 ponies which were later sold. The chief and his band were then marched to Fort Robinson and imprisoned there until the end of the war in 1877. In November, 1876, General Ranald S. Mackenzie led seventy Pawnee scouts and 800 cavalrymen into the Big Horn Mountains to attack a "well concealed" Cheyenne camp. When General Mackenzie launched his attack most fled, leaving their provisions and lodges to be piled up and burnt by the soldiers. Some 650 ponies were also captured and over forty natives died from exposure or starvation in the following weeks. The attack left the Cheyenne destitute.

With nowhere to go, some of the Cheyenne walked to Fort Robinson and surrendered. Now that the war was over, the Pawnee scouts were disbanded for good on May 1, 1877, and returned to the Indian Territory. Major North retired from his military life the same year.

== See also ==
- Apache Scouts
- Arikara scouts
- Navajo Scouts
- Crow Scouts
- Black Seminole Scouts
