= Sihasapa =

Grouping within the Lakota people

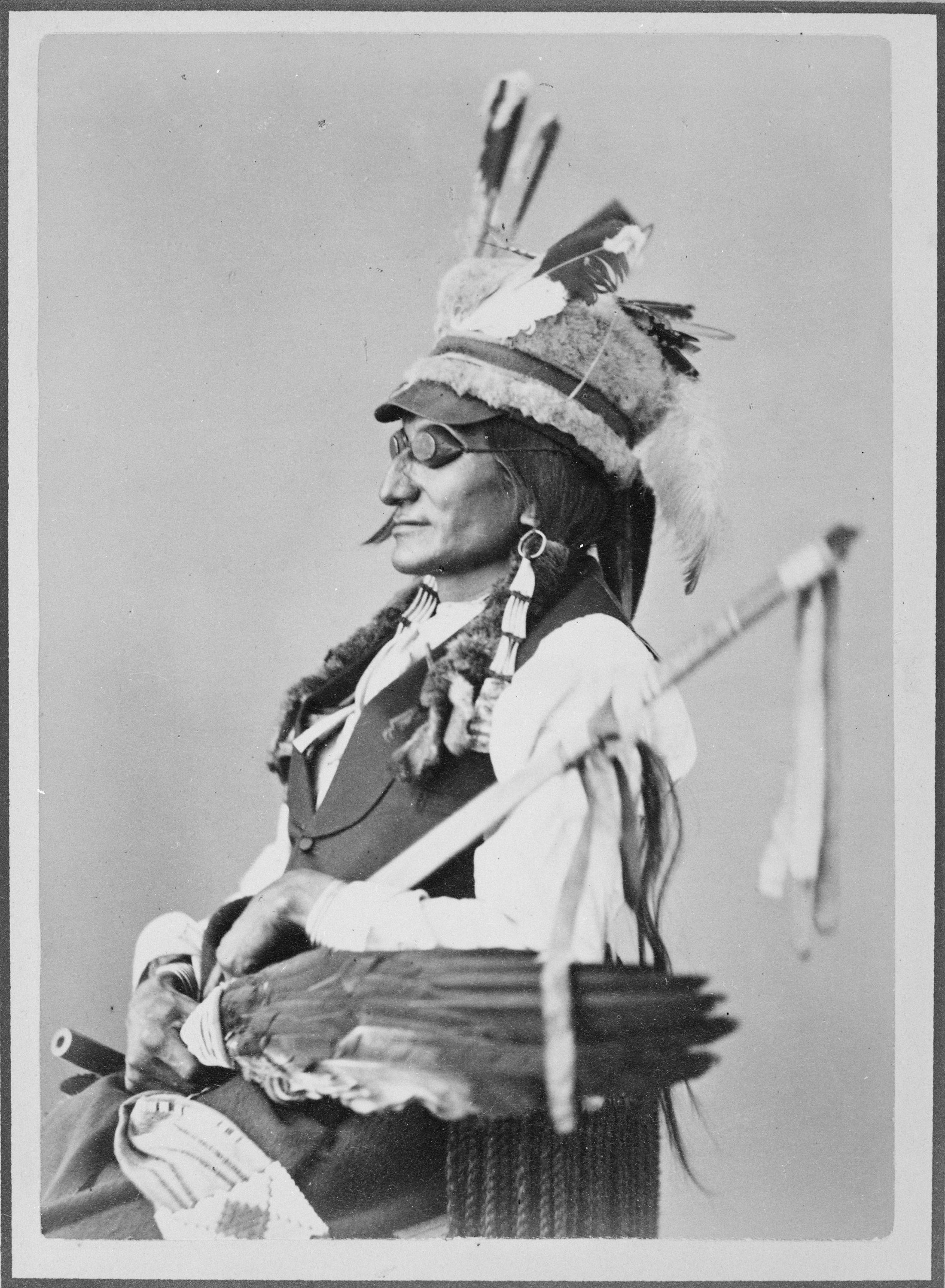
Sitting Crow/Kangi Iyotanke (Kah-Re-Eo-Tah-Ke), a Sihásapa Lakota man from Standing Rock

The Sihásapa or Blackfoot Sioux are a division of the Lakota people, Titonwan, or Teton.

Sihásapa is the Lakota word for "Blackfoot", whereas Siksiká has the same meaning in the Nitsitapi language, and, together with the Kainai and the Piikani forms the Nitsitapi Confederacy. As a result, the Sihásapa have the same English name as the Blackfoot Confederacy (correctly: Nitsitapi Confederacy), and the nations are sometimes confused with one another.

The Sihásapa lived in the western Dakotas on the Great Plains, and consequently are among the Plains Indians. Their official residence today is the Standing Rock Reservation in North and South Dakota and the Cheyenne River Reservation in South Dakota, home also to the Itazipco (No Bows), the Minneconjou (People Who Live Near Water) and Oohenumpa (Two Kettle), all bands of the Lakota.

== Historic Sihásapa thiyóšpaye or Bands ==
In 1880, John Grass provided a list of the bands (tiyóšpaye) of the Sihasapa:

- Sihasapa-Hkcha or Sihasapa qtca ("Real Blackfoot")
- Kangi-shun Pegnake or Kanxicu pegnake ("Crow Feather Hair Ornaments" or "Wear raven feathers in their hair")
- Glaglahecha or Glagla heca ("Slovenly", "untidy" or "Too lazy to tie their moccasins")
- Wazhazha or Wajaje ("Osage"), Kill Eagle's Band
- Hohe ("Rebels, i.e. Assiniboine")
- Wamnuga Owin or Wamnugaoin ("Cowrie-Shell Earrings" or "Shell ear ornaments or Pendants")

== Famous Sihásapa ==
- Cante Peta 'Fire Heart'
- Mahto Eennahpa 'White Bear'
- Magashapa 'Goose'
- Pezi 'Grass'
- Mahto Wakouah 'Charging Bear' alias Okihe Pezi 'Young Grass' alias 'John Grass'
- Wambli Kte 'Kill Eagle'
- Hohay
