= Frank North =

American military officer and interpreter

Frank Joshua North
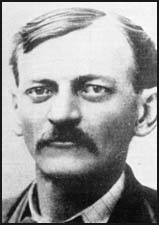
- Born: March 10, 1840; Manhattan, New York, U.S.
- Died: March 15, 1885 (aged 45); Columbus, Nebraska, U.S.
- Burial place: Columbus Cemetery, Columbus, Nebraska
- Military career
- Allegiance: United States of America
- Branch: United States Army
- Service years: 1864–1877
- Rank: Major (USA)
- Commands: Pawnee Scouts
- Conflicts: Indian Wars; Powder River Expedition; Crazy Woman's Fork; Powder River Massacre; Tongue River; Comanche War; Summit Springs
- Other work: Politician

Frank Joshua North (10 March 1840 – 15 March 1885) was an American military officer and interpreter for the United States Army, and also a politician. He is most well known for organizing and leading the Pawnee Scouts from 1865 to 1877 during the American Indian Wars. His brother Luther H. North also led the Scouts.

== Early life ==
Frank Joshua North was born in Manhattan, New York, on March 10, 1840. He had an older brother, James E. North, born in Ohio, where their parents Thomas J. and Jane E. North had moved from their native Tompkins County, New York. His parents returned to Ohio, where his brother Luther H. North was born, followed by two younger sisters. In 1856, at the age of 16, Frank moved to Nebraska and worked as a transporter, moving goods between Omaha and Fort Kearny. During this time, North made contact with the Pawnee Indians, befriending them and learning the Pawnee language. In 1860, North was working as a clerk and interpreter at the Pawnee Agency trading post in Genoa, Nebraska.

== Military ==
In 1864, Major General Samuel R. Curtis approached North to have him organize a company of Pawnee scouts to serve in the Union Army. In 1865, he organized Company A of the Pawnee Scouts, and was appointed the rank of first lieutenant and then captain. While commanding the scouts, Captain North fought at Crazy Woman's Fork, participated in the Powder River Massacre, and fought in the Battle of the Tongue River, all of which took place in August 1865 in the Dakota Territory. On July 11, 1869, he fought with his scouts at the Battle of Summit Springs in the Colorado Territory. After the battle, North claimed to have shot and killed the Cheyenne chief Tall Bull. He also participated in the Dull Knife Fight on November 25, 1876. North was promoted to the rank of major and mustered out of the Army in 1877.

== Later life ==
Frank North served one term in the Nebraska State Legislature from 1871 to 1872. He then became a ranching partner with William F. Cody in a cattle ranch in western Nebraska on the Dismal River. He disposed of his interest in 1882, and then joined Buffalo Bill's Wild West show as manager of the American Indians.

North sustained serious injuries (including seven broken ribs) in a horse accident in Hartford, Connecticut in 1884. As a result of his injuries and the following illness, Frank Joshua North died on March 15, 1885, in Columbus, Platte County, Nebraska. In 1958, he was inducted into the Hall of Great Westerners of the National Cowboy & Western Heritage Museum.
