= Tall Bull =

Cheyenne chief

- Hotóa'ôxháa'êstaestse

Chief of the Cheyenne Dog Soldiers leader

Personal details
- Born: c. 1830
- Died: July 11, 1869
- Cause of death: Killed in the Battle of Summit Springs

Tall Bull (Cheyenne: Hotóa'ôxháa'êstaestse; c. 1830 – July 11, 1869) was a chief of the Cheyenne Dog Soldiers. Of Cheyenne and Lakota parentage, like some of the other Dog Soldiers by that time, he identified as Cheyenne.

He was shot and killed in the Battle of Summit Springs in Colorado by Buffalo Wild Bill Cody leader of the Pawnee Scouts.

== Leadership ==
Tall Bull was a major Southern Cheyenne Chief, war chief and Dog Soldier leader. In 1864, under his leadership he had approximately 500 people following him in the eastern Colorado and western Kansas and Nebraska area. He participated in the 1864-65 Arapaho-Cheyenne War, the retaliation that followed the Sand Creek massacre, but gave up the fight after seeing the futility of winning the war. In 1868, he participated in the Battle of Beecher Island. During the battle he warned Roman Nose not to go into battle until he fixed his broken medicine and to do it quickly so that he could join the fight. During 1869, Tall Bull was shot dead, during an ambush by Maj Frank North at the Battle of Summit Springs.

At a peace council in 1867 he argued that the whites and the soldiers should stop making war upon the Cheyenne by invading the Cheyenne land and instigating further calamities. Furthermore, they should stop telling the Cheyenne that they should give up their land to have peace. Their Indian agent Edward Wynkoop tried bartering a peace with direct tones that were none too conciliatory. During one peace talk Tall Bull personally stopped the great Cheyenne warrior Roman Nose from killing Gen. Winfield Hancock.

Tall Bull was killed in the Battle of Summit Springs on 11 July 1869. Not even a year had passed after the death of his fellow Dog Soldier, the great Roman Nose, on September 17, 1868. Also dead was Chief Black Kettle. The war societies were devastated due to their loss of leadership. The Cheyenne never recovered and were no longer a threat on the southern Great Plains.

== Wolf song ==
Wolf songs were a type of song sung alone by male Cheyenne scouts. Several of those written by Tall Bull survive. An example is as follows:

Nāh mē ōn, nā; ni nist'?
My love, it is I (who am singing); do you hear me?

== See also ==
- Council of Forty-Four
