= Townsend Wagon Train Fight =

The Townsend Wagon Train Fight occurred on the Bozeman Trail near the Powder River and present day Kaycee, Wyoming on July 7, 1864. This wagon train consisted mainly of emigrants from Wisconsin, Illinois and Iowa who were heading to the gold rush area of Virginia City, Montana. The emigrants were attacked by Native Americans who were upset that they were entering their hunting lands. Led by Captain Absalom Austin Townsend the wagon train was one of the largest ever assembled with over 400 people and 150+ wagons. The Bozeman Trail was started by John Bozeman in 1863 as a short cut from the Oregon Trail to the gold fields of SW Montana. Bozeman led the first wagon train of the year in 1864 and the Townsend Wagon Train was the third such train down the trail.

Montana PBS produced a 90-minute documentary called The Bozeman Trail which aired in March 2019. The documentary details the history of the trail including information on the Townsend Wagon Train Fight and other battles which led to the U.S. Government establishing the Powder River Expedition in 1865. Several forts were built along the Bozeman including Fort Reno (1865), Fort Phil Kearny (1866), Fort C. F. Smith (1866), Fort Ellis (1867) and staffed by the U.S. Cavalry. The establishment of these forts culminated in Red Cloud's War from 1866 - 1868.
