= Crazy Woman Crossing =

- Trabing Station–Crazy Woman Crossing
- U.S. National Register of Historic Places
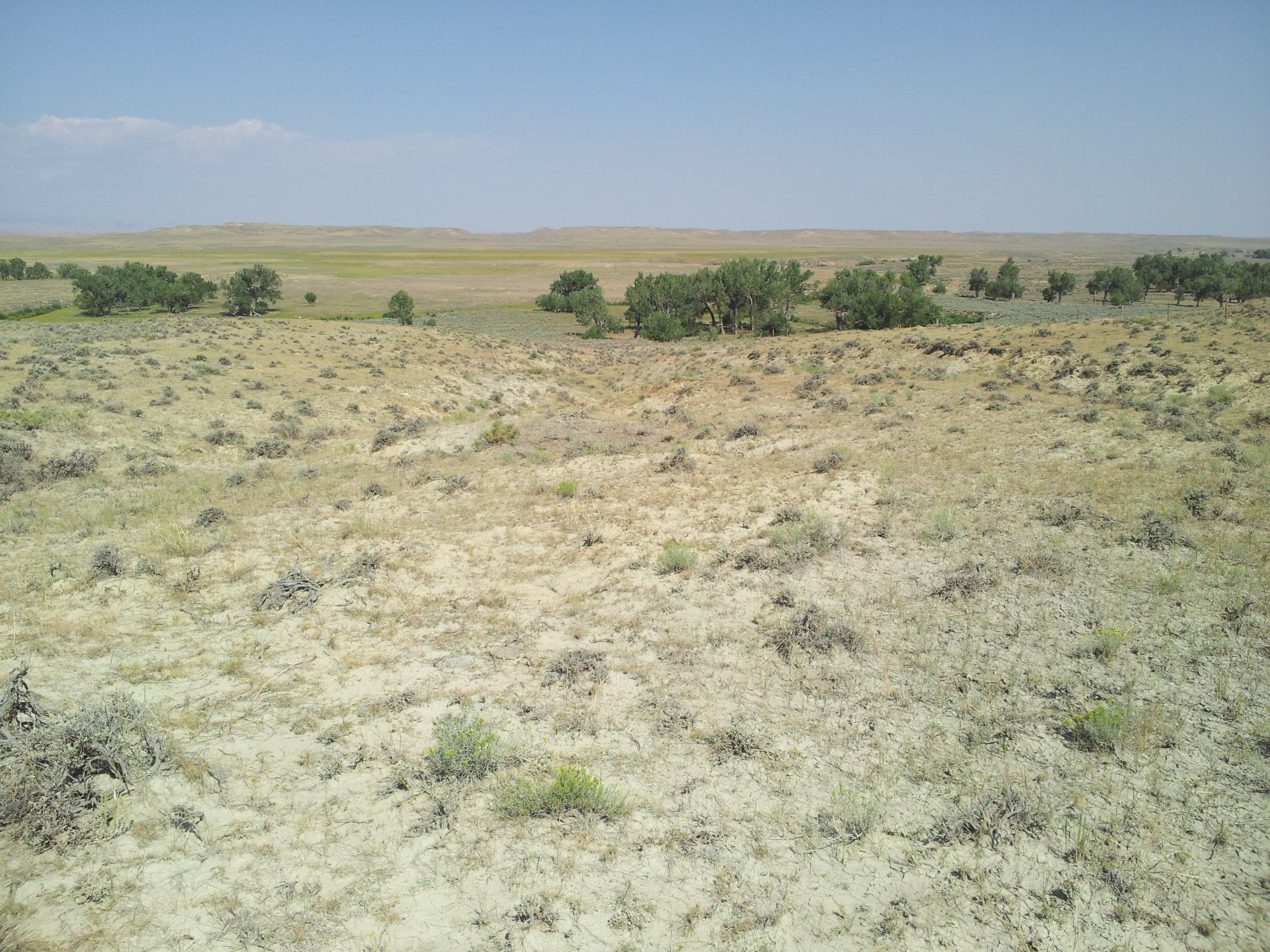
- Crazy Woman Crossing on Bozeman Trail
- Nearest city: Buffalo, Wyoming
- Area: 676 acres (274 ha)
- Built: 1866
- MPS: Bozeman Trail in Wyoming MPS
- NRHP reference No.: 89000815
- Added to NRHP: July 23, 1989

Crazy Woman Crossing is a historic place on the Bozeman Trail, in Johnson County, Wyoming, United States, about 20 miles southeast of Buffalo. Crazy Woman Crossing was one of three major fords used by travelers across creeks and rivers in this area. It is significant as the site of the Battle of Crazy Woman, a skirmish during Red Cloud's War in 1866. The United States pulled out of this territory after negotiation with the Lakota and allies of the Treaty of Fort Laramie of 1868.

In the 1870s, the US attempted to claim some control of the Bozeman Trail, and the number of emigrants increased on this route. In 1878, August Trabing opened a store nearby to serve travelers on the trail, which came to be known as the Trabing Station. His was the first store in Johnson County. Crazy Woman Crossing became known as the place where what became known as Trabing Road crosses Crazy Woman Creek.

== Bozeman Trail ==
In the spring 1863, John Bozeman and his associates scouted for a direct route from the goldfields at Virginia City, Montana to central Wyoming in order to connect with the Oregon Trail, which was then the major passage in the continental United States to the West Coast. The Bozeman Trail followed many north–south trails which the American Indians had used since prehistoric times to travel through Powder River country. On July 6, 1863, 46 wagons, 89 men and an unspecified number of women and children crossed the North Platte at Deer Creek (present-day Glenrock, Wyoming) and became the first wagon train to try the new trail.

After travelers crossed the North Platte River, the first three major river crossings on the Bozeman Trail were Powder River Crossing, Crazy Woman Crossing, and Clear Creek Crossing (present-day Buffalo, Wyoming). At each water ford, travelers would often camp at least one night, to water their stock, review and renew supplies, and collect themselves.

Between 1864 and 1868, the high risk of Lakota and allied attacks resulted in fewer than a thousand people using the Bozeman Trail. One Bozeman Trail emigrant was Ellen Fletcher. She recorded a series of diary and notes which described her experiences on trail during the summer of 1866. She wrote of the Crazy Woman Crossing:

Camped at "Crazy Woman's Fork." It was a beautiful spot near the stream, in a large grove of trees. The men built large campfires all around the wagons. It was a pretty sight, the circular correll (corral) of white topped wagons and tents scattered here and there, the blazing fires shining forth through the trees, the busy men and women hurrying to and fro, and the quiet moon looking down over it all. A large tree, bent over like an arch, crowns our wagon.

== Crazy Woman Battle ==
The Powder River Expedition (1865) and Red Cloud's War (1866) were United States military actions intended to suppress resistance by the Lakota, Northern Cheyenne and Arapaho in the region and protect travelers on the Bozeman Trail from attacks. On August 11, 1865, General Patrick Edward Connor's troops reached the Powder River Crossing, where they began building Fort Reno. After the Battle of the Tongue River on August 29, 1865, Connor was ordered to return to Salt Lake City. At about the same time, another group of soldiers under Colonel James Sawyer were ordered to build a military road for freighting supplies along the Bozeman Trail.

In 1866, a military force under Colonel Henry B. Carrington was ordered to secure the route of the Bozeman Trail. Carrington established Fort Phil Kearny on July 14, initiating a military struggle by the Lakota and their allies in the area known as Red Cloud's War. The Lakota struggled to expel US forces. The Crazy Woman Crossing, a ford across Crazy Woman Creek, was one of the Indians' favorite spots for attack, as its terrain was amenable to ambush. On July 20, 1866, a group of 30 men and women settlers, led by Lieutenant A. H. Wand, left Fort Reno to travel to Fort Phil Kearny.

Lieutenants Napoleon H. Daniels and George H. Templeton rode ahead to look for a suitable campsite at Crazy Woman Crossing. Unable to locate a suitable place, they turned back to join the larger group. Lieutenant Templeton described what happened next:

"Lieut. (Daniels) remarked "look there" and spurred his horse up, going way ahead. I looked over my right shoulder but could see nothing, but upon looking over my left, I saw between 50 and 60 Indians mounted and in full chase about 150 yards in the rear. I spurred up old Pegasus, punched his (flank) with my gun and did everything to increase speed, but the horse seemed to me to be moving very slowly. After Mr. Daniels had gone 200 yards he was shot with an arrow through the back and fell off his horse, the saddle turning. I could do nothing to help him and did not expect to get away myself."

Templeton, hotly pursued, reached the wagon train, which formed a defensive corral on a bluff overlooking Crazy Woman Creek. The battle continued for several hours, until a cavalry patrol traveling from Fort Phil Kearny to Fort Reno, under Captain George Burroughs' command, relieved the beleaguered party. During the fight, a second soldier, Lance Corporal Terrence Callary, was killed near the corralled wagons. The Americans' total casualties were two killed and several wounded.

Red Cloud's War was decisive with U.S. forces withdrawing. Two years later, the United States negotiated the Fort Laramie Treaty of 1868, ceding control of some territory to the Lakota and allies. This being the only treaty where the government accepted all terms offered by the Lakota and its allies. The army abandoned the Bozeman Trail, along with three forts in the Powder River country.

== Trading Station ==
As a result of the Great Sioux War of 1876, American armed forces reclaimed the Bozeman Trail and established a series of forts (Cantonment Reno, Fort McKinney, and Fort Custer). The Bozeman Trail was developed by the United States as a military road and telegraph route to serve these forts. Within a few years, several stage coach lines were established that hauled freight and passengers along the trail.

In 1878, August Trabing established a trading post at the Crazy Woman Crossing. Trabing sold various goods including boots, hats, and liquor to local ranchers and travelers on the Bozeman Trail. In the fall of 1878, the store was robbed three times by a gang of about eight "road agents." Because of these robberies, Trabing moved his store in 1879 from the Crazy Woman Crossing to the Clear Creek Crossing (present day Buffalo, Wyoming).

After Trabing left Crazy Woman Crossing, his building was used as a post office for ranchers and stockmen, and a stage station for the stagecoach lines. Local people described the Trabing building as a long, log structure paralleling the road, with three rooms. At the south end of the building were two small log outbuildings, one a schoolhouse, the other a blacksmith shop. To the east was another large log building served as the stable, with several corrals for livestock.

According to Post Office records, Trabing City was established as a post office on January 20, 1879, with Abraham M. Baumann as postmaster. The post office was renamed Trabing and Andrew King was named as postmaster on August 26, 1880. The Trabing post office closed on December 13, 1913, and mail service was moved to Buffalo.

== Photo gallery ==
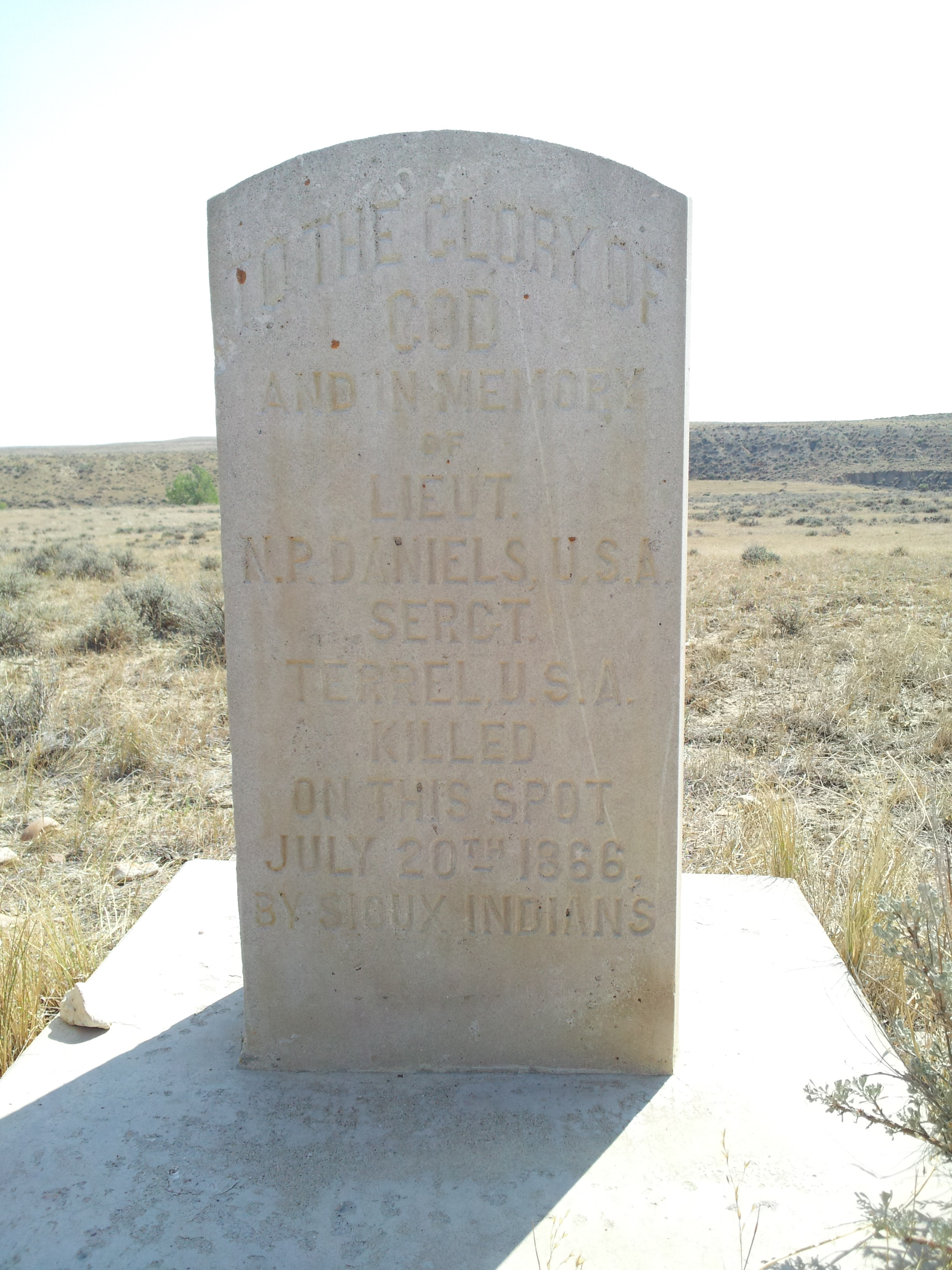
Crazy Woman Battle Monument

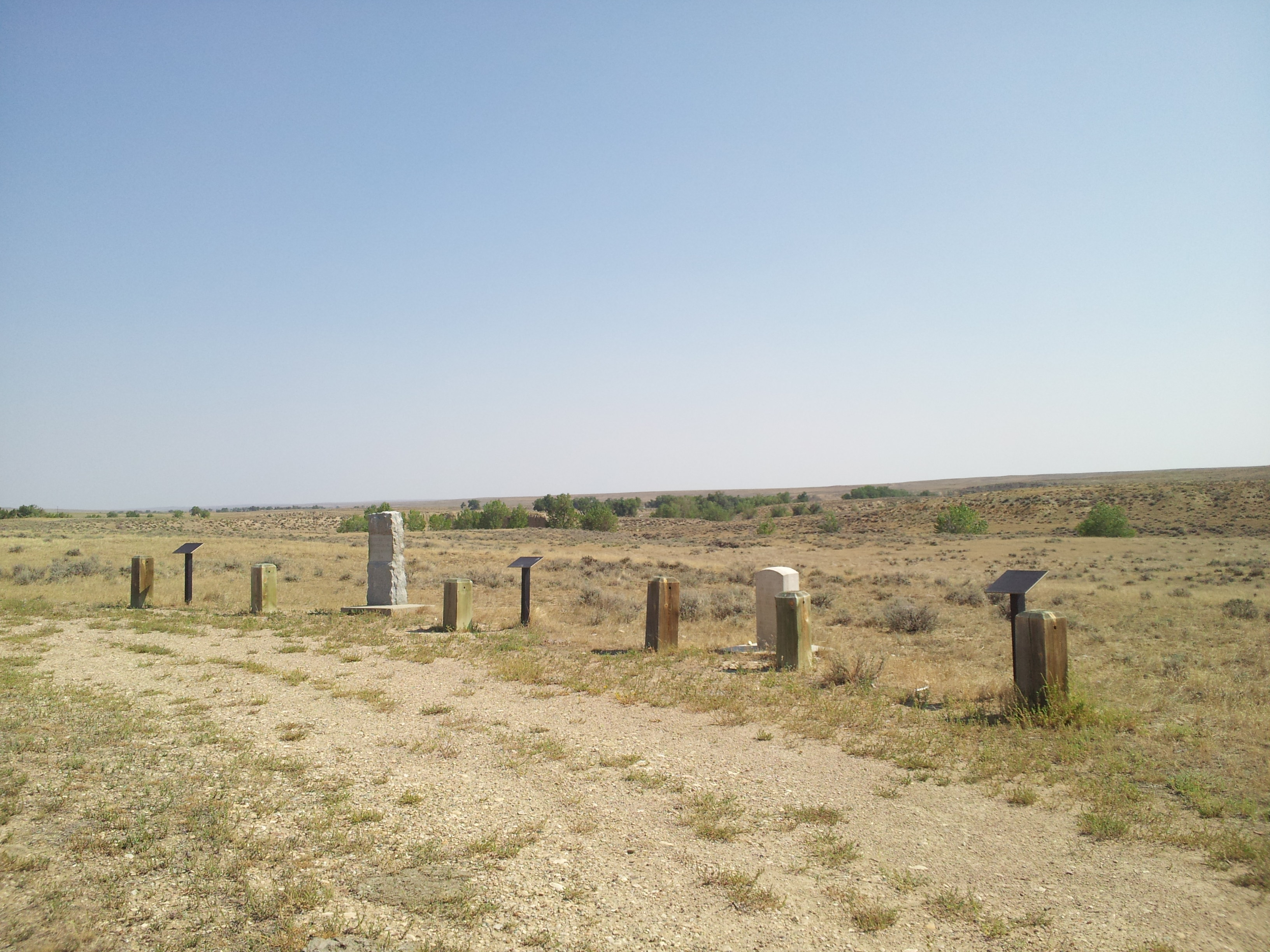
Monuments for Crazy Woman Battle

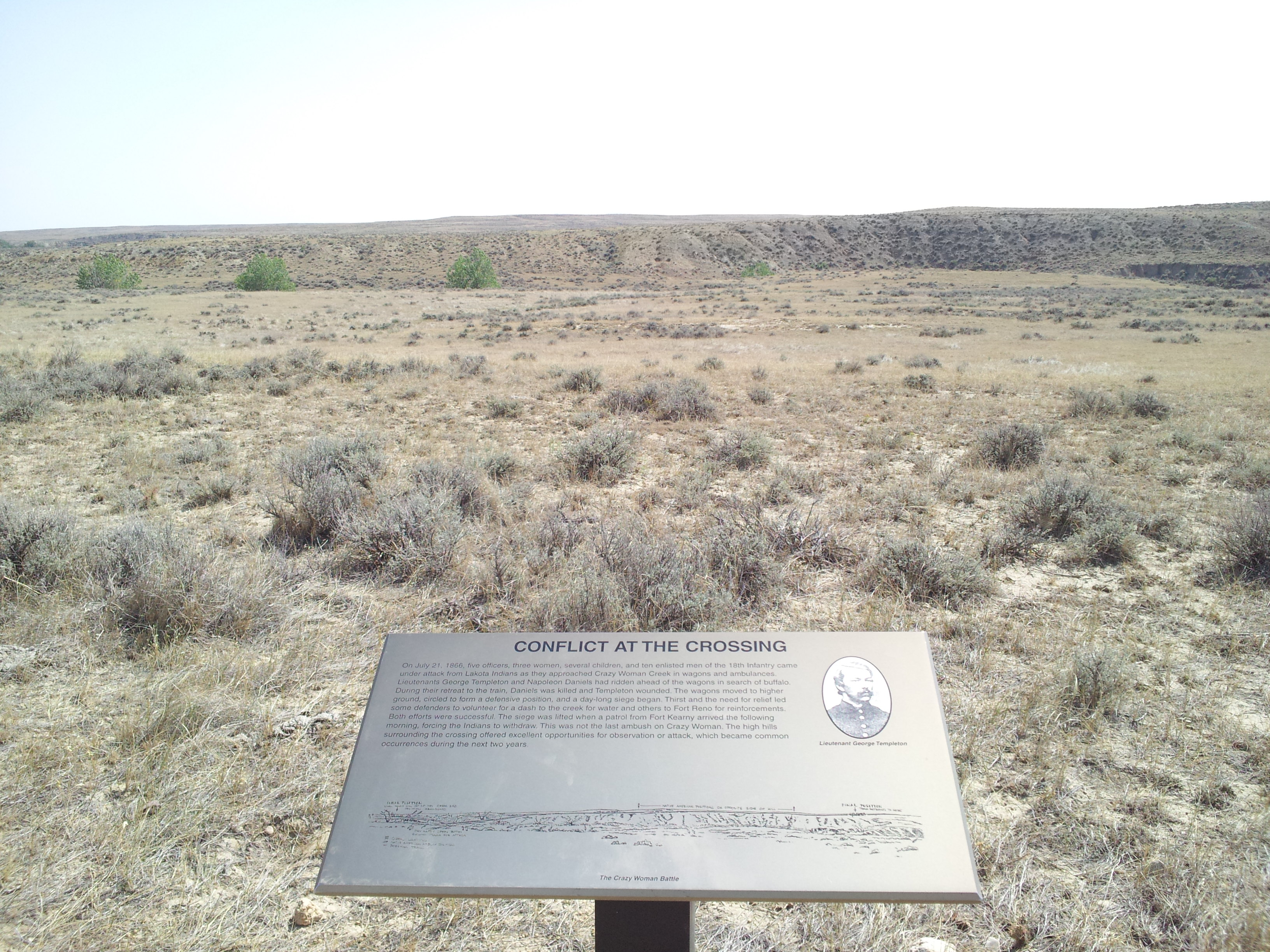
Site of the Crazy Woman Battle

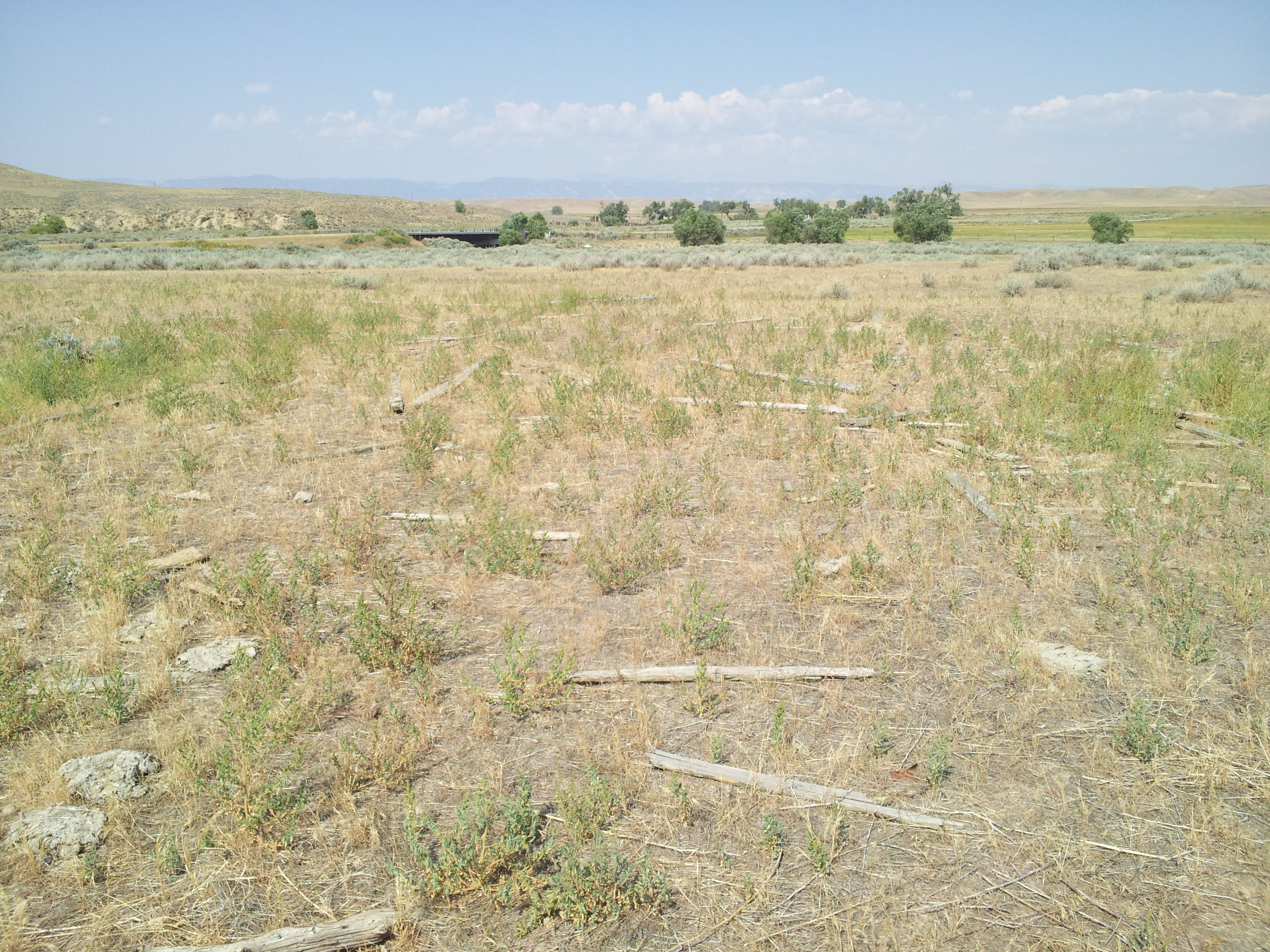
Ruins of Trabing Store
