= A. A. Townsend =

Wisconsin and California pioneer

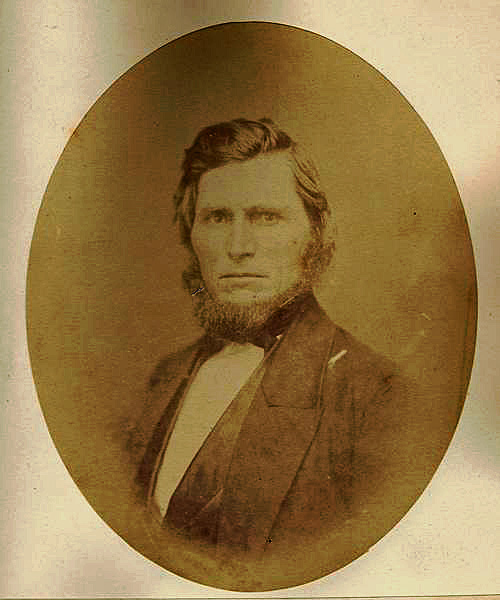
- Absalom Townsend, 1855 – photographer unknown

Member of the Wisconsin State Assembly from the Lafayette 2nd district
- In office January 1, 1855 – January 7, 1856
- Preceded by: James H. Knowlton
- Succeeded by: Hamilton H. Gray

Personal details
- Born: December 7, 1810 Sussex County, New Jersey, U.S.
- Died: April 28, 1888 (aged 77) Lafayette County, Wisconsin, U.S.
- Resting place: Evergreen Cemetery, Shullsburg, Wisconsin
- Party: Republican
- Spouses: Mary Ann Ross (m. 1836; died 1842); Julia Almira Wells (m. 1844; died 1877); Charlotte Warne (m. 1880–1888)
- Children: with Mary Ann Ross; Sarah (King)^{(b. 1837; died 1897)}; Addison A. Townsend^{(b. 1838; died 1926)}; Virginia (Penwell)^{(b. 1840; died 1922)}; Susan^{(b. 1842; died 1843)}; with Julia Wells; Edwin Townsend^{(b. 1845; died 1930)}; Ellen (Champion)^{(b. 1847; died 1924)}; Walter Best Townsend^{(b. 1848; died 1921)}

Military service
- Allegiance: United States
- Branch/service: Michigan Territory Militia
- Years of service: 1832
- Battles/wars: Black Hawk War: Battle of Bad Axe

Absalom Austin Townsend (December 7, 1810 – April 28, 1888) was an American miner and prospector. He was a pioneer of the Wisconsin lead-mining region and the California gold rush.

== Early years ==
Townsend, third son of Samuel and Sarah (Longwell) Townsend, was born in Sussex County, New Jersey in 1810. When he was two years old, his father moved to Steuben County, New York, where he resided till 1826. His father, now a widower, having purchased some military land in Western Illinois, started on October 15, 1826, with his eldest son, and Absalom, and arrived at Fort Clark (now Peoria, Illinois), on January 1, 1827. In mid-February 1827, they arrived at the lead mines in the vicinity of Gratiot's Grove, near present-day Shullsburg, Wisconsin, and engaged in the business of mining. They were soon interrupted by the Black Hawk War in 1832. The elder brother volunteered in William S. Hamilton's company, while Townsend and his father forted at Gratiot's Grove, with Townsend serving under Gen. Zachary Taylor ("Old Rough & Ready"). He served during the whole of the Black Hawk War (1832) as a volunteer, under Col. Henry Dodge, and participated in the Battle of Bad Axe on August 2, 1832. After the war was over, Townsend returned to mining.

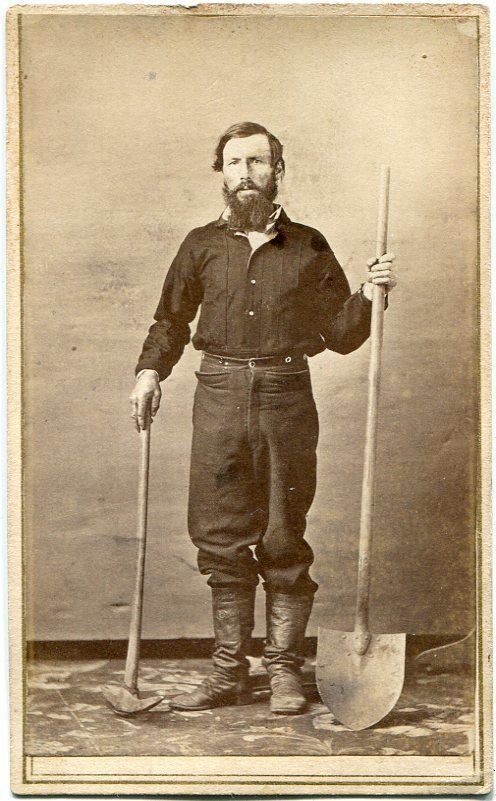
Absalom Townsend during California Gold Rush (circa 1850-51) - photographer unknown.

== Biography ==
In 1836, he married, and settled on a farm near Shullsburg, Wisconsin. With news of the California Gold Rush, Townsend resolved to try his hand at mining in that region. He fitted out a train of twelve wagons, drawn by oxen, with a company of men, in the spring of 1849, and taking the land route, started on April 16, and arrived in California on September 9. The "Rough and Ready Company" under Captain "Cappy" Townsend, composed of nine men from Shullsburg, arrived by the Truckee route at a point on Deer Creek, near the mouth of Slate Creek. The company styled themselves the "Rough and Ready Company" in honor of Townsend, who had served under Taylor ("Old Rough & Ready"). From this company, the California town of Rough and Ready derived its name. A 1958 episode of the Death Valley Days TV series called, "Rough and Ready", reenacts their arrival and founding of the town.

Consequent prospecting by Townsend's company satisfied them that the newfound diggings were rich, and removing their camp, they prepared winter quarters by building two log cabins on the point of the hill east from and overlooking the present town of Rough and Ready. At the end of February 1850, Townsend took out over $40,000 (another source states $15,000), before the water failed in the spring—no ditches then conveyed water from any large stream to the smaller ones, or to dry ravines. Townsend then returned by steamer route via San Francisco, Panama, New Orleans to Galena, IL, arriving 26 April 1850.

Townsend fitted out a company of 32 men on his second trip to the gold fields, well supplied with horses and mules. They left Shullsburg on the land route on May 23, 1850, crossed the Missouri River at Omaha, Nebraska, arriving September 8 (or 10), 1850. Townsend was astonished to find a town at Rough and Ready, containing some 400-500 inhabitants, instead of just his two cabins. He had to "buy into a claim" to get a place to work himself. While in Nevada County, he pursued the business of mining and stock keeping. He returned to Shullsburg in the spring of 1851.

Townsend held various public offices in Shullsburg and Lafayette County, Wisconsin. He acted as one of the arbitrators in settling the claims of the miners, preparatory to the sale of the Wisconsin mineral lands by the General Government. In 1842, he was commissioned a Justice of the Peace by Governor James Duane Doty; and in 1855, he represented his district in the Wisconsin State Assembly.

In 1864, Townsend led a large wagon train of individuals from Wisconsin, Illinois and Iowa to the gold areas of Montana. Known as the "Townsend Wagon Train", it consisted of 150 wagons and over 400 people. They used the same Oregon Trail he had traveled in his 1849 and 1850 trips to California but in Wyoming they took an offshoot of the trail on to the Bozeman Trail which had been mapped by John Bozeman in 1863. The Townsend Wagon Train was only the 3rd such train on the Bozeman Trail and was attacked by Native Americans on July 7, 1864 near the Powder River in Wyoming. Several deaths occurred on both sides of the battle. The Wagon Train eventually reached its destination of Virginia City, Montana, on August 25, 1864, according to the trail diary of Benjamin W. Ryan, a member of the wagon train.

== Personal life ==
With his first wife, Mary Ann Ross, there were four children, including Addison and Virginia. She died in 1842 at the age of 29 and is buried in Shullsburg. He married his second wife, Julia Almira Wells (1827–1877), in 1844; they had two sons and one daughter, Edwin, Walter, and Ellen. Julia Almira is buried next to Absalom in Evergreen Cemetery, Shullsburg. Townsend married Charlotte Warne in Jo Daviess County, IL in August 1880. Townsend was a member of the Presbyterian Church, and in political views, he was a Republican. Townsend was active in the work of the Masonic fraternity. He owned several tracts of land (over 800 acres in total) west and south of Shullsburg which he farmed and owned the mineral rights. His death occurred in 1888 and he is buried in Evergreen Cemetery, Shullsburg, Wisconsin.

== Popular Culture ==
A song titled "Rough & Ready" was written and recorded by Bill Paulsen in 2025. It details the life journey from New York to Wisconsin and then to the gold rushes in California and Montana.
