= Bozeman Pass =

Mountain pass in Montana, United States

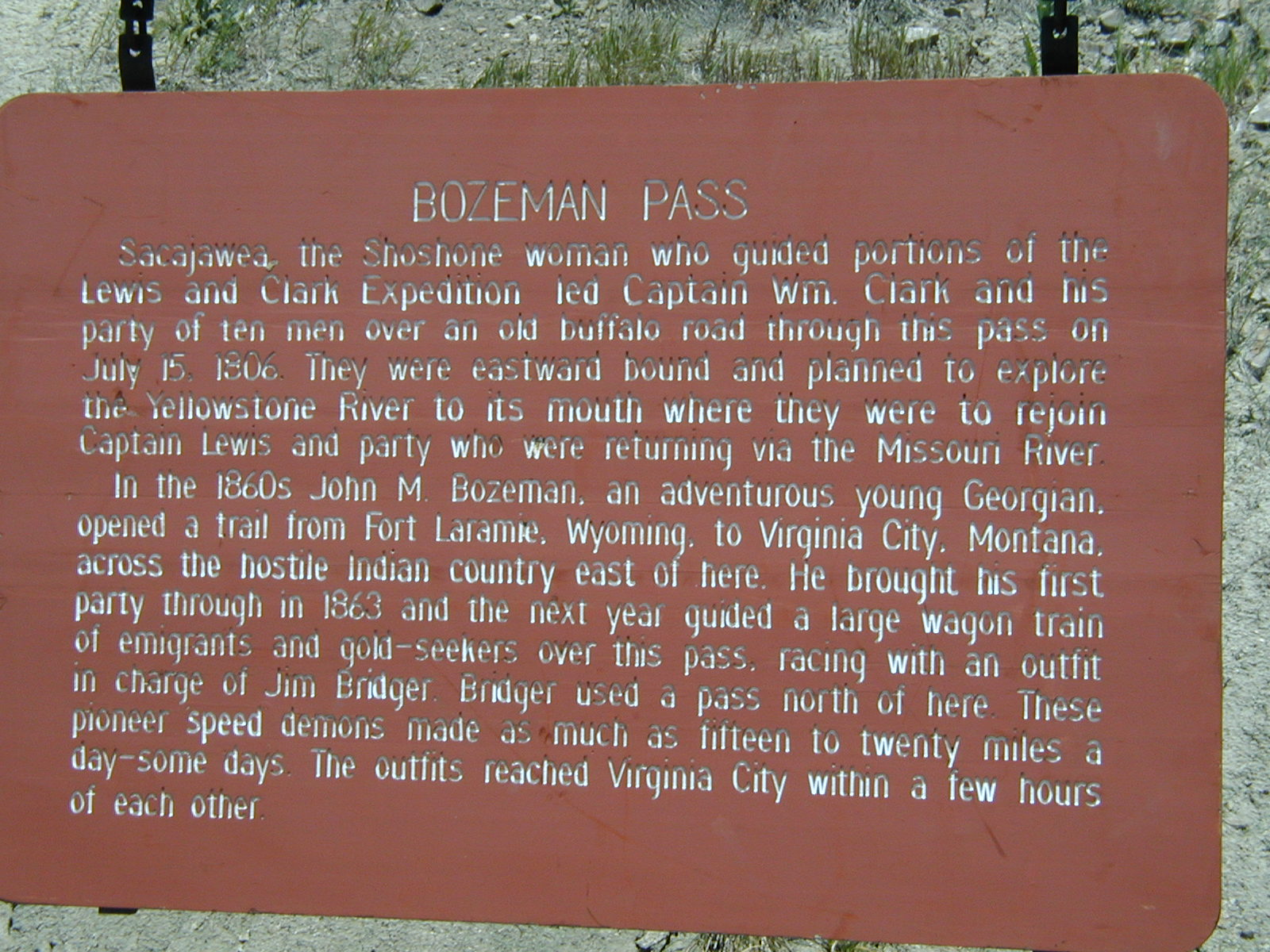
- Historical marker placed at Bozeman Pass on Interstate 90.
- Interactive map of Bozeman Pass
- Elevation: 5,702 ft (1,738 m)
- Traversed by: Interstate 90 and BNSF Railway

Third Approach
- Location: Gallatin County, Montana, United States
- Range: Gallatin Range
- Coordinates: 45°40′02″N 110°48′28″W

Bozeman Pass el. 5,702 feet (1,738 m) is a mountain pass situated approximately 13 miles (21 km) east of Bozeman, Montana and approximately 15 miles (24 km) west of Livingston, Montana on Interstate 90. It separates the Bridger and Gallatin mountain ranges.

It is named after pioneer John Bozeman, a young Georgian who opened the Bozeman Trail from Fort Laramie, Wyoming to Virginia City, Montana in 1863, via the pass which now bears his name. The pass is part of a transcontinental railroad route constructed by the Northern Pacific Railway between Saint Paul, Minnesota and Tacoma, Washington. The Northern Pacific opened a 3,652 feet (1,113 m) tunnel under the Pass in 1884. A shorter 3,015 feet (919 m) tunnel just north of the original opened in 1945. The tracks are now used by BNSF Railway.

Sacagawea, the Shoshone woman who guided parts of the Lewis and Clark Expedition (the Corps of Discovery), led Captain William Clark and his party of ten men through the pass on July 15, 1806. They were eastward bound and planned to explore the Yellowstone River to its mouth, where they were to rejoin Captain Meriwether Lewis and party, who were returning eastward via the Missouri River.

Images of Bozeman Pass
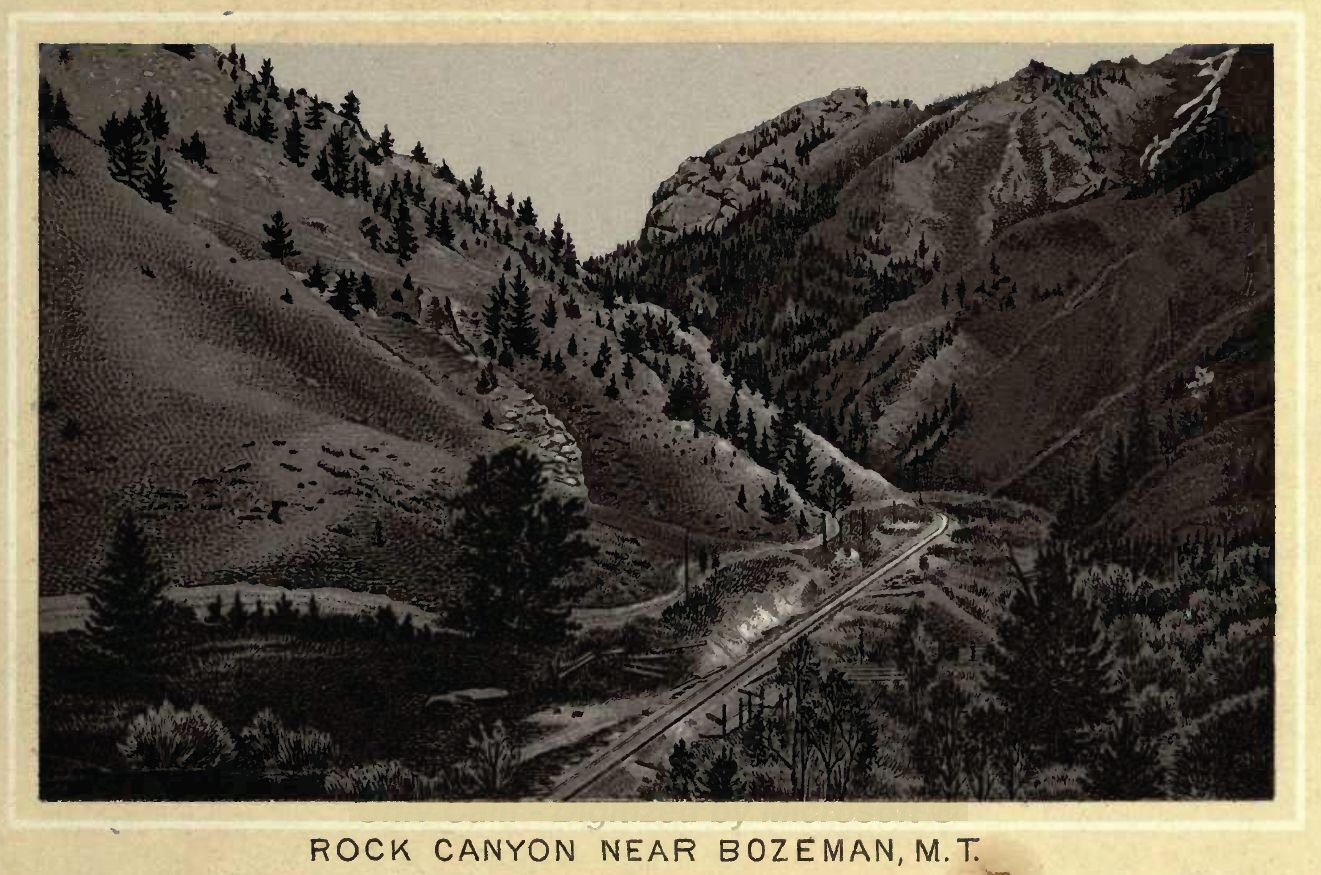
Frank Jay Haynes image of NPR tracks entering Bozeman Pass, 1884

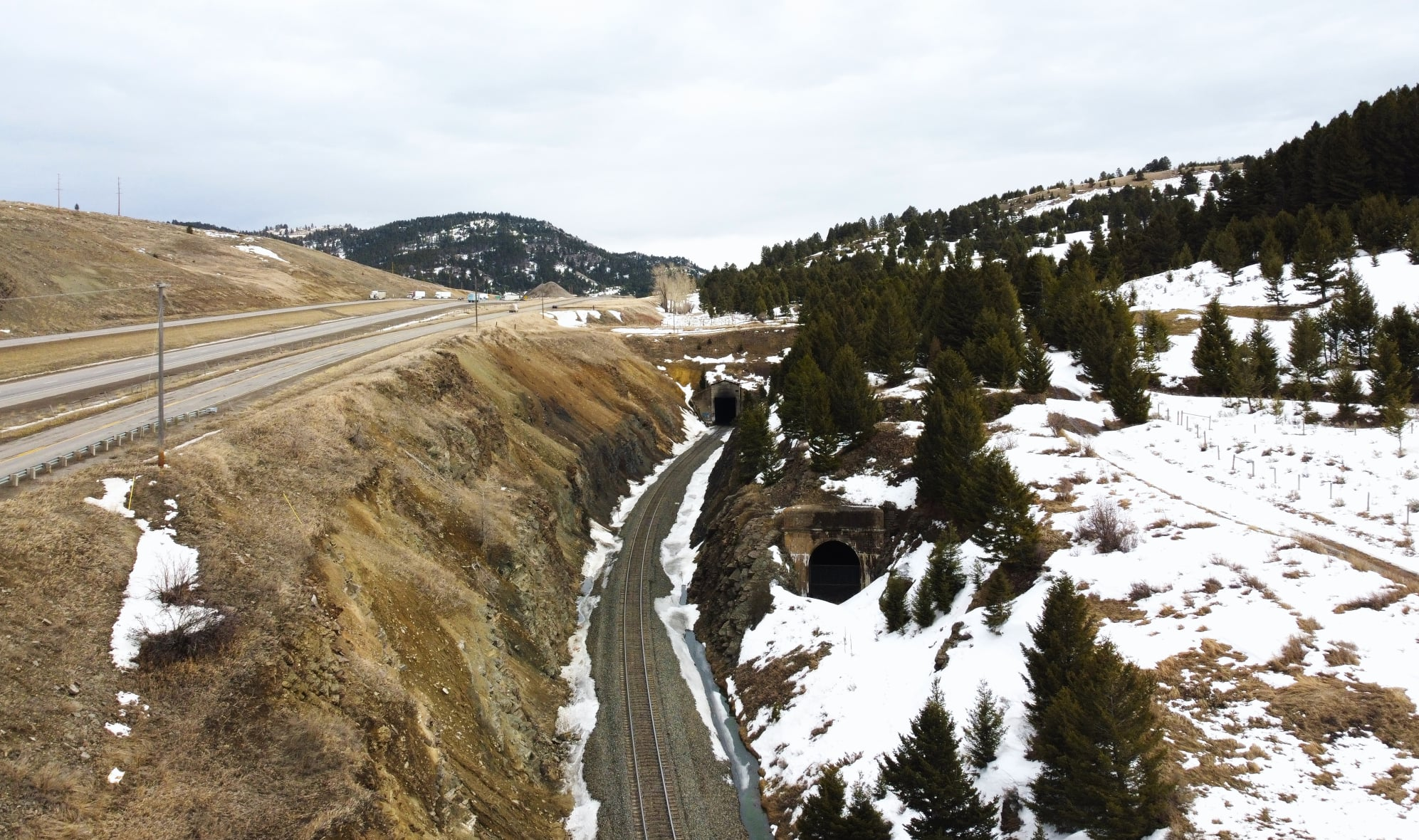
West portals of Bozeman Pass tunnels built by the Northern Pacific Railway. The original 1884 tunnel (abandoned) is on the right, while the newer 1945 tunnel is on the left (now used by BNSF).

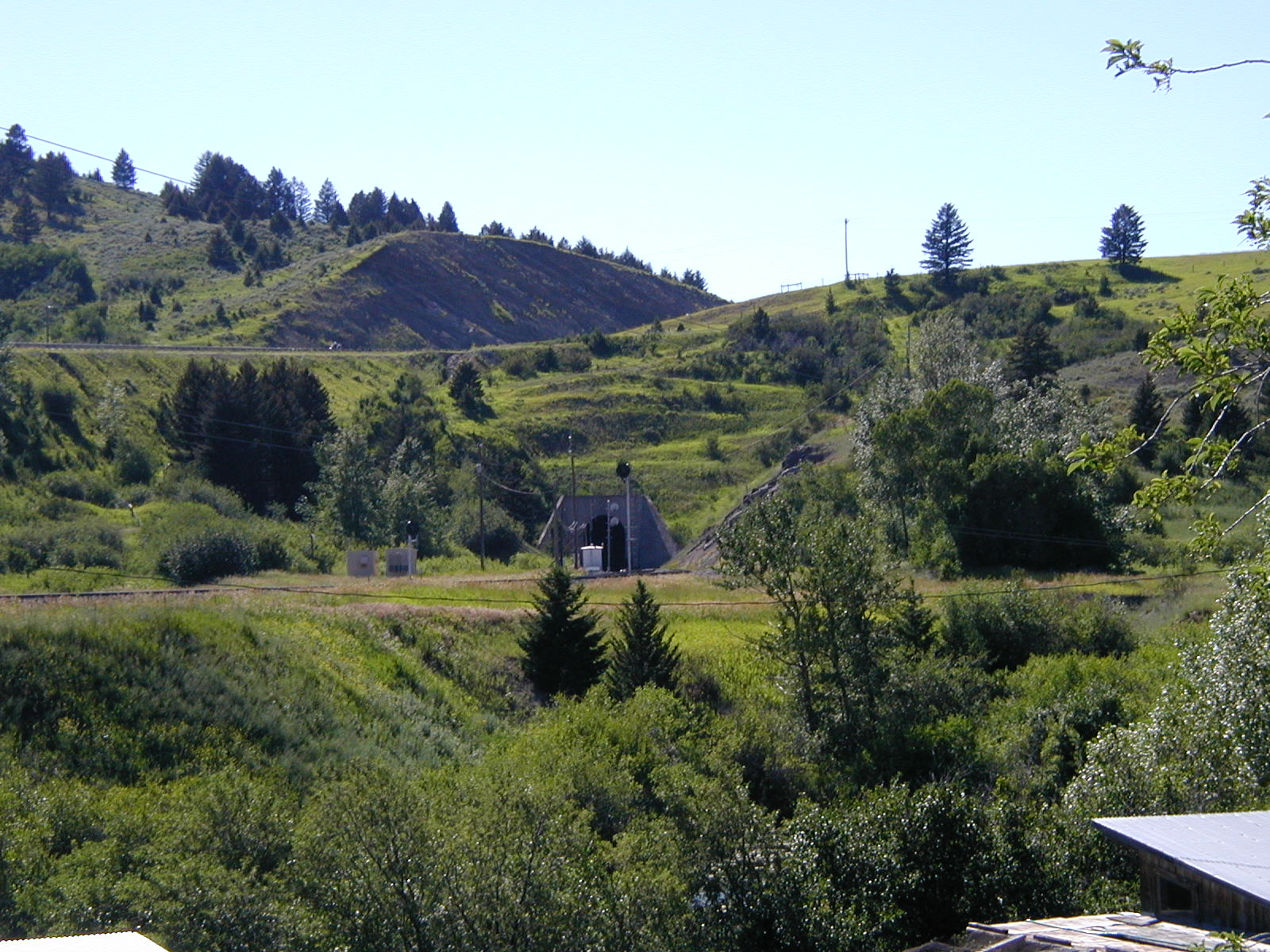
East portal of BNSF's Bozeman Pass tunnel.

== See also ==
- Mountain passes in Montana
