= Bozeman Trail in Wyoming =

- Antelope Creek Crossing (48CO171 and 48CO165)
- U.S. National Register of Historic Places
- Area: 576 acres (233 ha)
- MPS: Bozeman Trail in Wyoming MPS
- NRHP reference No.: 89000816
- Added to NRHP: July 23, 1989

- Holdup Hollow Segment, Bozeman Trail (48CO165)
- U.S. National Register of Historic Places
- Area: 925 acres (374 ha)
- MPS: Bozeman Trail in Wyoming MPS
- NRHP reference No.: 89000818
- Added to NRHP: July 23, 1989

- Ross Flat Segment, Bozeman Trail (48C0165)
- U.S. National Register of Historic Places
- Area: 1,211 acres (490 ha)
- MPS: Bozeman Trail in Wyoming MPS
- NRHP reference No.: 89000811
- Added to NRHP: July 23, 1989

- Sage Creek Station (48CO104)
- U.S. National Register of Historic Places
- Nearest city: Glenrock, Wyoming
- Area: 80 acres (32 ha)
- MPS: Bozeman Trail in Wyoming MPS
- NRHP reference No.: 89000812
- Added to NRHP: July 23, 1989

- Stinking Water Gulch Segment, Bozeman Trail (48CO165)
- U.S. National Register of Historic Places
- Area: 928 acres (376 ha)
- MPS: Bozeman Trail in Wyoming MPS
- NRHP reference No.: 89000817
- Added to NRHP: July 23, 1989

Several sections of the Bozeman Trail in Wyoming are listed on the National Register of Historic Places. Typically there are sections of trail that are concentrated at geographic features such as fords or crossings of divides, where the trail consolidates from a broad swath of parallel, poorly defined paths to a small area where remnants of the trail are visible.

Antelope Creek crossing, also known as the Spring Draw Segment, is a portion of the Bozeman Trail in Converse County, Wyoming that includes a rutted section of the trail as it slopes down to the crossing of Antelope Creek. A stage coach station was located at this place from 1877, featuring a blacksmith shop. The location was listed on the National Register of Historic Places on July 23, 1989. Coordinates:

The Holdup Hollow segment of the Bozeman Trail preserves a section of the trail in Converse County that exhibits a number of wheel rut pathways. The site includes Holdup Hollow, which was reputed to be a favored site for stage coach robberies. The location was listed on the National Register of Historic Places on July 23, 1989. Coordinates:

The Ross Flat segment of the Bozeman Trail is a pathway climbing from the Wind Creek drainage in Converse County to a ridgeline plateau called Ross Flat. About 3.3 miles (5.3 km) are included in the designated section. The location was listed on the National Register of Historic Places on July 23, 1989. Coordinates:

Sage Creek Station was a resting and watering place on the trail. It was protected by ridges and had access to water from Sage Creek at a stop convenient for the first night out from Fort Fetterman. A stage coach station was located here in the 1870s. The site features trash and debris deposits from passers-by during the time the trail was used. The location was listed on the National Register of Historic Places on July 23, 1989.

The Stinking Water Gulch segment of the Bozeman Trail features some of the best-preserved trail ruts in a scenic area where the trail crossed Stinking Water Creek. The location was listed on the National Register of Historic Places on July 23, 1989. Coordinates:
