= Red Cloud's War =

Part of the Sioux Wars

- Part of the Sioux Wars
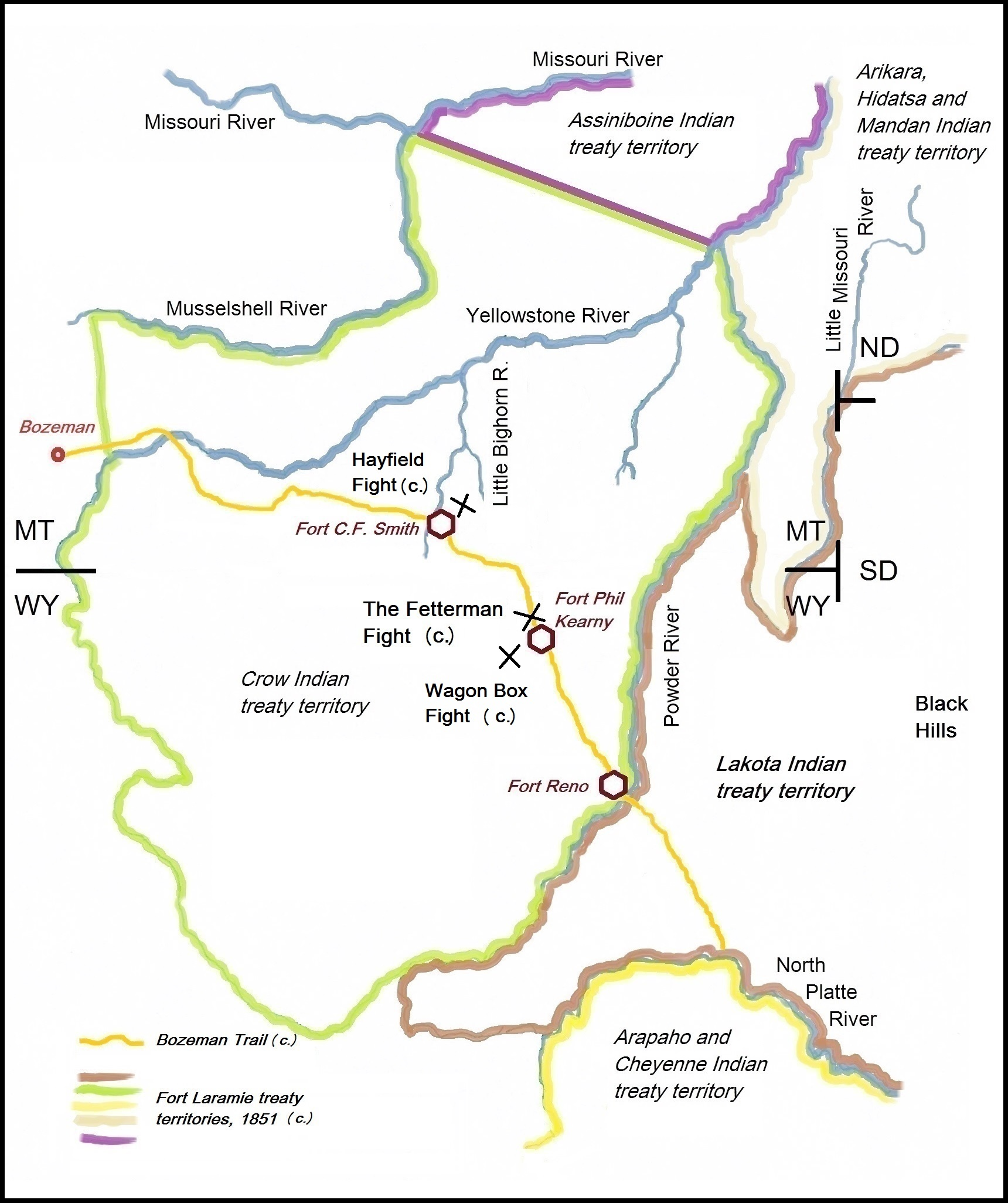
- Battle locations
Date	1866–1868
Location	Powder River Country
Result	Native American victory

Belligerents
Lakota; Northern Cheyenne; Northern Arapaho	United States; Crow Nation

Commanders and leaders
Red Cloud; Crazy Horse; They Fear Even His Horses; High Backbone	Henry B. Carrington; William Fetterman †

Strength
1,500–2,000	700 soldiers; 300 civilians

Casualties and losses
Unknown	~200 killed

Red Cloud's War (also referred to as the Bozeman War or the Powder River War) was an armed conflict between an alliance of the Lakota, Northern Cheyenne, and Northern Arapaho peoples against the United States and the Crow Nation that took place in the Wyoming and Montana territories from 1866 to 1868. The war was fought over control of the western Powder River Country in present-day north-central Wyoming and Montana.

In 1863, European Americans had blazed the Bozeman Trail through the heart of the traditional territory of the Cheyenne, Arapaho, and Lakota. It was the shortest and easiest route from Fort Laramie and the Oregon Trail to the Montana gold fields. From 1864 to 1866, the trail was traversed by about 3,500 miners, emigrant settlers and others, who competed with the Indians for the diminishing resources near the trail.

The United States named the war after Red Cloud, a prominent Oglala Lakota chief allied with the Cheyenne and Arapaho. The United States army had built forts in response to attacks on civilian travelers, using a treaty right according to historian Charles J. Kappler to "establish roads, military and other post". All three forts were located in 1851 Crow Indian territory and accepted by these Indians. The Crow believed they guarded their interests best by cooperating with the US army.

Red Cloud's War consisted mostly of constant small-scale Indian raids and attacks on the soldiers and civilians at the three forts in the Powder River country, wearing down those garrisons. The largest action of the war, the Fetterman Fight (with 81 men killed on the U.S. side), was the worst military defeat suffered by the U.S. on the Great Plains until the Battle of the Little Bighorn in the Crow Indian reservation ten years later. " ... the most dramatic battles between the army and the Dakota [in the 1860s and 1870s] were on lands those Indians had taken from other tribes since 1851."

With peace achieved under the Treaty of Fort Laramie in 1868, the Lakota and their allies were victorious. They gained legal control of the western Powder River country, took down the forts and permanently closed the Bozeman trail. The Crow lost their hunting grounds in the Powder River region to their enemies. With the treaty, "... the [United States] government had in effect betrayed the Crows, who had willingly helped the army to hold the posts for two years". The victory of the Lakota and their allies endured for eight years until the Great Sioux War of 1876, when the US resumed taking their territories, including the sacred Black Hills. In a 1980 Supreme Court case, United States v. Sioux Nation of Indians, the court ruled that tribal lands covered under the treaty had been taken illegally by the US government, and the tribe was owed compensation plus interest. As of 2018 this amounted to more than $1 billion.

== Background ==
As early as 1805, a Crow camp allowed French-Canadian fur trader François Antoine Larocque to follow it across parts of the Powder River area. According to him, the Crow "... inhabit the Eastern part of the Rocky Mountains at the head of the Rivière aux Roches Jaunes (Yellowstone River) and its Branches, Bighorn River, Tongue River, Powder River and others and Close to the head of the Missouri".

From the late 17th century, the Lakota had been moving west into the Plains, enlarging their territory so that by the early 19th century, they controlled the mid-Missouri River region. Cheyenne and Lakota warriors attacked a big Crow camp at Tongue River in 1820, known today as the Tongue River Massacre, making their enmity permanent. In 1843, United States explorer John Frémont said that Lakota had told him that they would soon fight the Crow and take their land, as the Crow country had about the best bison range in the west.

In 1851, the area in question was included in a treaty with the United States for the first time, namely in the Fort Laramie treaty. This peace agreement defined territories for the tribes, in an effort by the US to establish peace among Native tribes and protect its own settlers. The treaty was signed by representatives of some factions of the numerous tribes of the Plains and mountainous West, including Crow, Lakota, Cheyenne and Arapaho; Gros Ventre, Mandan, and Arikara; Assiniboine and other nations. Intertribal warfare had been common among the tribes to gain social and economic advantages in furs, slaves, horses, hunting grounds, and other interests. They continued to wage war against each other into the late 19th century, conducting affairs separate from interaction with US forces and representatives.

As the big game dwindled in the mid-1850s, the Lakota began to enlarge their hunting grounds and encroached and "ignored the boundaries" of the 1851 treaty. They crossed Powder River (the dividing line between the Lakota territory and that of the Crow) and launched their "own program for expansions" westward at the expense of other Natives. For the Crow, the plains near present-day Wyola, Montana became a field for "large-scale battles with invading Sioux". By 1860, the Lakota and their allies had driven the Crows away from their treaty-guaranteed hunting grounds on the west side of the Powder River.

The Lakota winter count by Ben Kindle (Oglala) reflects the fighting between the Crow and the Oglala during these decisive years. In five out of eight "winters" (years) from 1857 to 1864, he refers to Oglala triumphs over the Crow or the reverse. The year 1857 is remembered for a battle in which "The Sioux killed ten Crow Indians." In an 1863 fight, "The Crow killed eight Oglala Sioux."

The discovery of gold in 1863 around Bannack, Montana was a catalyst for white settlers to find an economical route to the gold fields. While some emigrants went to Salt Lake City and then north to Montana, pioneer John Bozeman and John M Jacobs developed the Bozeman Trail from Fort Laramie north through the Powder River country east of the Bighorn Mountains to the Yellowstone, then westward over what is now Bozeman Pass. "It is apparent that the great northern routes of travel to and from Montana, both by land and water, lie through the country of the Crow Indians..." established the Commissioner of Indian Affairs in 1867. However, the Lakotas "had gradually driven the Crows back upon the headwaters of the Yellowstone", and now they claimed "as a conquest almost the entire country traversed by what is called the Powder River route [Bozeman Trail] ...". The trail passed through the Powder River hunting grounds of the Lakota or Western (Teton) Sioux. A second trail, the Bridger Trail, passed west of the Bighorns but was longer and therefore less favored.

The Powder River country encompasses the numerous rivers (the Bighorn, Rosebud, Tongue and Powder) that flow northeastward from the Bighorn Mountains to the Yellowstone. The Cheyenne had been the first tribe in this area, followed by bands of Lakota. As more of the northern plains became occupied by white settlement, this region became the last unspoiled hunting ground of the Northern Cheyenne and Arapaho and several of the seven bands of the Lakota.

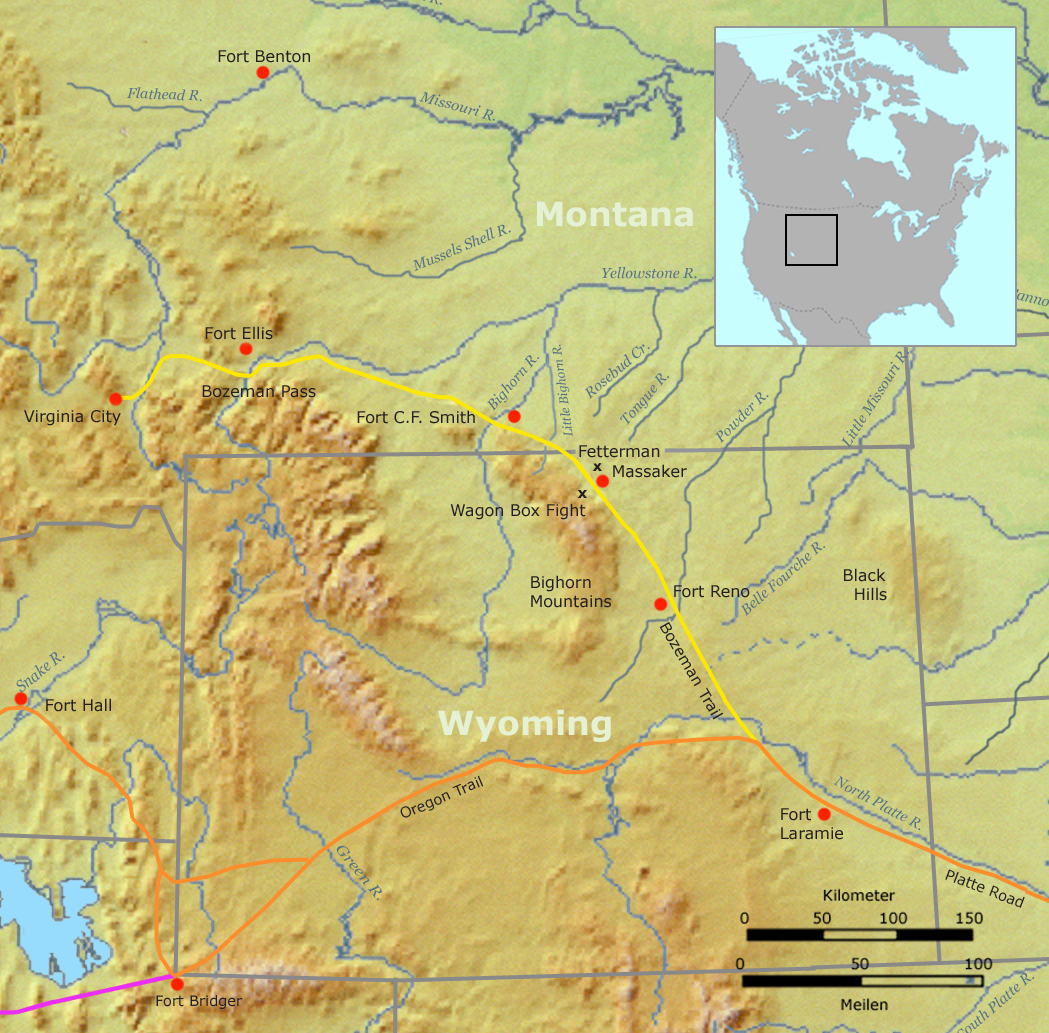
The establishment of three U.S. army forts along the Bozeman trail through Lakota annexed Crow Indian treaty territory caused Red Cloud's war. The Crows fought back against the Indian trespassers by helping the troops in the very same forts that Red Cloud wanted closed.

The treaty breaking annexation of the Crow's Powder River area in the 1850s by the Lakotas was the basis for Red Cloud's War against the United States on exactly the same soil a decade later. The United States vs. the Lakota was a conflict between "... two expanding empires, with the most dramatic battles occurring on lands only recently taken by the Sioux from other tribes".

In 1865, Maj. Gen. Grenville M. Dodge ordered the Powder River Expedition against the Lakota, Cheyenne and Arapaho. Three columns of soldiers numbering 2,675 men, commanded by Patrick E. Connor, moved into the Powder River country. The expedition failed to defeat the Indians in any decisive battles, although it destroyed an Arapaho village at the Battle of the Tongue River. The expedition was a failure in most respects as Lakota Indian resistance to white emigrants traveling the Bozeman Trail became more determined than ever.

After the Powder River Expedition, the U.S. attempted to negotiate safe passage for settlers through Indian territory. In autumn 1865, it negotiated several treaties with Lakota, Cheyenne, and Arapaho leaders. The treaties provided monetary compensation to the Indians in exchange for their agreement to withdraw from the overland routes, established and to be established, in the Powder River country. However, the signatories to these treaties were "Laramie loafers"—Indians who lived near Fort Laramie and lived off handouts. For a treaty to be effective, the Indians who had fought Connor, especially Red Cloud, had to be engaged. No white man could be found to undertake a dangerous mission to find Red Cloud and bring him to Fort Laramie for negotiations, so several of the "loafers" took the task. On March 12, 1866, Red Cloud and his Oglala rode into Fort Laramie. Red Cloud committed to remain peacefully at the Fort until such time as the U.S.'s chief negotiator, E. B. Taylor, arrived with presents for the assembled Indians.

Crows such as Wolf Bow tried to push the whites to take action against the Indian intruders: "Put the Sioux Indians in their own country, and keep them from troubling us. Don't stop fighting them". When possible, the Crow warned the troops of imminent attacks from hostile Indians and they joined soldiers in fending off attempts to capture horses. The strikes and attacks on the soldiers by the Lakota "... appeared to be a great Sioux war to protect their land. And it was but the Sioux had only recently conquered this land from other tribes and now defending the territory both from other tribes and from the advance of white settlers".

== Council at Fort Laramie ==
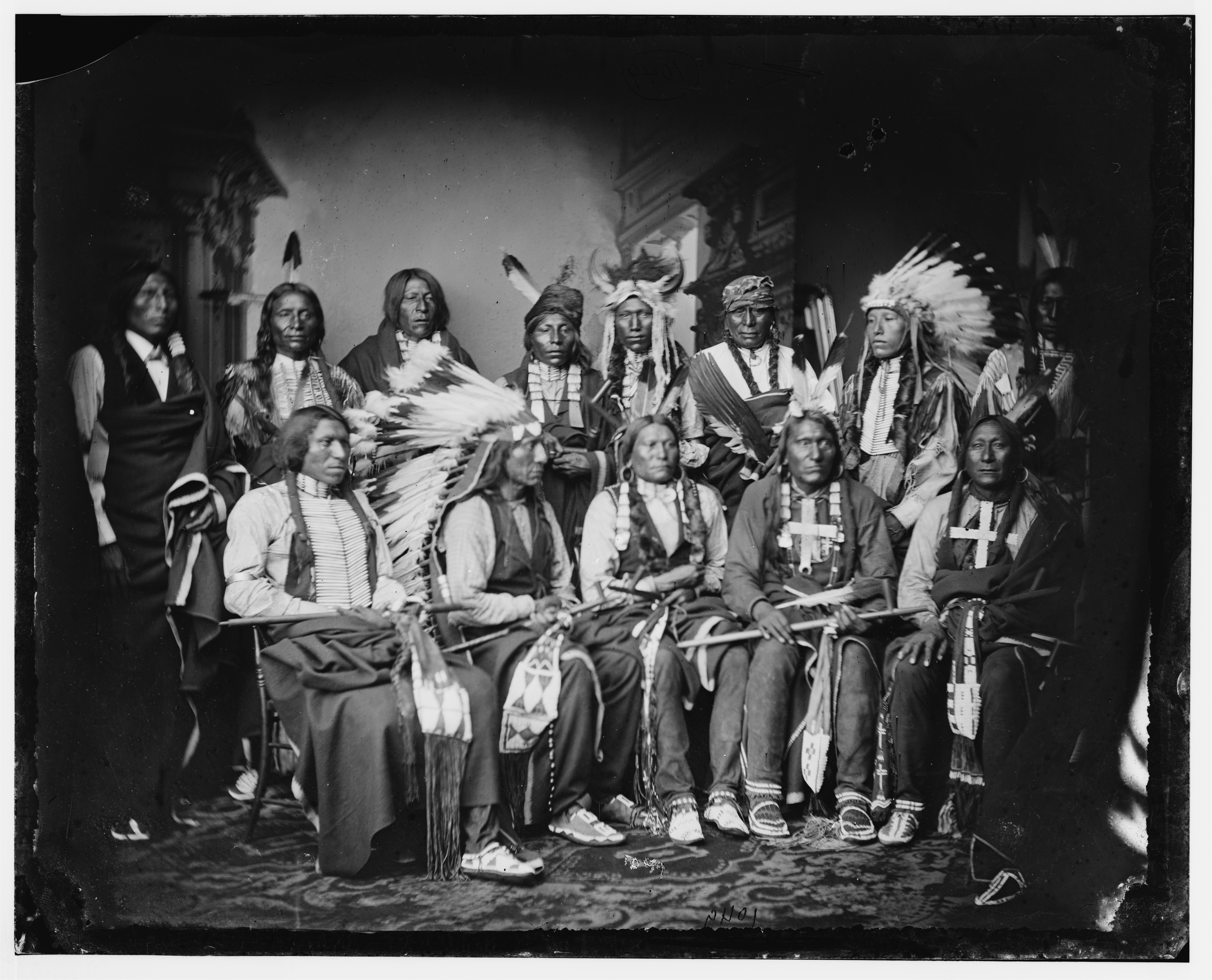
Lakota Sioux chiefs. Red Cloud is seated, second from left. They Fear Even His Horses is standing, second from left. It was hard for the United States to start negotiations with any of these Lakotas, since they did not hold the treaty right to the contested Powder River ground. The Crows did just that.

Negotiations between Red Cloud and other Native American leaders and the United States' representatives began in June 1866. On June 13, however, with the worst possible timing, Colonel Henry B. Carrington commanding the 18th Infantry, arrived at Laramie with the two battalions of the regiment (approximately 1,300 men in 16 companies) and construction supplies. He had orders to establish forts in the Powder River country using the 2nd Battalion of the 18th Infantry. The 3rd Battalion was to garrison posts along the old Oregon Trail, now the Platte Road. Carrington chose the 2nd Battalion because it contained 220 veteran soldiers consolidated after the American Civil War. When Carrington appeared at the negotiations the following day, Red Cloud refused to acknowledge him and accused the U.S. of bad faith in the negotiations. Red Cloud, They Fear Even His Horses, and others withdrew from the negotiations and departed Fort Laramie.

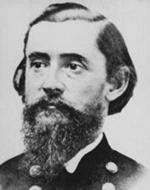
Col. Henry B. Carrington.

Negotiations continued with a reduced number of Indian leaders. The US offered a substantial inducement for their cooperation: 70,000 dollars per year for the Lakota and 15,000 dollars per year for the Cheyenne. The Indians may have learned that the US often failed to deliver on its promises in treaties for annuities. On June 29, Taylor reported to Washington that a treaty had been concluded and that a "most cordial feeling prevails" between white and Indian. He said that only about 300 warriors, led by Red Cloud, objected to the treaty. The US government expressed optimism that the treaty would be successful in keeping the peace. In December, President Andrew Johnson in his State of the Union address said that the Indians had "unconditionally submitted to our authority and manifested an earnest desire for a renewal of friendly relations." Unbeknownst to Johnson, Carrington at that time was under virtual siege by the Indians at Fort Phil Kearny.

The agreement was not ratified. The United States, as signer of the 1851 Fort Laramie treaty, could only undertake meaningful negotiations about the western Powder River plains with the legitimate holder of the area, the Crow tribe.

== Opposing forces ==
Carrington left Fort Laramie for the Powder River Country on June 17, 1866. He led 700 soldiers, 300 civilians, including wives and children of soldiers, and civilian contractors; 226 wagons full of supplies, a 35-man regimental band, and 1,000 head of cattle for a supply of fresh meat. The number of soldiers reflected the reductions that had been made in the army since the Civil War. Previous military expeditions against the Sioux by Alfred Sully, Henry Hastings Sibley, and Patrick Edward Connor from 1863 to 1865 had numbered more than 2,000 soldiers.

Five hundred of Carrington's men were new recruits and most were infantry, rather than cavalry. He had much less ammunition than the 100,000 rounds promised him. Carrington's men were armed with muzzle-loading Springfield rifles from the Civil War rather than new, faster-firing Spencer carbines and breech loading rifles. He had been "equipped with the men, arms, and supplies to build and garrison forts, not to wage war with an active army."

Carrington did not use Indian scouts, but they could have provided him essential intelligence on his opponents and informed him of a mobile search-and-destroy attack force. Nearly all of the meager successes of the Powder River Expedition a year earlier were attributable to the Pawnee and Omaha scouts who had accompanied the expedition. A scout in another Indian war would say of US soldiers, "Uncle Sam's boys are too slow for this kind of work." Carrington's guide was the seasoned Mountain man Jim Bridger.

Carrington's opponents, the migratory hunting and warrior societies of the Lakota Sioux, Northern Cheyenne, and Arapaho, had advantages in mobility, horsemanship, knowledge of the country, guerrilla hit-and-run tactics, and the capability to concentrate their forces to achieve numerical superiority. They also had many weaknesses as a fighting force, especially in organization and weapons. During winter and spring, the scarcity of natural resources resulted in their living in small, scattered autonomous groups. In late summer and fall they congregated into large encampments for ceremonies and to make political decisions and plan collective action. Bands were highly decentralized and individual Indians felt little obligation to obey group decisions. The Lakota consisted of seven independent bands, each made up of numerous sub-bands, all of whom operated independently. The Cheyenne had a more structured and centralized political organization.

Some historians have estimated that Red Cloud's warriors numbered up to 4,000 men. The total number of Lakota in 1865 was about 13,860. The Northern Cheyenne and Arapaho numbered about 3,000, adding up to a total of about 17,000 Indian men, women, and children. Thousands of people in all three of those tribes were not in the Powder River country with Red Cloud; others stayed aloof from warfare. As had been typical of United States militias, Indian men were part-time warriors. They had to spend much of summer and fall each year hunting buffalo and other game to feed their families. In the late winter and spring, they were limited in mobility until the grass turned green and their horses could recover their strength after the severe winters of the northern Great Plains. The effectiveness of Indian forces were diminished by their lack of cohesion and organization.

The Indians had few guns and little ammunition; only six of the 81 soldiers who were later killed in the Fetterman Fight had gunshot wounds, and two of those may have shot themselves accidentally. Their basic weapon was the bow and arrow. The short (usually less than four feet long) and stout Indian bow was designed for short-distance hunting from horseback. Although deadly at short range, it probably had less than one-half the range of the English longbow, which was effective to 200 yards (180 m). Indian warriors lacked the capability to do significant damage to their opponents at ranges of more than 100 yards (90 m). By contrast, the soldier's Springfield Model 1861 muskets had an effective range of 300 yards or more. The Springfield musket, however, had a much lower rate of fire than the bow, offsetting to an extent its range advantage.

== War ==
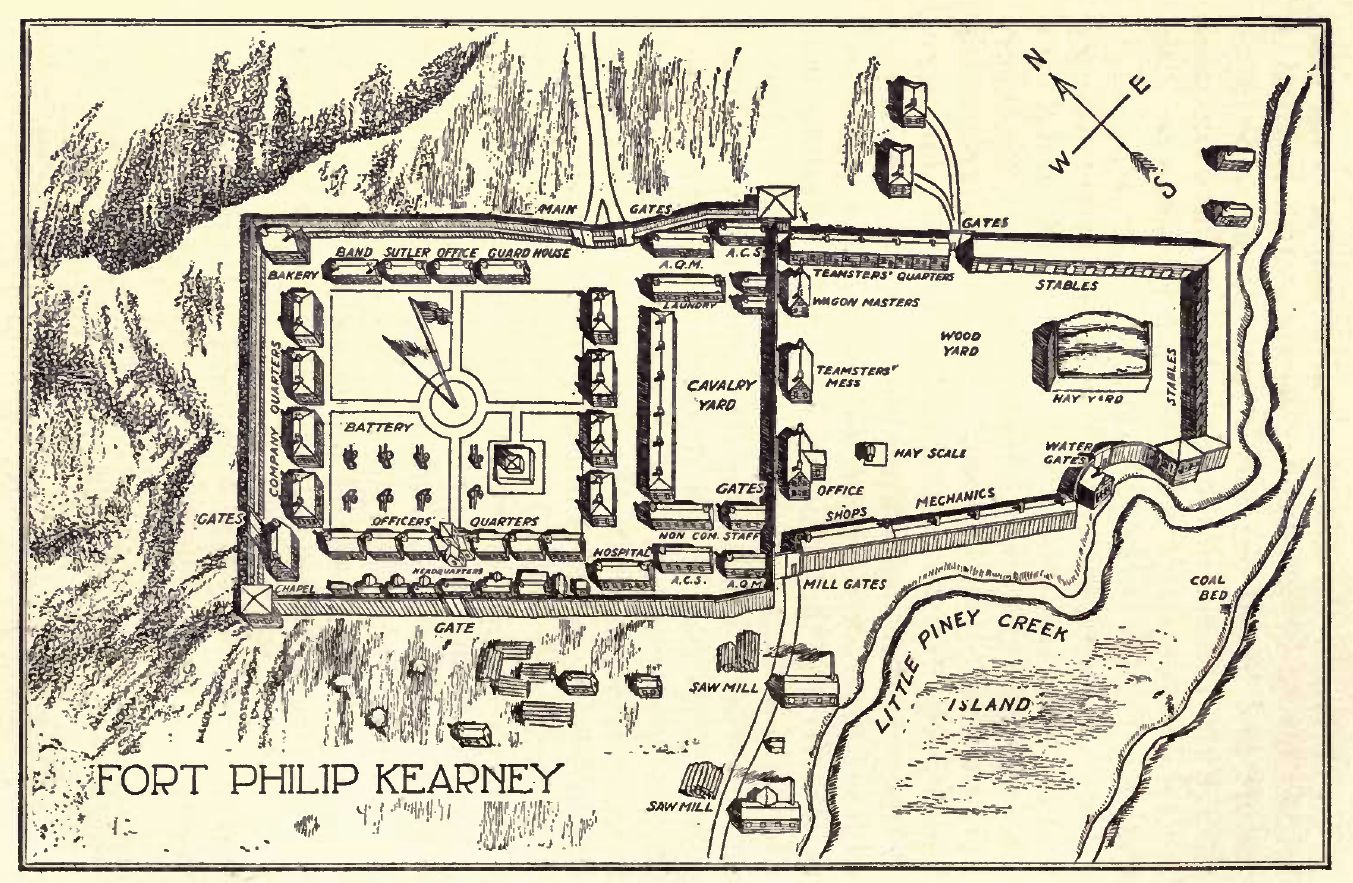
Fort Phil Kearny was constructed to house 1,000 soldiers, a number never achieved in its brief history. Similar to Fort Reno and Fort C. F. Smith it was built in Crow treaty land and accepted by these Indians.

Carrington and his caravan reached Fort Reno on June 28, and left two companies (about 100 men) there to relieve the two companies of the 5th U.S. Volunteers (nicknamed the "Galvanized Yankees"), who had garrisoned the fort over the winter. Proceeding north, on July 14, Carrington founded Fort Phil Kearny on Piney Creek, near present-day Buffalo, Wyoming.

From there two companies of the 18th advanced 91 miles to the northwest, where on August 13, they established a third post, Fort C. F. Smith on the Bighorn River. Given the typically early and severe winters of the high plains, the middle of August was very late in the year to begin constructing forts, but Carrington's march had been slowed by having to transport a large mechanical "grass-cutting machine." With replacements and reinforcements, Carrington's total force did not much exceed 700, of whom 400 were located at Fort Kearny.

Carrington was an engineer and political appointee, inexperienced in combat. He spent manpower resources building superior fortifications. Arriving in the region in mid-July, he tried to prepare for winter. Given the severity of the Wyoming winters, this was reasonable, but many of his junior officers, anxious for battle, were infuriated. Most were Civil War veterans, but they were unfamiliar with Indian fighting and believed the warriors could be easily defeated.

On July 16, a group of Cheyenne, including Dull Knife and Two Moons, visited Carrington at Fort Reno and proclaimed their desire for peace. They said that Red Cloud was nearby with 500 warriors. Two white civilians were killed that day, and the Lakota campaign against the forts along the Trail began the next day. Red Cloud's warriors infiltrated the picket lines near the fort and stampeded 175 horses and mules. About 200 soldiers pursued the Indians in a running 15 mile fight, attempting unsuccessfully to recover the animals and suffering two men killed and three wounded. Returning to the fort, they found the bodies of six civilian traders killed by the Indians.

On July 20, Red Cloud's warriors attacked a wagon train of 37 soldiers and civilians, killing two, at Crazy Woman Fork of the Powder River. After they attacked other civilian wagon trains, nearly all civilian traffic on the Bozeman Trail ceased. Carrington could only be re-supplied with food and ammunition by heavily guarded wagon trains. In the weeks and months that followed, the Indians repeatedly attacked the wagon trains that sallied out of Fort Kearny to cut construction timber in a forest six miles away. For defense, the wood trains were large, consisting of two parallel lines of 24 to 40 wagons guarded by mounted soldiers on either flank. In the event of an attack, the wagons were quickly drawn into a corral for defense. Fifteen Indian attacks near Fort Kearny between July 16 and September 27 resulted in the deaths of 6 soldiers and 28 civilians and the loss of several hundred horses, mules, and cattle. Carrington's hay-cutting machine was also destroyed.

=== Battle of the Hundred Slain/Fetterman Fight ===
In November 1866, Captains William J. Fetterman and James Powell arrived at Fort Phil Kearny from the 18th Infantry's headquarters garrison at Fort Laramie to replace several officers recently relieved of duty. Unlike Carrington, Fetterman had extensive combat experience during the Civil War, but he lacked experience fighting Native Americans. Fetterman disagreed with Carrington's strategy, reportedly saying it was "passive" and boasting that given "80 men," he "would ride through the Sioux nation." Later, Carrington reported these boasts while trying to defend his own reputation.

On December 6, a force of Company C, 2nd Cavalry tasked to protect a wood train, was attacked by Red Cloud. Commanding officer Second Lieutenant Horace S. Bingham was among those killed as he had followed them as they retreated over Lodge Trail Ridge and been overwhelmed. Carrington worried about his officers' tendency to follow blindly such Indian decoy parties. Fetterman was outraged by what he considered the ineffectiveness of Carrington's leadership. He understood the commander of the Department of the Platte, Gen. Philip St. George Cooke, to have ordered the garrison to mount an aggressive winter campaign.

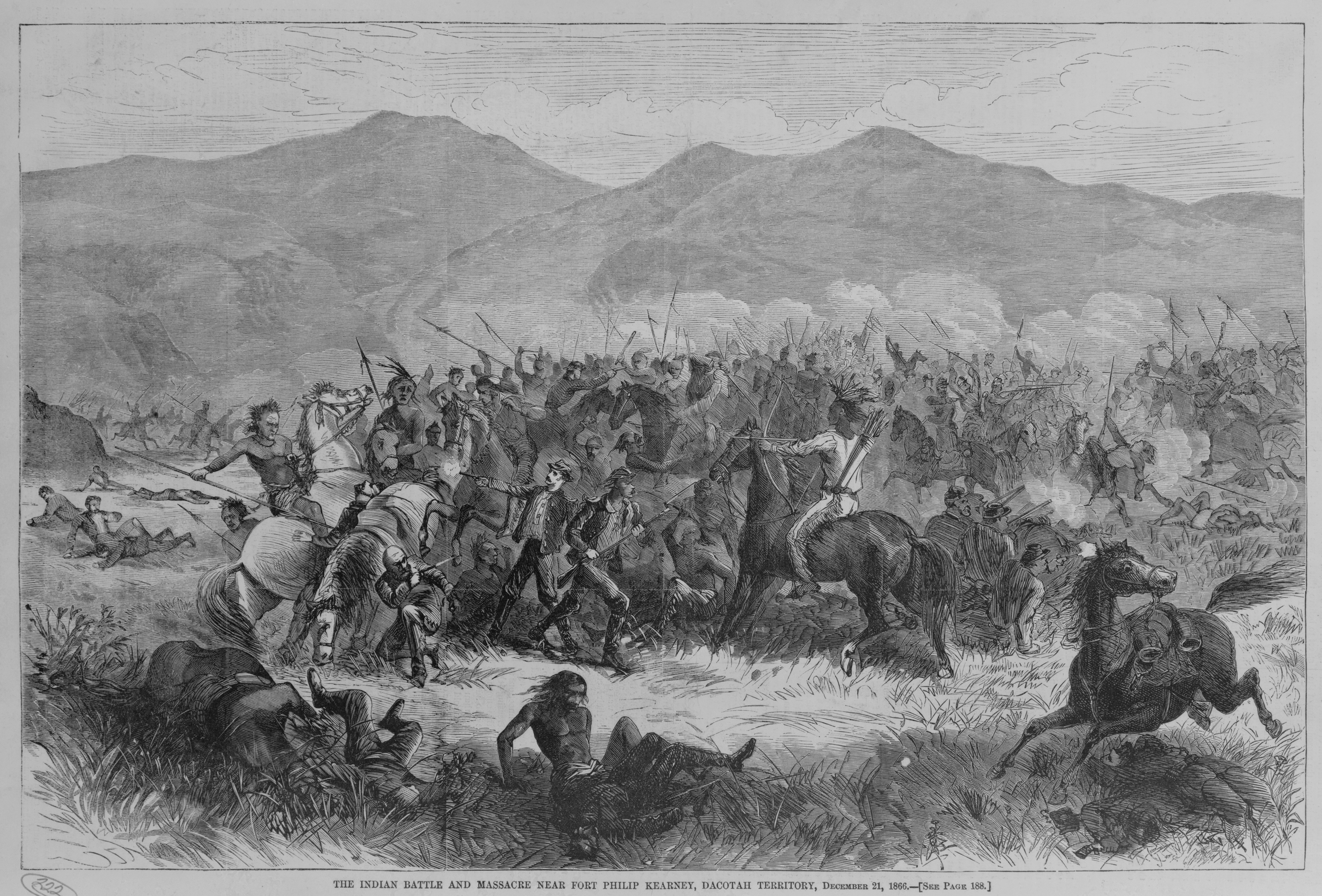
The battle near Fort Philip Kearney, Dakota Territory, December 21, 1866. The battle stood outside the 1851 treaty territory of the Lakotas. These Indian newcomers won the western Powder River hunting grounds for themselves by displacing the local Crows at first. Secondly, they defeated the white soldiers on the very same plains in fights as the one pictured here.

On the morning of December 21, 1866, the wood train was attacked again. Carrington ordered a relief party composed of 49 infantrymen of the 18th Infantry, 27 mounted troopers of the 2nd Cavalry, with Captain James Powell to command. Powell had led a similar effort two days earlier and declined to pursue the Indians over the ridge. However, by claiming seniority as a brevet lieutenant colonel, Fetterman asked for and was given command of the relief party. Powell remained behind. Another officer of the 18th, Lt. George W. Grummond, also a vocal critic of Carrington, led the cavalry, which had been leaderless since Lt. Bingham's death in early December. Captain Frederick Brown, until recently the post quartermaster and another of Carrington's critics, and two civilians, James Wheatley and Isaac Fisher, joined Fetterman, bringing the relief force up to 81 officers and men. The infantry marched out first; the cavalry had to retrieve its mounts before it could follow and catch up.

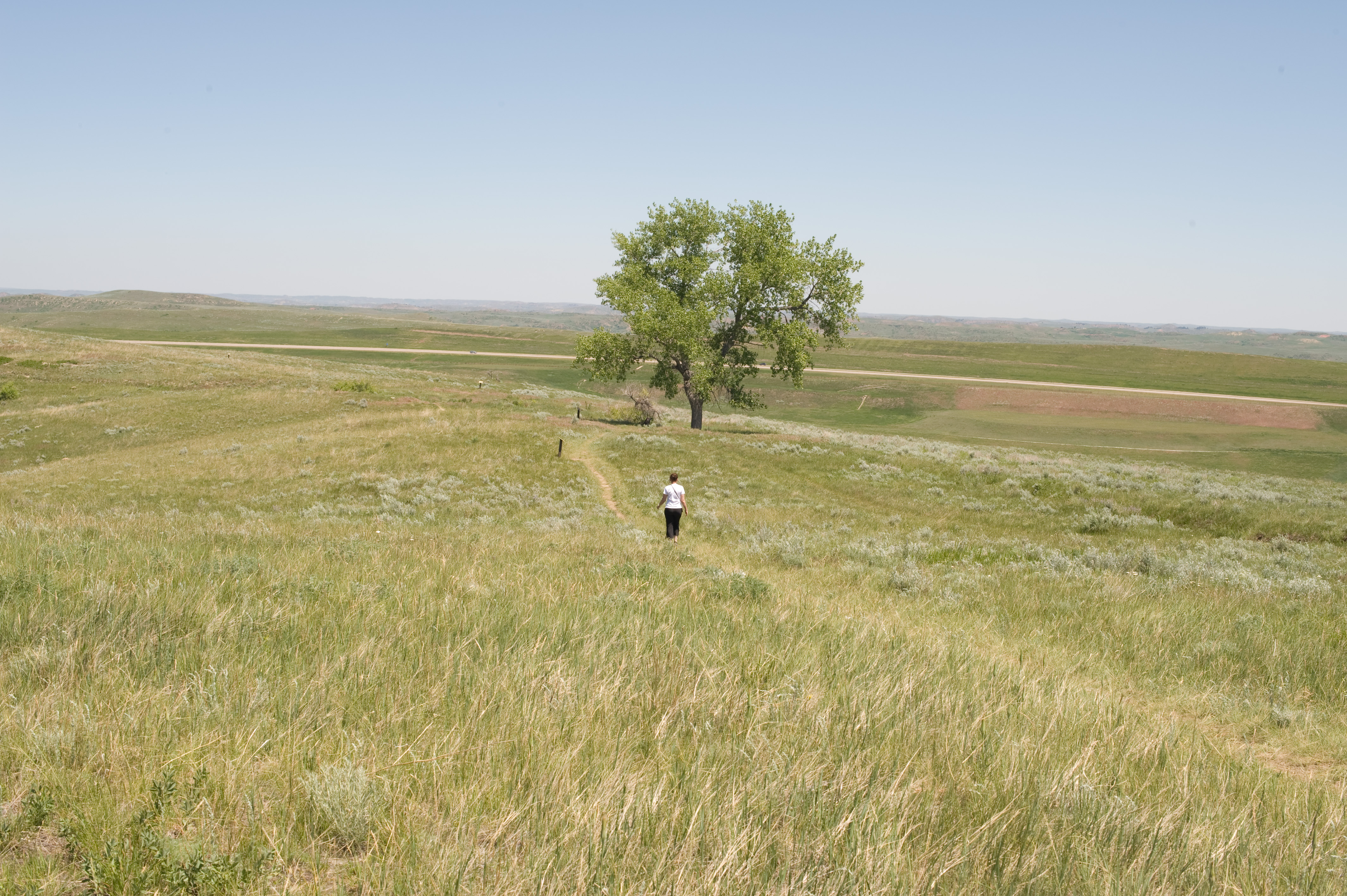
Massacre Hill, looking northeast from Fetterman Monument. The Arapaho and Cheyenne were concealed to the left (west) of the foot trail in this photo; the Lakota to the right (east).

Colonel Carrington said he ordered Fetterman not to cross Lodge Trail Ridge, where relief from the fort would be difficult, and that he told Grummond to remind Fetterman of his order. Upon leaving the fort, Fetterman, instead of marching down the wood road to the relief of the wood train, turned north and crossed the Sullivant Hills toward Lodge Trail Ridge. Within a few minutes of their departure, a Lakota decoy party including Oglala warrior Crazy Horse appeared on Lodge Trail Ridge. Fetterman took the bait; several of the warriors stood on their ponies and insultingly waggled their bare buttocks at the troopers. Fetterman and his company were joined by Grummond at the crossing of the creek; they deployed in skirmish line and marched over the Ridge in pursuit. They raced into the Peno Valley, where an estimated 1,000–3,000 Indians were concealed. They had fought the soldiers there on December 6.

The ambush was not observed from the fort, but around noon, men at the fort heard gunfire, beginning with a few shots followed immediately by sustained firing. When the Oglala and Cheyenne sprang their trap, the soldiers had no escape; none survived. Evidence indicated the cavalry probably had charged the Indians; the bodies of the cavalry's most advanced group were found nearly a mile down the ridge beyond the infantry.

Reports from the burial party sent to collect the remains said the soldiers had died in three groups. The most advanced, and probably most effective, were the two civilians, armed with 16-shot Henry repeating rifles, and a small number of cavalrymen who had dismounted and taken cover in the rocks. Up the slope behind them were the bodies of most of the retreating cavalrymen, armed with new 7-shot Spencer carbines, but encumbered by their horses and lacking cover. Further up the slope were Fetterman, Brown, and the infantrymen. They had nearly obsolete Civil War muzzle-loading muskets; the Indians were armed with equally obsolete weaponry. These foot soldiers fought from cover for a short while, until their ammunition ran out and they were overrun.

Carrington heard the gunfire and immediately sent out a 40-man support force on foot under Captain Tenedor Ten Eyck. Shortly after, the 30 remaining cavalrymen of Company C were sent dismounted to reinforce Ten Eyck, followed by two wagons, the first loaded with hastily loaded ammunition and escorted by another 40 men. Carrington called for an immediate muster of troops to defend the post. Including the wood train detail, the detachments had left only 119 troops remaining inside the fort.

Ten Eyck took a roundabout route and reached the ridgetop just as the firing ceased about 12:45 p.m. He sent back a message reporting that he could not see Fetterman's force, but the valley was filled with groups of Indians taunting him to come down. Ten Eyck suffered severe criticism for not marching straight to battle, though doing so would have resulted only in the destruction of his force, too. Ten Eyck reached and recovered the bodies of Fetterman's men. Because of continuing Indian threat, they could not recover those of the cavalry for two days.

By that time, Fetterman and his entire 81-man detachment were dead. Carrington's official report said that Fetterman and Brown shot each other to avoid capture. Army autopsies recorded Fetterman's death wound as a knife slash. It remains a subject of debate. The warriors mutilated most of the bodies of the soldiers. Most of the dead soldiers were scalped, beheaded, dismembered, disemboweled, and often castrated, facts widely publicized by the newspapers. The only body left untouched was that of a young teenage bugler, Adolph Metzler. He was believed to have fought several Indians with just his bugle as a bludgeon. Aside from his fatal head and chest injuries, his body was left untouched and covered with a buffalo robe by the Indians. The reason for this remains unknown.

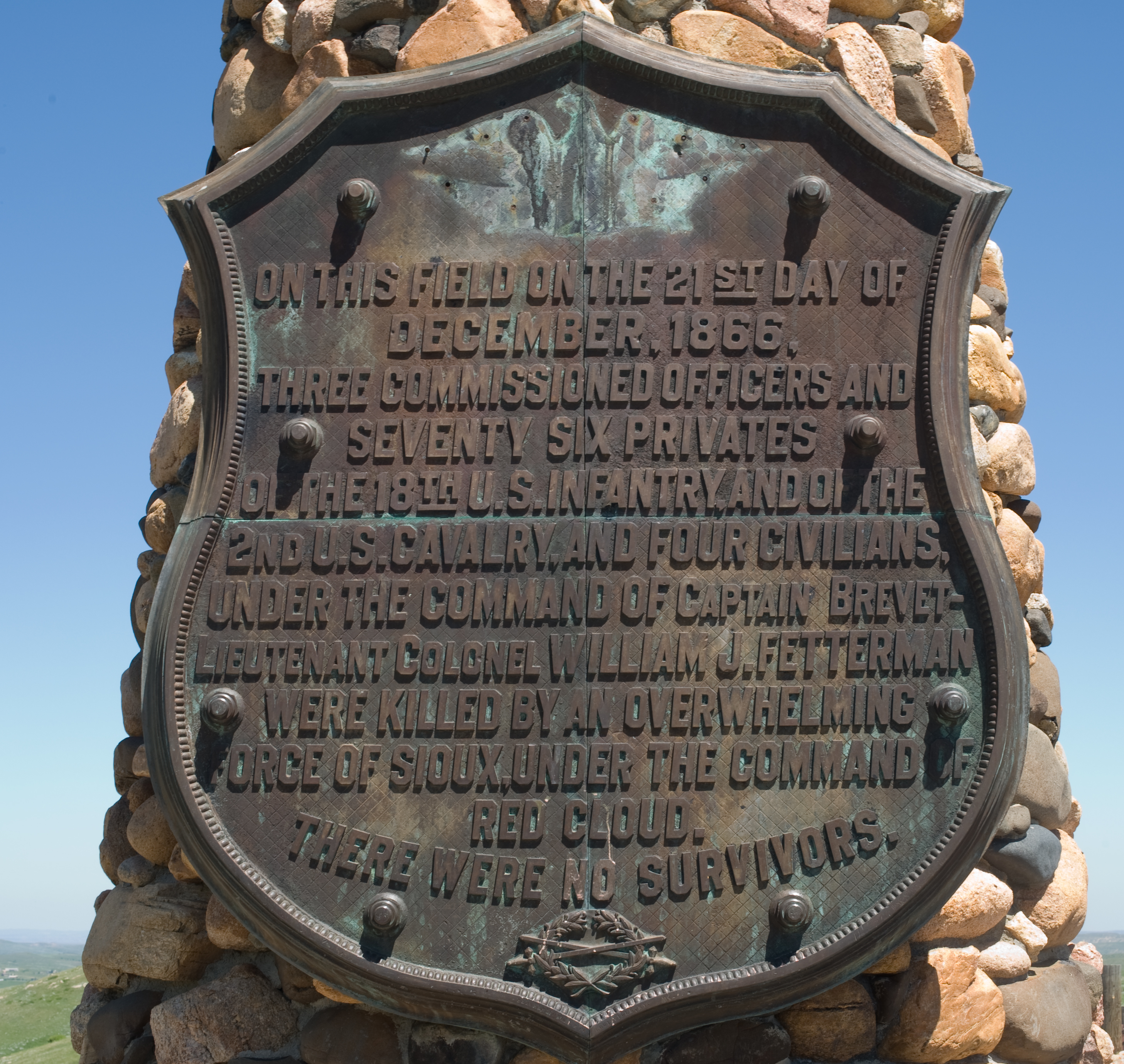
Fetterman Monument on Massacre Hill

This battle was called the "Battle of the Hundred Slain" or the "Battle of the Hundred in the Hand" by the Indians and the "Fetterman Massacre" by the soldiers. It was the Army's worst defeat on the Great Plains until the Little Big Horn battle nearly ten years later.

=== After the Fetterman Fight ===
The evening after the Fetterman disaster, a civilian, John "Portugee" Philips, volunteered to carry a distress message to Fort Laramie. Carrington's message to General Cooke reported Fetterman's defeat and requested immediate reinforcements and supplies of repeating Spencer carbines. Philips accomplished the 236 miles (380 km) ride to Fort Laramie in four days. A blizzard began on December 22, and Philips rode through a foot (30 cm) of snow and temperatures below 0 °F (−18 °C). He did not see any Indians during his ride. He arrived at Fort Laramie late in the evening on December 25, during a full-dress Christmas ball. He staggered, exhausted, into the party to deliver his message.

General Cooke immediately relieved Carrington of command, replacing him with Brigadier General Henry W. Wessells. Wessells arrived safely at Fort Kearny on January 16 with two companies of cavalry and four of infantry. One man in his command froze to death during the journey. Carrington left Fort Kearny on January 23 with his wife and the other women and children, including the pregnant wife of the deceased Lt. Grummond, and braved temperatures as low as −38 °F (−39 °C) during the journey to Fort Laramie. One half of his 60-soldier escort suffered frostbite. General Ulysses S. Grant, commanding the U.S. Army, was not inclined to blame only Carrington. He relieved Cooke on January 9, 1867. Both an Army court of inquiry and the Secretary of the Interior investigated the Fetterman Fight. The Army reached no official conclusion, and Interior exonerated Carrington. After a severe hip injury, Carrington resigned his commission in 1870. He spent the rest of his life defending his actions and condemning Fetterman's alleged disobedience.

After the Fetterman Fight, the Indians dispersed into smaller groups for the 1866–1867 winter. Conflict subsided for the season. Wessells and his men at Fort Phil Kearny had a difficult time through the winter. Food was short, most of the horses and mules died from lack of forage, and scurvy was common among the soldiers. He cancelled plans for a punitive winter campaign against the Indians. In April, Indians began raids along the Oregon Trail in the North Platte River valley. Journalist Henry M. Stanley, (later achieving fame in Africa), said, "Murders are getting to be so tame from their plurality, that no one pays any attention to them."

Most serious was the Indian threat to the construction of the first transcontinental railroad routed through southern Wyoming. Although army forces had been augmented along the Bozeman Trail and at Fort Laramie in the wake of the Fetterman disaster, resources were still insufficient to take the offensive against the Indians. Peace negotiations conducted by the friendly Lakota chieftain Spotted Tail with Red Cloud initially seemed promising, but proved to be only a delaying tactic by the Indians. The Lakota held their annual Sun Dance in July, delaying the renewal of major hostilities.

=== Hayfield and Wagon Box fights ===
In late July 1867, the Lakota and Cheyenne took two different paths in attacks. A force composed primarily of Cheyenne and Arapaho gathered for an attack at Fort C. F. Smith on the Bighorn River in Montana. Another, mostly Lakota, decided to attack Fort Phil Kearny, 90 miles (140 km) southeast. Crow people lived near Fort Smith and provided intelligence to the soldiers at the fort, warning of upcoming attacks. On July 23, the fort was reinforced by two companies of infantry under Lt. Col. Luther P. Bradley, bringing the complement of the fort up to 350 soldiers.

Most importantly, the reinforcements were armed with breech-loading Springfield Model 1866 rifles, replacing the muskets the soldiers had previously been issued. The new rifles had a rate of fire of 8 to 10 shots per minute compared to 3 to 4 for the muzzle-loading muskets; also, they could be easily reloaded by men lying in a prone position.

The supply of the new Springfields was perhaps the biggest change in the conflict since the Fetterman Fight. They allowed the soldiers to reload quickly, ending the Indian tactic of charging defenses before the soldiers could reload. With the new rifles, the soldiers could also remain behind cover while reloading.

The soldiers at Fort Smith were tasked with protecting civilians cutting hay for winter food for the fort's horses. On the morning of August 1, 21 soldiers and 9 civilians were working in the hayfield 3 miles (5 km) from Fort Smith, when several hundred mounted Indians charged them; the soldiers and civilians took cover behind logs in a makeshift fort and in rifle pits. During the course of the day, the Americans repulsed several attacks with their fast-firing rifles. The Indians broke off the attack in the afternoon. American casualties were two soldiers and one civilian killed and three wounded. The Indians claimed they had lost eight dead; the soldiers estimated they had killed 18 to 23.

The Wagon Box Fight near Fort Kearny the next day was similar. Twenty-six soldiers and 6 civilians were escorting a wood-cutting detail outside the fort. The heavy wooden boxes of 14 wagons had been placed on the ground in an oval corral near the main cutting site, and most of the soldiers and civilians took refuge there when hundreds of mounted Indian warriors suddenly appeared. Armed with the new breech-loading rifles, the Americans held off the Indians for six hours before being rescued by a relief force from Fort Kearny. Three Americans were killed and two wounded in the corral, and four woodcutters were killed about 1 mi (1,600 m) away. The Wagon Box Fight was hailed at the time as the "greatest Indian battle in the world," with Indian casualties fancifully estimated at up to 1,500. Historian George E. Hyde has said the Indians had 6 killed and 6 wounded and did not regard the fight as a defeat, as they captured a large number of mules and horses. Many years later Red Cloud claimed not to remember the Wagon Box Fight, although given the large number of Indians engaged that seems unlikely.

The outcomes of the Hayfield and Wagon Box fights discouraged the Indians from mounting additional large-scale attacks, but they continued harassment of the forts along the Bozeman Trail, killing soldiers and civilians. On August 7 the Indians attacked a Union Pacific Railroad train at Plum Creek near present-day Lexington, Nebraska, far from the Powder River Country and in a region considered by the US to be peaceful until then. This alarmed the government.

== Treaty of Fort Laramie ==
Despite the military successes in the Hayfield and Wagon Box Fights, the U.S. government increasingly sought a peaceful rather than a military solution to Red Cloud's War. The successful completion of the transcontinental railroad took priority, and the Army did not have the resources to defend both the railroad and the Bozeman Trail from Indian attacks. The military presence in the Powder River Country was both expensive and unproductive, with estimates that 20,000 soldiers might be needed to subdue the Indians.

Peace commissioners were sent to Fort Laramie in the spring of 1868. Red Cloud refused to meet with them until the Army abandoned the Powder River forts, Phil Kearny, C. F. Smith, and Reno. In August 1868, Federal soldiers abandoned the forts and withdrew to Fort Laramie. The day after the soldiers left the forts, the Indians burned them. The Bozeman Trail was closed for all time.

Red Cloud did not arrive at Fort Laramie until November. He signed the Treaty of Fort Laramie of 1868, which created the Great Sioux Reservation, including the Black Hills. The reservation included all of South Dakota west of the Missouri River. Northern Arapaho representatives also signed the treaty. The treaty declared the Powder River country as "unceded Indian territory", as a reserve for the Indians who chose not to live on the new reservation, and as a hunting reserve for the Lakota, Cheyenne, and Arapaho. The treaty also accorded the Lakota Indians continued hunting rights in western Kansas and eastern Colorado, along with other peoples such as the Pawnees. These far, southern hunting grounds along the forks of Republican River remained holdings of the United States, as they had been since 1833, when the Pawnee Indians sold this area and other parts of their country to the whites. Most importantly, the treaty specified what Red Cloud sought: "no white person or persons shall be permitted to settle upon or occupy any portion" of the Powder River country "or without the consent of the Indians first had and obtained, to pass through" the Powder River country.

The Lakotas on their part allowed the construction of "any railroad" outside the reservation. They would give up "all right to occupy permanently the territory outside" it and "regard said reservation their permanent home". They accepted "not to attack any persons at home, or travelling ...".

Although a treaty between the United States and the Lakotas, it had profound consequences for the Crows. In order to realize the Lakota demand to the western Powder River area, the United States first had to buy it from the 1851 treaty right holder, the Crow, and then recognize the Lakota tribe as the next proprietor. Consequently, parallel with the negotiations with the Lakota, the United States had treaty talks with the Crow Indians. On May 7, 1868, the Crows accepted to sell large parts of their 1851 treaty territory to the United States. The ceded area included the western Powder River hunting grounds of the Crow, already for years taken in possession by the Lakotas and their allies without consent. The Crows also agreed to settle on a smaller reservation right on the south side of the Yellowstone, in the center of their 1851 territory. The Crow reservation included "The Valley of Chieftains", to the whites known as the valley of Little Bighorn River.

The small Ponca tribe was another Indian nation affected by the new Fort Laramie treaty. By mistake, the United States had given the Lakotas treaty right to the reservation of the Poncas.

== Aftermath ==
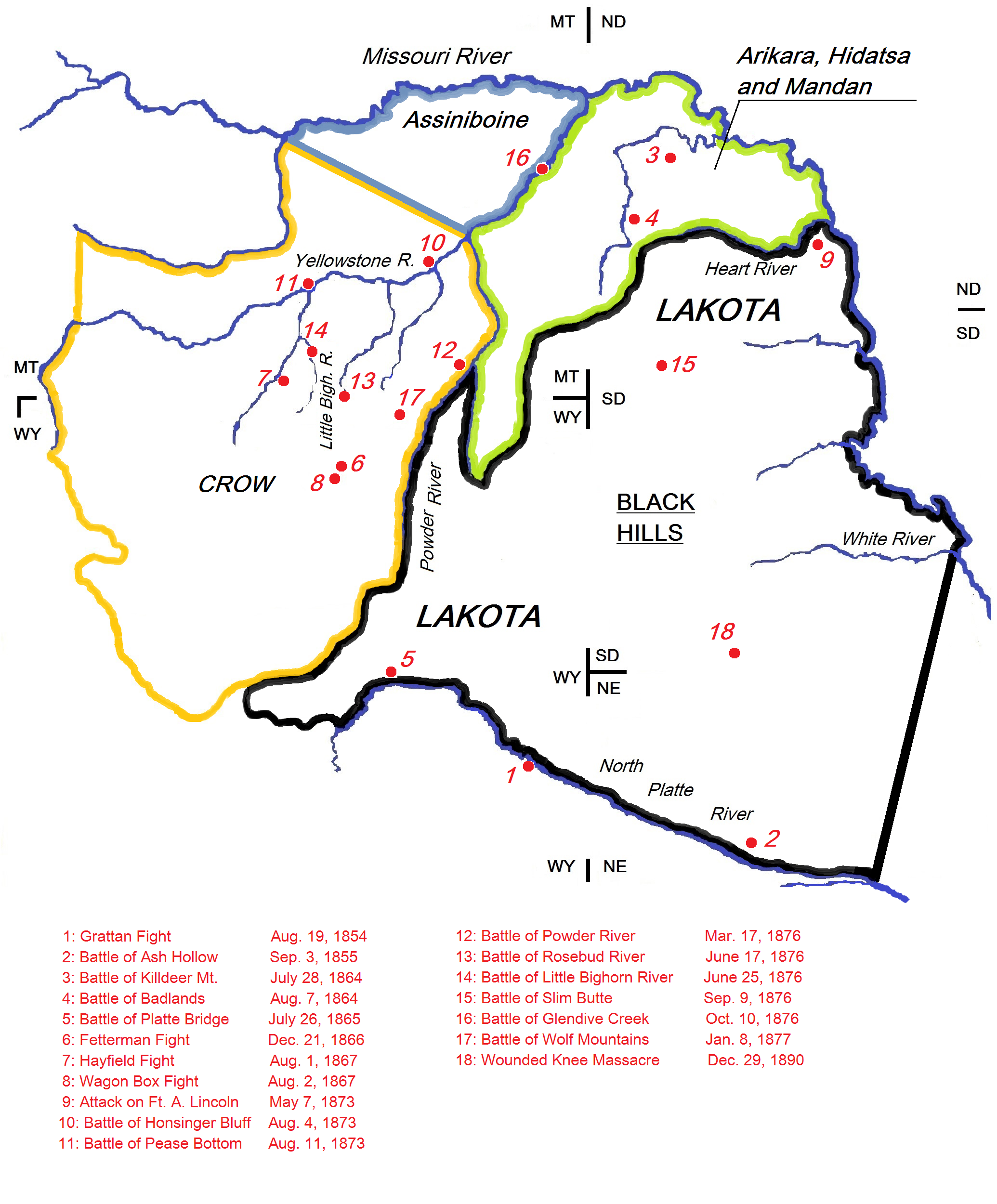
The Lakota Wars (1854–1890). The battlefields and the Lakota treaty territory of 1851 (circa.)

Lakota Indian sovereignty over the Powder River country endured for eight years until renewed US interest in Great Sioux Reservation land due to the discovery of gold in the Black Hills, leading to the Great Sioux War of 1876 and violations of the treaty. In a 1980 Supreme Court case, United States v. Sioux Nation of Indians, the court ruled that tribal lands covered under the treaty had been taken illegally by the US government, and the tribe was owed compensation plus interest. As of 2018 this amounted to more than $1 billion.

The peace of 1868 forced upon the whites allowed the Oglalas and other Lakotas to turn their focus on the intertribal wars again. In November, chief Red Cloud asked the United States for firearms to fight the Crows after the loss of two band members. The Lakotas also "continued their destructive raids" against the Poncas, "resentful of the Poncas living on what was now Sioux land". While using their new treaty right to hunt along the Republican River in United States' territory in the summer of 1873, two big Lakota camps made a large-scale attack on a travelling group of Pawnees in what has ever since been called the Massacre Canyon.

After 1868, Red Cloud lived on the reservation. Seeing that the numbers of new emigrants and technology of the United States would overwhelm the Sioux, Red Cloud adapted to fighting the US Indian Bureau for fair treatment for his people. He was an important leader of the Lakota through the years of transition from their plains culture to the relative confinement of the reservation system. He outlived all the major Lakota leaders of the Indian wars. He lived until 1909, when he died on the Pine Ridge Reservation and was buried there.

Fetterman, Brown and the U.S. soldiers killed in the 1866 Fetterman Fight were reinterred at the U.S. National Cemetery at Little Bighorn Battlefield National Monument, near Crow Agency, Montana.
