= Bozeman Trail =

Protected area

The Bozeman Trail
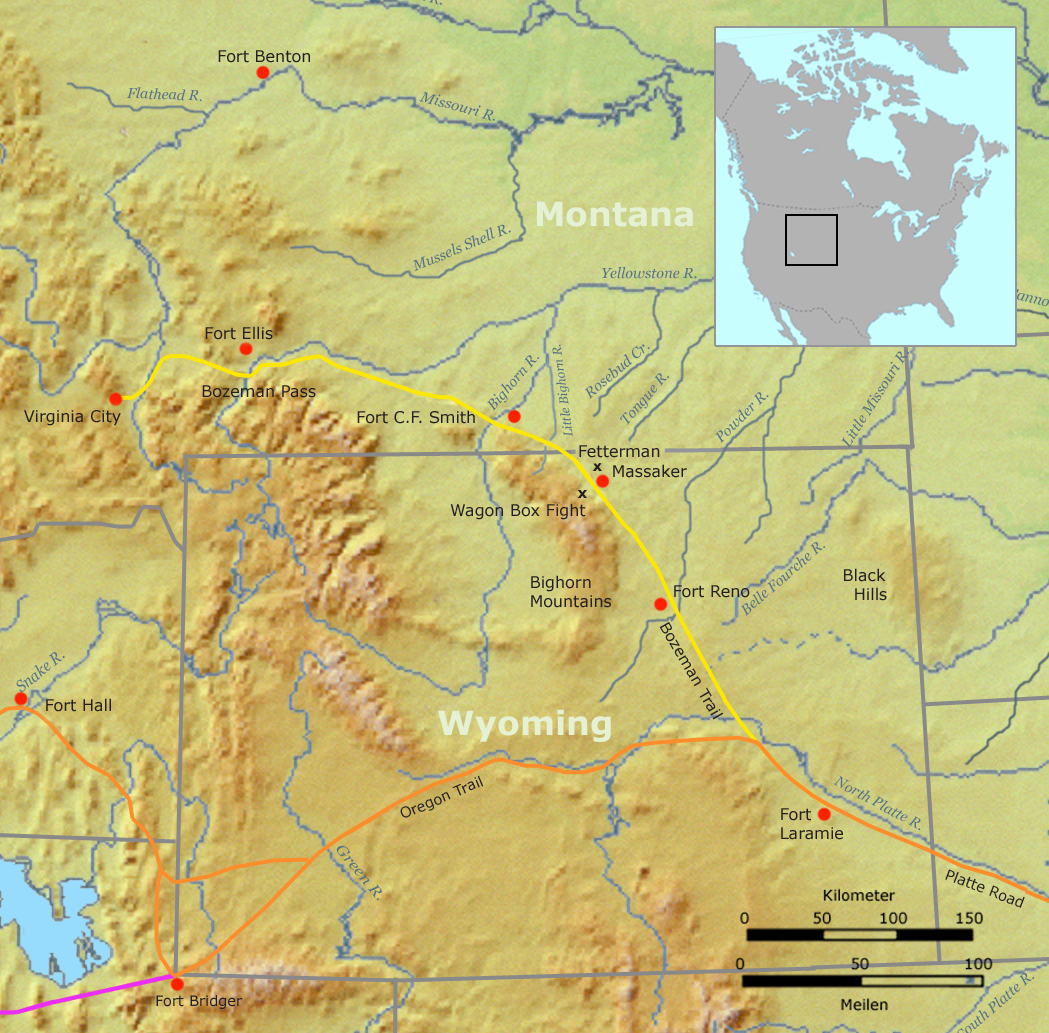
- The Bozeman Trail (in yellow). While the route was in use, it largely crossed the 1851 Crow Indian treaty-guaranteed territory west of Powder River.
- Location: Montana, Wyoming
- Governing body: National Park Service

The Bozeman Trail was an overland route in the Western United States, connecting the gold rush territory of southern Montana to the Oregon Trail in eastern Wyoming. Its important period was from 1863 to 1868. While the major part of the route used by Bozeman Trail travelers in 1864 was pioneered by Allen Hurlbut, it was named after John Bozeman. Many miles of the Bozeman Trail in present Montana followed the tracks of Bridger Trail, opened by Jim Bridger in 1864.

The flow of pioneers and settlers through territory of Native Americans provoked fear and anger in the local tribes; some of whom chose to respond with aggressive, and even violent action. The challengers to the route were newly arrived Lakotas and their Native allies, the Arapahoe and the Cheyenne. The United States put emphasis on a right to "establish roads, military and other posts" as described in Article 2 in the Fort Laramie Treaty of 1851. All parties in the conflict had signed that treaty. The Crow Natives held the treaty right to the contested area and had called it their homeland for decades. They sided with the whites. The U.S. Army undertook several military campaigns against the hostile Natives to try to control the trail. Because of its association with frontier history and conflict with American Natives, various segments of the trail are listed on the National Register of Historic Places (NRHP).

== Establishment ==
In 1863, John Bozeman and John Jacobs scouted for a direct route from Virginia City, Montana to central Wyoming to connect with the Oregon Trail, then the major passage to the West Coast. Before this, most access to the southwestern Montana Territory was from St. Louis via the Missouri River to Fort Benton. Thence travelers went by the 'Benton Road,' around the Great Falls and through the Chestnut, Hilger and Prickly Pear valleys (current site of Helena and Broadwater County, Montana).

The overland Bozeman Trail followed many north–south trails the American Natives had used since prehistoric times to travel through Powder River Country. This route was more direct and better watered than any previous trail into Montana. Bozeman's and Jacobs's most important contribution was to improve the trail so that it was wide enough for wagons. But there was a major drawback — the trail passed directly through territory occupied by the Shoshone, Arapaho, and Lakota nations.

Decades before the Bozeman Trail cut through the plains of present Wyoming, the expanse "... was made busy by Crows and white trappers and traders ...". According to the Fort Laramie Treaty of 1851, most of the Bozeman Trail ran across native Crow territory established by treaty. "For the Crows, the Bozeman Trail introduced them to a relationship [emigrants and army personnel] that would profoundly affect the tribe in coming decades".

To complicate the matter, the southeastern part of the 1851 Crow domain was taken over by the Arapahoe, the Cheyenne and the Lakota. They had invaded the western Powder River area during the 1850s and after "large scale battles" won this buffalo rich Native land from the original tribe around 1860. The principal Bozeman Trail conflict took place along the roughly 250 miles (400 km) of southern wagon wheel tracks through this particular area. Usually, the emigrants could breathe again, when they started on the last nearly 190 miles (310 km) of the trail westward from the crossing of the Bighorn River to the city of Bozeman.

== The trail and travelers ==
During the few years the trail was open to emigrants, 3,500 traveled it. Natives killed between 40 and 50 of them. The short cut was at the time "most often called the road to Montana" and not the Bozeman Trail. While short in bee line, the actual road from the Oregon Trail to the mining towns was much longer due to the hilly and undulating terrain. Shorter or longer stretches of the route were altered every year to avoid the worst stages. The journey took around eight weeks. Many of the travelers had prepared themselves for the arduous trip by reading John Lyle Campbell's popular guidebook. Drowning and fatal accidents with firearms occurred. Some travelers came down with critical diseases such as "mountain fever" (Colorado tick fever) and never made it to their destination. Game including elk, mountain sheep and bear was shot an occasion, also buffalo. "The men are killing them in large numbers. I feel sorry to see such destruction. They leave tons of good meat every day to be devoured by wolfs at night", lamented traveler Richard Owen in 1864. The travelers grouped in organized "trains" with chosen people holding posts such as captain, train marshal and orderly sergeant. One group, known as the Townsend Wagon Train, led by Captain A. A. Townsend of Wisconsin, was made up of "wagons ... 150, men ... 375, women ... 36, children ... 36, oxen ... 636". Every fifth of those crossing the plains via Bozeman Trail was a woman or a child. Each wagon paid the train pilot, maybe six dollars in 1864. Being a route used by single emigrants and small families at first, the trail transformed towards a supply route with freight wagons carrying equipment and necessities of life to the new, western towns.

== First travelers and Native American campaigns ==
Bozeman led the first wagon train on the trail in 1864. Abasalom Austin Townsend was captain of another very large wagon train (over 400 people and 150+ wagons) and had a battle with the Natives. Known as the Townsend Wagon Train Fight, the attack occurred on July 7, 1864, with casualties on both sides. Native raids on white settlers increased dramatically from 1864 to 1866, which prompted the U.S. government to order the Army to carry out military campaigns against the Shoshone. Patrick Edward Connor led several of the earliest campaigns, including the Bear River Massacre. and the Powder River Expedition of 1865. He also fought the Arapaho at the Battle of the Tongue River.

The trail itself diverged from the Oregon and California Trails to the north through the Powder River. Lieutenant General William Tecumseh Sherman authorized construction of three forts in 1866 to guard travelers on the trail. Soldiers were harassed by the Sioux, at that time led by Red Cloud (the United States named the war Red Cloud's War after the Sioux leader). Colonel Henry B. Carrington was stationed at a halfway point between Fort Laramie and the Bozeman Trail, but his well-fortified position was not attacked directly. However, when Captain William J. Fetterman, acting against orders, led soldiers in retaliation for attacks against Fort Phil Kearny; all eighty of Fetterman's men were killed. In the aftermath of the Fetterman Fight, the United States agreed, a part of the Fort Laramie Treaty of 1868, to abandon its forts along the Bozeman Trail.

== Post-Civil War travel ==
In 1866, after the American Civil War ended, the number of settlers who used the trail en route to Montana gold fields increased. Around 1,200 wagons brought some 2,000 people to the city of Bozeman following the trail that year. The U.S. Army called a council at Fort Laramie, which Lakota leader Red Cloud attended. The U.S. Army wanted to negotiate a right-of-way with the Lakota for settlers' use of the trail. As negotiations continued, Red Cloud became outraged when he discovered that a regiment of U.S. infantry was already using the route without receiving permission from the Lakota nation. Thus Red Cloud's War began.

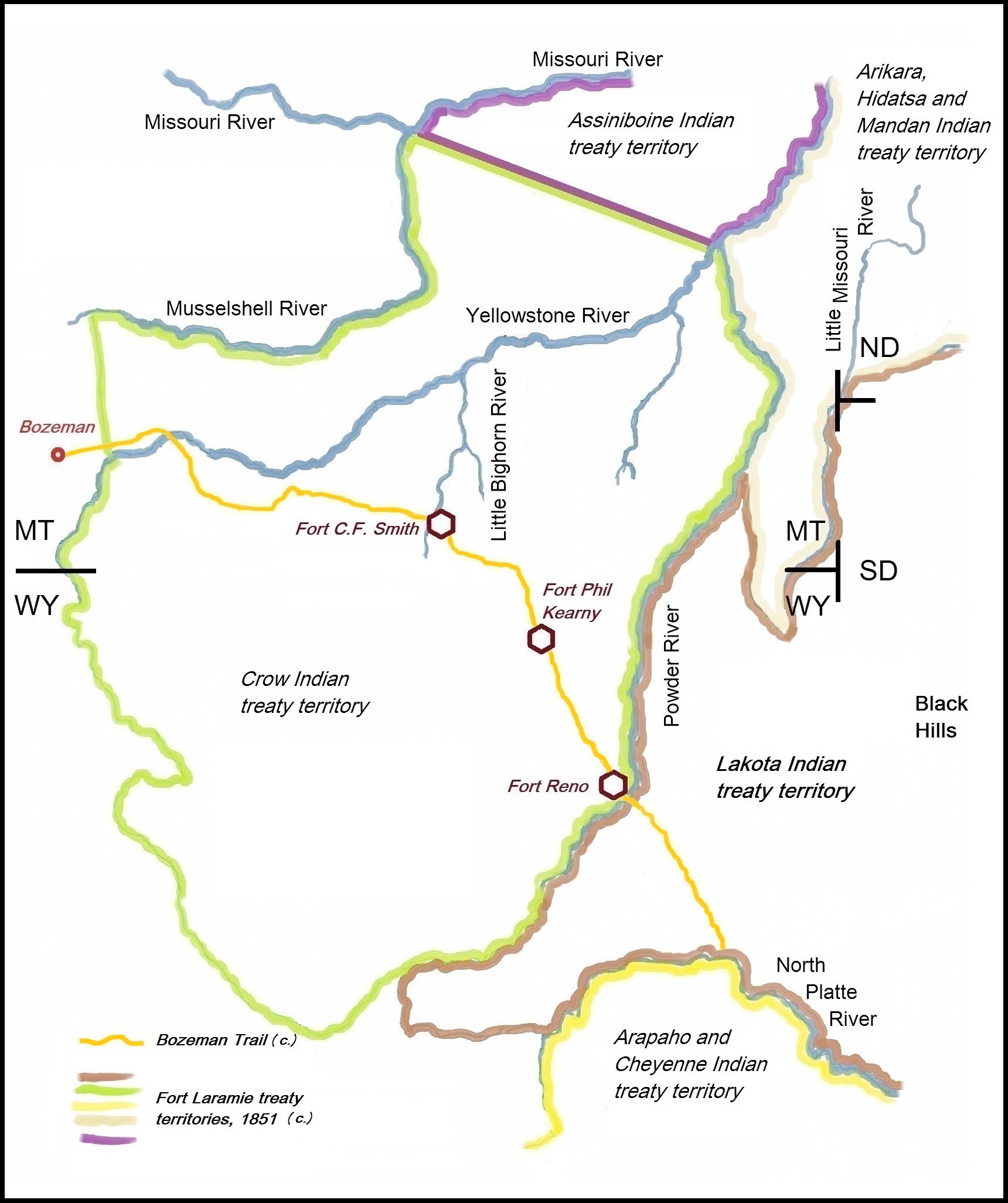
Bozeman Trail, Fort C.F. Smith, Fort Phil Kearny and Fort Reno and relevant Indian territories of 1851. All three military forts along the Bozeman Trail were located in Crow Indian treaty territory, which had been invaded by buffalo hunting Lakotas.

It was impossible for the army to undertake significant negotiations about the traffic through the western Powder River area and the future use of it with Red Cloud and any other Lakota. In 1851, the United States had acknowledged the tract belonged to the Crow and was obliged by that. The Lakota tribe itself had recognized the same.

That same year, Nelson Story, a successful Virginia City, Montana, gold miner originally from Ohio, used the Bozeman Trail to successfully drive about 1,000 head of longhorn cattle into Montana. The U.S. Army unsuccessfully tried to turn Story back to protect the drive from Native American attacks, but Story brought cattle through to the Gallatin Valley and formed one of the earliest significant herds in Montana's cattle industry.

The U.S. Army established Fort Reno, Fort Phil Kearny and Fort C. F. Smith along the route, staffed with troops meant to protect travelers. All three military posts were built west of Powder River, consequently outside the Lakota territory as recognized by the whites in the Fort Laramie Treaty. " ... the Sioux attacked the United States anyway, claiming that the Yellowstone was now their land". Native American raids along the trail and around the forts continued. When the Lakota annihilated a detachment under William J. Fetterman at the Fetterman Fight near Fort Phil Kearny on December 21, 1866, civilian travel along the trail ceased. On August 1, 1867, and August 2, 1867, U.S. forces resisted coordinated attempts by large parties of Lakota and Cheyenne to overrun Fort C. F. Smith and Fort Phil Kearny in the Hayfield Fight and Wagon Box Fight.

The strikes and attacks on the soldiers "appeared to be a great Sioux war to protect their land. And it was - but the Sioux had only recently conquered this land from other tribes and now defending the territory both from other tribes and from the advance of white settlers". "In 1866, Red Cloud and his alliance of Lakotas, Cheyennes, and Arapahos fought for a territory they had dominated for only a few years".

The troops in Fort Phil Kearny and Fort C. F. Smith got from time to time warnings of imminent attacks from the Crow, who also brought information about the location of Lakota camps. The Crows were all but pleased to see a part of their treaty-guaranteed land taken over by hereditary enemies, the Arapahoes, Cheyennes, and Lakotas. Despite resentment against the traffic on the Bozeman Trail, "the Crows still acted as allies of the harassed troops" in the forts.

Later, by the 1868 Treaty of Fort Laramie, the U.S. recognized the Powder River Country as unceded hunting territory for the Lakota and allied tribes. Most was located on former Crow treaty territory, now by conquest converted into new Lakota country. For a time the government used the treaty to shut down travel by European American settlers on the Bozeman Trail. President Ulysses S. Grant ordered the abandonment of forts along the trail.

Red Cloud's War could thus be said to be the only Native American war in which Native Americans achieved their goals (if only for a brief time) with a treaty settlement essentially on their terms. By 1876, however, following the Black Hills War, the U.S. Army reopened the trail. The U.S. Army continued to use the trail during later military campaigns and built a telegraph line along it.

== Modern route ==
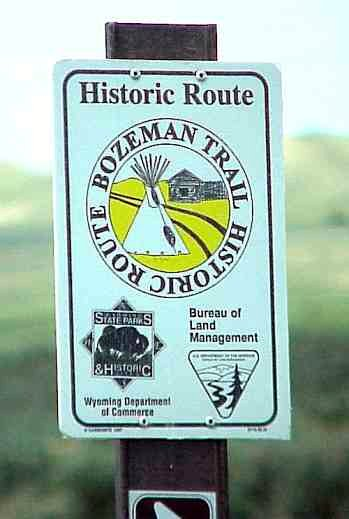
Bozeman Trail marker, Wyoming, 2003

Today, a modern highway route covers roughly the same general route as the historic Bozeman Trail. The route consists of Interstate 25 from Douglas, Wyoming to Buffalo, Wyoming; Interstate 90 from Buffalo via Sheridan, Wyoming to Bozeman, Montana MT Hwy 84; and U.S. Route 287 to Virginia City, Montana.

== See also ==
- Powder River Expeditions

== Bibliography ==
- "Bozeman Trail History", Fort Phil Kearny State Historic Site
- Grace Raymond Hebard, et al., The Bozeman Trail: Historical Accounts of the Blazing of the Overland Routes, Volume II

NRHP Place	NRHP Number	County	State
Antelope Creek Crossing	89000816	Converse	Wyoming
Holdup Hollow Segment	89000818	Converse	Wyoming
Lake Desmet Segment	89000814	Johnson	Wyoming
Nine Mile Segment	89000813	Campbell	Wyoming
Powder River Station	89000810	Campbell	Wyoming
Ross Flat Segment	89000811	Converse	Wyoming
Sage Creek Station	89000812	Converse	Wyoming
Stinking Water Gulch Segment	89000817	Converse	Wyoming
Trabing Station-Crazy Woman Crossing	89000815	Johnson	Wyoming
Yellowstone Crossing	78003407	Sweet Grass	Montana
