= Fort C. F. Smith (Fort Smith, Montana) =

- Fort C. F. Smith Historic District
- U.S. National Register of Historic Places
- U.S. Historic district
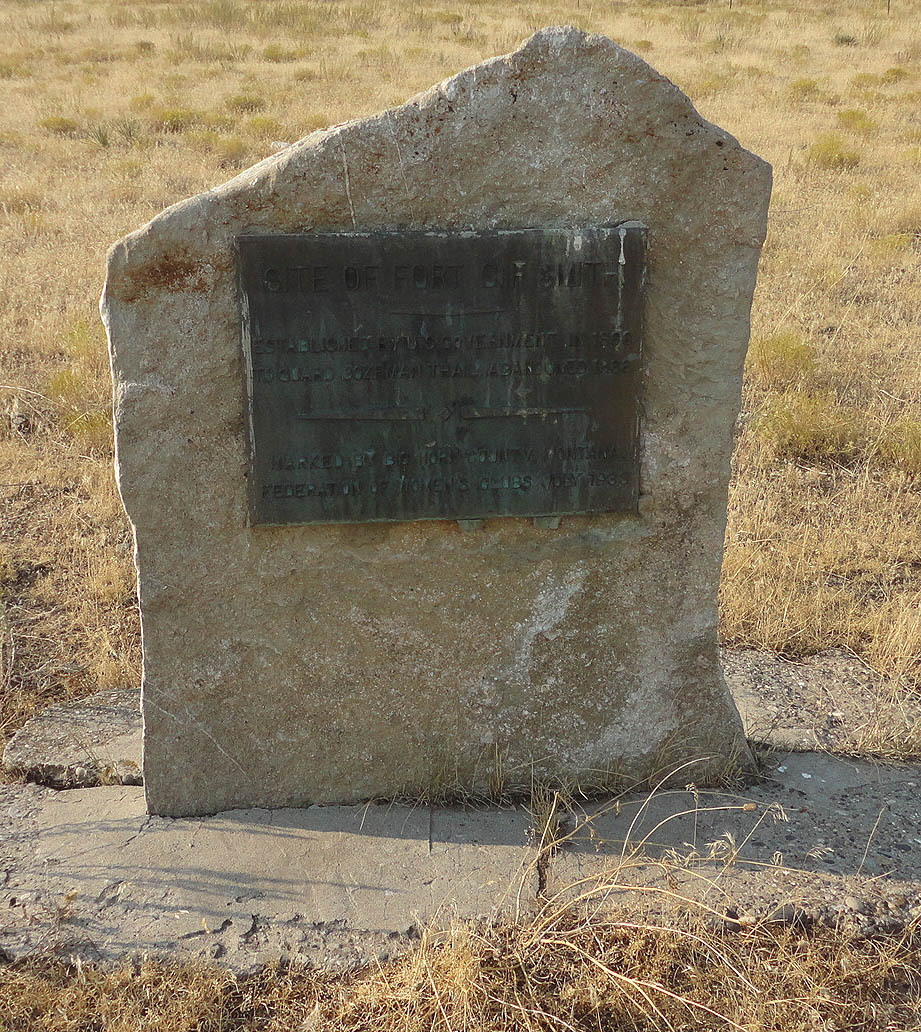
- Fort C. F. Smith historical marker

- Location within Montana Location within the United States
- Nearest city: Fort Smith, Montana
- Coordinates: 45°17′59″N 107°54′59″W
- Area: 307 acres (124 ha)
- Built: 1860
- NRHP reference No.: 75000163
- Added to NRHP: October 10, 1975

Fort C. F. Smith was a military post established in the Powder River country by the United States Army in the southern portion of the Montana Territory on August 12, 1866, during Red Cloud's War. Established by order of Col. Henry B. Carrington, it was one of five forts proposed to protect the Bozeman Trail against the Oglala Lakota (Sioux), who saw the trail as a violation of the earlier 1851 Treaty of Fort Laramie. The fort was abandoned two years later in 1868 and burned by the returning Sioux under Red Cloud.

== History ==
The U.S. Army was ordered by the United States Department of War in the national capital of Washington, D.C. to build at least four additional forts in the Montana Territory (future State of Montana) to protect the Bozeman trail and wagon road after travel had become hazardous for any but the largest and best-armed parties. Colonel Henry B. Carrington (1824–1912), was given command of the effort, planning Fort C.F. Smith at the crossing of the Bighorn River, along with additional posts of Fort Phil Kearny to the east of the Bighorn Mountains, and Fort Reno on the Powder River. A fourth planned fort on the Clark Fork River was never built. It was the third Army post to hold the name of Gen. C. F. Smith (previous others in Arlington County, Virginia and in Bowling Green, Kentucky)., who was killed in the American Civil War (1861–1865).

Originally named Fort Ransom, the post was renamed in commemoration of Major General Charles Ferguson Smith (1807–1862). It included a 125-foot square stockade made of adobe and wood for protection, with bastions for concentrated defense. Two companies of the 18th Infantry Regiment (approximately 90–100 officers and men) were stationed at Fort Smith during 1866, and during the following year of 1867, the garrison complement was increased and consisted of 400 men of the 27th Infantry.

A large Sioux party unsuccessfully attacked civilian hay cutters guarded by 20 soldiers near the Fort in the Hayfield Fight in its second year of occupation in 1867. The Army finally abandoned Fort C.F. Smith after constant Indian protests and demands as a condition of the subsequent negotiated April 29 – November 6, 1868, of the second Fort Laramie Treaty of 1868.

The site of the fort is located on currently private land, on what is today the Crow Indian Reservation. It is just outside the nearby small town of Fort Smith, Montana. Since most of the old fort's buildings were made of adobe, after a century and a half, as of 2010, the foundations of the structures can still be seen as low earthen mounds rising a foot or two off the pasture. By looking carefully, the arrangement of buildings around the perimeter of the old parade ground can be discerned. A stone monument in the approximate center of the parade ground (placed in the 1930s) commemorates the fort site and briefly describes its history and significance.. A wooden sign, in poor repair, marks the passing wagon route of the Bozeman Trail.

Fort C.F. Smith was listed on the National Register of Historic Places (maintained by the National Park Service of the United States Department of the Interior) in 1975. It is included within Bighorn Canyon National Recreation Area, with 307 acres (124 ha) including six contributing sites.

== See also ==
- List of military installations in Montana
