= John Bozeman =

American pioneer in Montana (1837–1867)

John M. Bozeman
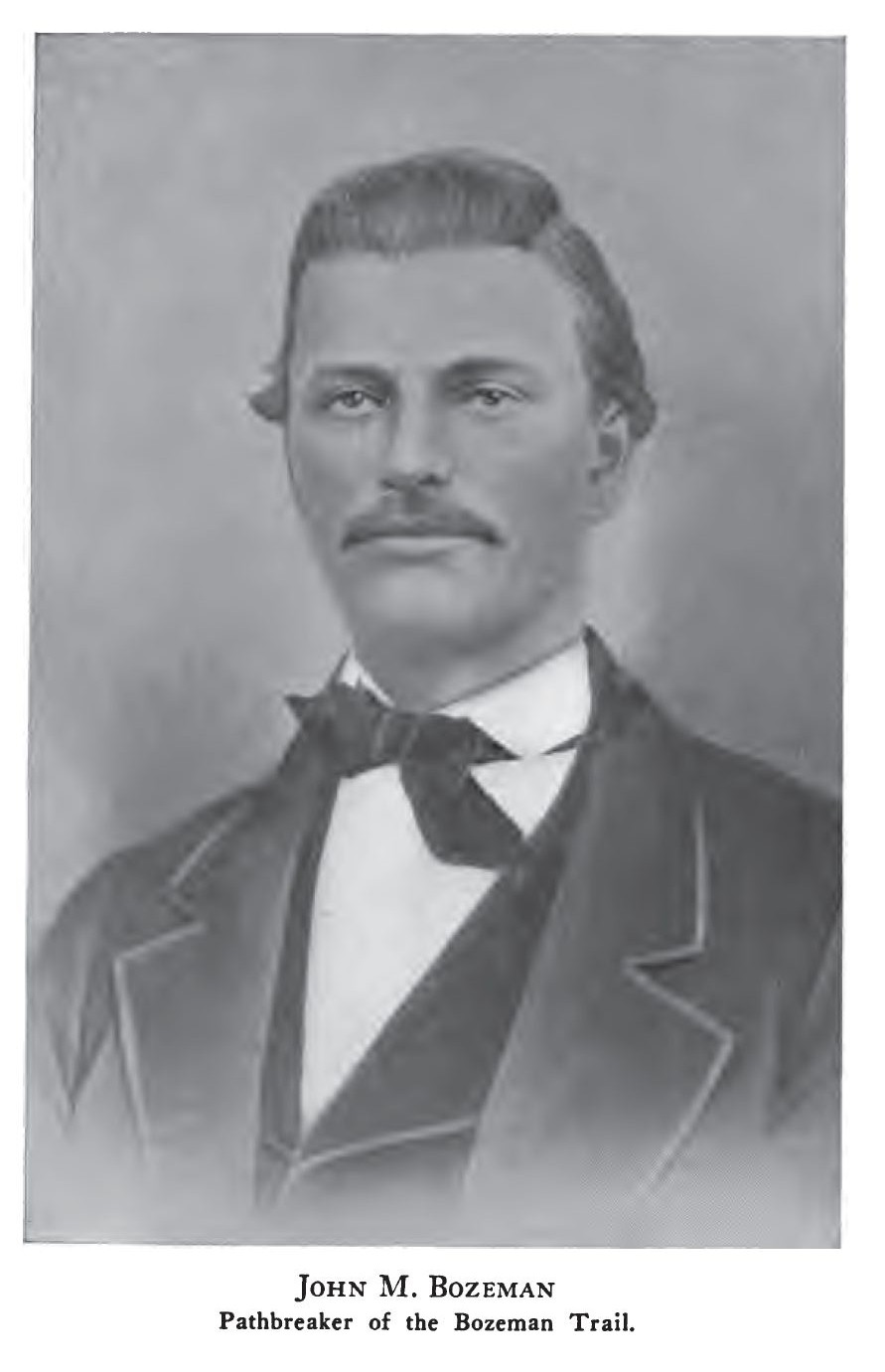
- John Bozeman from The Bozeman Trail, Vol II (1922)
- Born: January 1835; Pickens County, Georgia, U.S.
- Died: April 20, 1867 (aged 32); Yellowstone River, Montana Territory, U.S.
- Resting place: Sunset Hills Cemetery; Bozeman, Montana
- Occupations: Explorer, trail guide, merchant

John Merin Bozeman (January 1835 – April 20, 1867) was an American pioneer and frontiersman in the American West who helped establish the Bozeman Trail through Wyoming Territory into the gold fields of southwestern Montana Territory in the early 1860s. He helped found the city of Bozeman, Montana, in 1864, which is named for him.

== Life ==
Bozeman was born in Pickens County, Georgia, in January 1835 to William and Delila Sims Bozeman.

Bozeman married Lucinda Catherine Ingram, and the couple had three daughters. In 1860, John Bozeman headed west to join in the Pike's Peak Gold Rush in Colorado, leaving behind his wife and children. After his mining claims in Colorado failed, Bozeman traveled to Deer Lodge in western Montana Territory in 1862 to work the gold fields discovered by James and Granville Stuart. Bozeman later joined the January 1863 rush to newly discovered gold in Bannack, Montana, but his claims there proved unsuccessful.

Seeing that it would be more profitable to "mine the miners" than to mine for gold, Bozeman enlisted the support of another unsuccessful Bannack prospector and friend, John Jacobs, to explore a new and shorter route into Montana Territory from the east. In 1863, he and John Jacobs blazed the Bozeman Trail, a cutoff route from the Oregon Trail in Wyoming to Bannack, Montana, and guided miners to Virginia City through the Gallatin Valley. Bozeman settled in the Gallatin Valley at a site "standing right in the gate of the mountains, ready to swallow up all tenderfeet that would reach the territory from the east, with their golden fleeces to be taken care of". The route spanned the eastern front of the Rockies north to the Yellowstone River, then west across the Bozeman Pass. In 1864, he laid out the town of Bozeman, Montana. Its proximity to the trail helped it to grow in the following years, especially as migration to Montana increased after the discovery of gold at Virginia City in 1864.

In 1865, federal troops began guarding the trail from hostile Indian attacks, since the trail ran through lands reserved by treaty to Indian tribes. The federal government constructed Forts Reno, Phil Kearny, and C. F. Smith to defend the trail. The Sioux tribe "succeeded by closing the road by a massacre near Fort Kearny" in 1866. The trail was briefly abandoned.

== Death ==
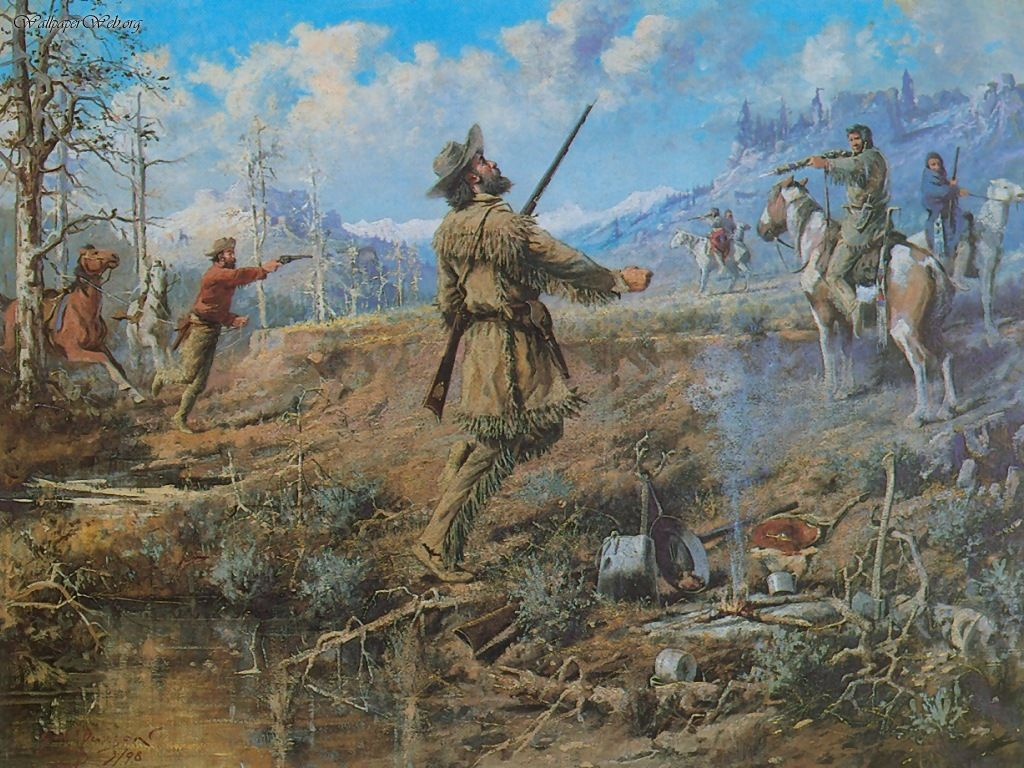
The Death Of John Bozeman by Edgar Samuel Paxson

Bozeman was murdered on April 20, 1867 (aged 32), while traveling along the Yellowstone River to Fort C.F. Smith to secure a flour contract. His partner, Tom Cover, reported they had been attacked by a band of Blackfeet Natives, but some historians propose that Bozeman was killed by Cover himself, or perhaps even by a henchman of pioneer Montana rancher Nelson Story named Thomas Kent. The end of Bozeman's life is still a subject of debate today, and some theorize that he was murdered in revenge for his habit of flirting with married women. The Montana Post (Virginia City, Montana) reported on 20 July 1867 that while visiting Blackfoot's (Crow) camp on the Yellowstone, Charlie Smith found that Bear Tooth’s tribe of Crows included expelled Blackfeet tribal members Mountain Chief, his two sons and two nephews with John Bozeman and Tom Cover’s horses. Mountain Chief and his cohorts boasted that they had killed Bozeman and provided details of the attack to Smith that were consistent with Tom Cover’s story. It should be noted Mountain Chief and his braves were expelled from their tribe for killing Chief Little Dog.

== Archives ==
John M. Bozeman's papers are now held by Archives and Special Collections at Montana State University.

== See also ==
- List of unsolved murders
