= Tomahawk (film) =

1951 film

- Theatrical Poster
- Directed by: George Sherman
- Screenplay by: Silvia Richards; Maurice Geraghty
- Based on: story by Daniel Jarrett
- Produced by: Leonard Goldstein
- Starring: Van Heflin; Yvonne De Carlo
- Cinematography: Charles P. Boyle
- Edited by: Danny B. Landres
- Music by: Hans J. Salter
- Color process: Technicolor
- Production company: Universal Pictures
- Distributed by: Universal Pictures
- Release date: February 5, 1951 (United States)
- Running time: 82 minutes
- Country: United States
- Language: English
- Budget: $750,000
- Box office: $2 million (U.S. rentals)

Tomahawk is a 1951 American Western film directed by George Sherman and starring Van Heflin and Yvonne De Carlo. The film is loosely based on events that took place in Wyoming in 1866 to 1868 around Fort Phil Kearny on the Bozeman Trail, such as the Fetterman Fight and Wagon Box Fight. In the UK, the film was released as The Battle of Powder River.

== Plot ==
Jim Bridger, who has the Indian name of "Tomahawk", leads a group of fur traders and Sioux Indians. A small show run by Julie Madden is protected by an escort, led by Lt. Rob Dancy, as it travels cross-country to a fort. On the route, Dancy kills a young unarmed Sioux boy without provocation. In retaliation the following day, several mounted Sioux ambush the traveling show, hitting Julie's elderly companion Dan with an arrow in the chest. They take Dan to the fort, but the doctor refuses to operate. Julie persuades Jim to operate, saving Dan's life. Jim asks Julie to help his female Cheyenne traveling companion Monahseetah, the daughter of Chief Black Kettle.

The Sioux approach the fort in small groups and target one sentry at a time before riding away. Julie has taken a horse without permission and they chase her. Jim tries to stop the men, but one man, Red Cloud's favorite son, will not comply and Jim fights and kills him. When they return to the fort, they can hear the Sioux war drums.

Jim discovers that Dancy killed his Cheyenne wife, Monahseetah's sister, after Dancy leads a suicidal attack on a group of Sioux in which he is the sole survivor. The Sioux attack the fort in waves, but the newly arrived breech-loading rifles defeat them.

== Cast ==
- Van Heflin as Jim Bridger
- Yvonne De Carlo as Julie Madden
- Alex Nicol as 1st. Lt. Rob Dancy
- Preston Foster as Col. Carrington
- Rock Hudson as Cpl. Burt Hanna
- Arthur Space as Capt. William J. Fetterman
- Russ Conway as Maj. Horton
- Stuart Randall as Sgt. Newell
- Jack Oakie as Sol Beckworth
- Tom Tully as Dan Castello
- John War Eagle as Red Cloud
- Susan Cabot as Monahseetah
- Ann Doran as Mrs. Carrington
- John Sitting Bull as Chief American Horse

== Production ==
The film is based on a story by Daniel Jarrett. Universal Pictures purchased the film rights in 1947 and assigned Leonard Goldstein to produce and George Sherman to direct. In August 1948, Universal announced that the film would be among its Technicolor productions for the following year, along with Calamity Jane and Sam Bass, Sierra, Streets of Cairo, Bloomer Girl and Bagdad.

In May 1949, Stephen McNally was announced for the lead but later withdrew and was replaced by Van Heflin in March 1950. In April, Yvonne De Carlo was cast opposite Heflin. Edna Anhalt was originally hired to write the script, but the film's writing credits are assigned to Silvia Richards and Maurice Geraghty.

Shooting began in May 1950. The film was shot partly on location in South Dakota.

== Reception ==
In a contemporary review for The New York Times, critic Bosley Crowther wrote: "'Tomahawk' is nothing exceptional in the cavalry-and-Indians line, outside of its generous intimation of pro-Indian sentiment. The story is strictly two-dimensional, with the conflict narrowly reduced to a rivalry between Mr. Bridger and Lieutenant Dancy, who just loves to kill redskins. The history is hopelessly fuzzy, the Indian fighting and charges are perfunctorily staged and the scenery, while pretty in Technicolor, is nothing to take way your breath."

Critic John L. Scott of the Los Angeles Times called the film "a well-made, exciting movie" and wrote: "Like some other fairly recent pictures of this type, sympathy is generated for the Indians and their efforts to protect their hunting grounds. ... While some of the scenes in 'Tomahawk' are slow paced, there is plenty of action in others."

== Legacy ==
In July 1952, Van Heflin and George Sherman were reported to be working on a follow-up to the film.
