= Henry B. Carrington =

American politician

Henry Beebee Carrington
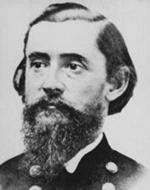
- Henry B. Carrington
- Born: March 2, 1824; Wallingford, Connecticut
- Died: October 26, 1912 (aged 88); Boston, Massachusetts
- Burial place: Fairview Cemetery; Hyde Park, Massachusetts
- Spouse(s): Margaret Irvin Carrington; Frances C. Carrington
- Military career
- Allegiance: United States of America; Union
- Branch: United States Army; Union Army
- Service years: 1861–1870
- Rank: Colonel (USA); Brigadier General (USV)
- Commands: 18th U. S. Infantry; District of Indiana
- Conflicts: American Civil War; Indian Wars
- Other work: Adjutant-General of Ohio author, lawyer

Henry Beebee Carrington (March 2, 1824 – October 26, 1912) was a lawyer, professor, prolific author, and an officer in the United States Army during the American Civil War and in the Old West during Red Cloud's War. A noted engineer, he constructed a series of forts to protect the Bozeman Trail, but suffered a major defeat at the hands of the warchief Red Cloud.

== Early life ==
Carrington was born in Wallingford, Connecticut. An ardent abolitionist in his youth, he was graduated from Yale University in 1845. He was professor of natural science and Greek at the Irving Institute in Tarrytown, New York from 1846 to 1847. Under the influence of the school's founder, Washington Irving, he subsequently wrote Battles of the American Revolution, which appeared in 1876.

In 1847 he studied at Yale Law School while teaching school briefly at a women's institute. The following year he moved to Columbus, Ohio, where he practiced law in partnership with William Dennison, Jr. (who was to become Governor of Ohio in 1860). Carrington was an active anti-slavery Whig, and helped organize the Republican Party in 1854. He became a close friend and supporter of Governor Salmon P. Chase and the latter appointed him Judge Advocate General in 1857. In the next year he became Adjutant-General of Ohio and was charged with reorganizing the state militia.

== Civil War service ==
At the outbreak of the American Civil War Carrington subsequently mustered ten regiments of militia and organized the first twenty-six Ohio regiments. He was commissioned as colonel of the new 18th U.S. Infantry in May 1861 and established Camp Thomas near Columbus.

In August 1862, amid a pressing need for troops, Indiana Governor Oliver P. Morton asked Secretary of War Edwin M. Stanton to send an experienced military bureaucrat to organize new volunteer regiments. The War Department sent Carrington, who quickly organized thousands of new troops and sent them to the front. After he arrived, Carrington became involved in investigations of efforts to discourage enlistments and encourage desertions in the army. In December, he alerted both Morton and President Abraham Lincoln to the efforts of secret organizations that aimed to encourage desertion. Thereafter, Governor Morton found Carrington indispensable and successfully lobbied Stanton to retain him in Indiana. Carrington continued to investigate secret organizations (Knights of the Golden Circle) that harbored deserters, discouraged enlistments, and obstructed the draft. In March 1863, Carrington was promoted to brigadier general and made commander of the District of Indiana of the Department of the Ohio, later renamed the Northern Department.

Carrington continued to serve in Indianapolis as an intelligence officer, developing a network of spies. He also collected information from large numbers of informers around Indiana and neighboring states. His efforts as a spymaster were recognized by the new commander of the Northern Department, Major General Samuel P. Heintzelman, who relied on him and his intelligence findings. Whereas Carrington personally believed that leaders of the secret groups should be arrested and tried in federal civil courts for obstructing the war effort, his wishes were overruled by Governor Morton, Secretary Stanton, and, tacitly, President Lincoln, who chose to try conspirators in military commissions. Carrington assembled evidence for the military prosecution of conspirators in the Indianapolis Treason Trials. He remained in Indianapolis through 1865.

== Red Cloud's War ==
Following the Civil War, the 18th Infantry was stationed in the West. Carrington was then assigned as commander of the Mountain District, Department of the Missouri, in 1866 and moved his regimental headquarters to Colorado. Assigned to protect the Bozeman Trail, he built and personally manned the remote Fort Phil Kearny during Red Cloud's War. Carrington soon lost the respect of his officers due to his lack of aggressiveness in several Indian skirmishes. In December 1866, a force of up to fifteen hundred Indians attacked a wood-cutting detail, then overwhelmed a reaction force of eighty troops under Captain William J. Fetterman. Fetterman, one of Carrington's antagonists, disobeyed his order not to pursue the Indians too far from the fort. Fetterman's force was lured into an ambush and annihilated with no survivors.

Fetterman's popularity, coupled with existing distrust of the colonel's leadership, led to rumors that his men had been ordered into the tragedy. General Ulysses S. Grant moved to court-martial Carrington but, at the suggestion of General William T. Sherman, submitted the matter to a court of inquiry, which subsequently exonerated Carrington, as did a separate investigation by the Department of the Interior. Nevertheless, Carrington had been relieved of command immediately after the disaster, so that his military career was effectively ruined.

In 1868, Margaret Carrington (his wife) published her story about Fort Phil Kearny in a book titled Absaraka, home of the Crows. After Margaret's death in 1870, Carrington brought out new editions of the book with expanded details of his experiences; the book eventually went through seven editions. In 1870, Carrington retired from active service and was appointed professor of military science at Wabash College in Indiana, serving until 1878 when he moved to Hyde Park in Boston, Massachusetts. In 1871, Carrington married Frances Grummond, the widow of Lt. George W. Grummond who was killed in the Fetterman massacre.

Carrington received the degree of LL. D. from Wabash College in 1873. In 1889, he traveled to Montana to negotiate the removal of the Bitterroot Salish from their ancestral homeland to the Flathead Indian Reservation. In 1890, he conducted a detailed census of the Six Nations in New York and the Cherokee Nation. In 1908, Carrington and his second wife, Frances C. Carrington, were honored in Sheridan, Wyoming, and Carrington spoke at the Fetterman massacre site memorial. With Carrington's help, Frances authored Army Life on the Plains in 1910, detailing their experiences at Fort Phil Kearny.

== Carrington's publications ==
- The Scourge of the Alps (1847)
- Russia Among the Nations and American Classics (1849)
- Battles of the American Revolution, 1775-81 (1876)
- Crisis Thoughts (1878)
- Battle Maps and Charts of the American Revolution (1881)
- The Indian Question (1884)
- Battles of the Bible
- Boston and New York, 1775 and 1776 (1885)
- Washington the Soldier (1899)
- The Exodus of the Flat Head Indians (1902).
- Absaraka, Home of the Crows: Being the Experience of an Officer's Wife on the Plains (1868) was written by Carrington's first wife, Margaret, and published in at least eight editions, based on a daily journal kept at the suggestion of Gen. William T. Sherman
- My Army Life and the Fort Phil. Kearney Massacre, With an Account of the Celebration of "Wyoming Opened,". (1910) was written by Carrington's second wife, Frances.

== Television portrayal ==
Actor Roy Engel portrayed Carrington in the 1958 episode, "Old Gabe," referring to a nickname of the famous mountain man Jim Bridger, on the syndicated anthology series, Death Valley Days, hosted by The Old Ranger, Stanley Andrews. Harry Shannon played an aging Jim Bridger, who returns home to Missouri to find that his wife has died in childbirth, and son Felix played by Ron Hagerthy is trying to keep their farm despite an unpaid mortgage. Even with failing eyesight(glaucoma), Bridger sets out on a last scouting expedition for Col. Carrington to make peace with the Sioux and open the Oregon Trail. From this last venture in 1866, he earns enough to retire the mortgage.

== See also ==
- List of American Civil War generals (Union)
- Judge Charles H. Constable
