= High Backbone =

Lakota leader (c. 1820–1870)

High Backbone or Hump
- Canku Wakatuya

Miniconjou Lakota leader

Personal details
- Born: c. 1820
- Died: 1870
- Spouse(s): At least two Cheyenne wives, and one Crow wife
- Relations: Sister, Rattling Blanket Woman (half-sister, married Crazy Horse's father, Worm)
- Children: Hump II
- Parent: Black Buffalo (1760–1820) (father)
- Known for: Leader in the Wagon Box Fight and the Fetterman Fight, mentor to Crazy Horse

High Backbone also called Hump, or Canku Wakatuya (c. 1820 – 1870) was a Miniconjou Lakota military leader. He led troops in the Wagon Box Fight and the Fetterman Fight.

== Mentor to Crazy Horse ==
Canku Wakatuya was known as the mentor of the young Crazy Horse. Their ages relative to each other vary according to different sources. He Dog told Eleanor Hinman that Hump was about the same age as Crazy Horse. In contrast, Charles Eastman described Hump as considerably older, perhaps by five or ten years. This confusion may stem from the fact that Crazy Horse's father, Worm, had been called Tashunka Witko (Crazy Horse) at one time, and was additionally considered a "kola" (blood brother) of Hump.

== Red Cloud's War, 1866–1868 ==
During Red Cloud's War, Hump / High Backbone played a strategic role in the Fetterman Fight, December 21, 1866. It is possible that he was also named as wicasa itančaŋ and blotahunka of the Minneconju at this time.

The older civilian leaders of the Lakota had been cast aside by the younger warriors during the skirmishes on the Bozeman Trail, and replaced with more decisive and successful warriors. Red Cloud positioned himself among the Oglala in a leadership role. Together with Crazy Horse, he led the united Lakota warriors in the Wagon Box Fight. However, this battle was a military failure. The Lakota did not fight as an organized unit, but rather as a group of individual warriors. This style of fighting, in combination with their inferior weaponry, resulted in the US soldiers being able to fend them off. Despite high losses on the Lakota side, neither the US soldiers nor the Lakota viewed the battle as a victory.

After the Treaty of Fort Laramie in 1868, Hump maintained his position as a respected war chief (blotahunka). Hump / High Backbone was killed in the Fall or Winter of 1870 during an attack on the Shoshone, in the presence of Crazy Horse.

== Bibliography ==
- Bray, Kingsley M. (2006) Crazy Horse - A Lakota Life. University of Oklahoma Press. ISBN 0-8061-3785-1.
- Eastman, Charles: Indian Heroes and Great Chieftains. Little, Brown, 1918 (online).
- Lutz, Gregor (2009) (in German) Das Who-is-Who der Teton Sioux. BoD, Norderstedt. ISBN 978-3-8391-1844-3.
- Lutz, Gregor, Tatanka Oyate. (2009) (in German) Die Lakota - Amerikas vergessene Kinder. BoD, Norderstedt. ISBN 978-3-8370-9888-4.
- Sandoz, Mari (1942) Crazy Horse, the Strange Man of the Oglalas, a biography. University of Nebraska Press. ISBN 0-8032-9211-2.
