= Oliver Red Cloud =

Spiritual leader of Oglala Sioux tribe

Oliver Red Cloud (November 30, 1919 – July 4, 2013) was a chief of the Oglala Sioux. Oliver Red Cloud is a direct descendant of Chief Red Cloud. He was the spiritual leader of the tribe for many years and very active in tribal affairs as well as the annual pow wow. He worked hard to instill spiritual values and rituals. He spoke at length during the annual pow wows every August. This pow wow of dancing and friendship is one of the largest in the USA open to all. He became Chief of the Oglala Lakota, also known as the Oglala Sioux, in 1977 at the death of his father Charles Red Cloud.

He died on July 4, 2013, at age 93 in Denver, Colorado. Steve Emery, Red Cloud's nephew stated that his uncle, "was passionate about making sure the kids knew the Lakota ways and that they knew about the treaty, the 1868 treaty, the 1851 treaty, and the special relationship that exists between the United States and the Great Sioux Nation.”
