= William J. Fetterman =

United States Army officer

William Judd Fetterman
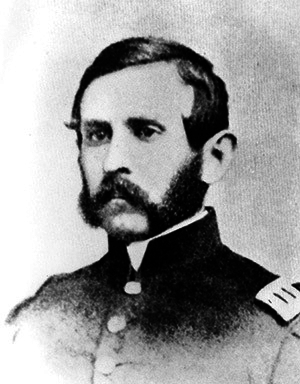
- Capt. William J. Fetterman
- Born: 1833? New London, Connecticut (disputed)
- Died: December 21, 1866 (aged 33); Near Fort Phil Kearny, Wyoming
- Burial place: National Cemetery, Little Bighorn Battlefield National Monument
- Military career
- Allegiance: United States of America; Union
- Branch: United States Army; Union Army
- Service years: 1861 – 1866
- Rank: Captain
- Unit: 18th Infantry Regiment
- Wars: American Civil War; Indian Wars: Red Cloud's War

William Judd Fetterman (c. 1833 – December 21, 1866) was an officer in the United States Army during the American Civil War and the subsequent Red Cloud's War on the Great Plains. Fetterman was killed along with his command of 80 men in the Fetterman Fight.

== Early life ==
William Fetterman, born in 1833 in Cheshire, Connecticut, was the son of Army Lieutenant George Fetterman and Anna Maria Judd. George Fetterman graduated from West Point on 1 July 1827 and served in the Army Artillery. At the time of William's birth, Lieutenant Fetterman was assigned to Fort Trumbull, New London, Connecticut.

On April 26, 1835, William's mother Anna Judd Fetterman died. One year later, on May 31, 1836, after nine years of military service, William's father George Fetterman resigned his Army commission and returned to Pittsburgh, Pennsylvania. There he worked as a civil engineer and served in the Pennsylvania militia. George Fetterman died in Pittsburgh in 1844.

== Military career ==
Fetterman enlisted in the Union Army on May 14, 1861, in Delaware, and was promptly commissioned a first lieutenant. He served with the US 18th Infantry Regiment throughout the war and was twice brevetted for meritorious service and gallant conduct, finishing the war as a lieutenant colonel by brevet.

During the Atlanta campaign in 1864, Fetterman commanded the 2nd Battalion of the 18th US Infantry. This unit was part of John H. King's 2nd Brigade, Richard W. Johnson's 1st Division, John M. Palmer's XIV Corps, George Henry Thomas' Army of the Cumberland. According to Fetterman's report in the Official Records, the 2nd Battalion skirmished at Buzzard Roost Gap and Resaca. In fighting near Pickett's Mill on May 31, the battalion sustained a loss of 1 officer and 33 men wounded. The battalion skirmished at the Battle of Kennesaw Mountain and took part in an attack that overran a line of Confederate rifle pits on July 4. After July 5, the companies of the 2nd Battalion were merged with the 1st Battalion of the 18th US Infantry. Fetterman subsequently was assigned as Assistant Adjutant General of the 2nd Brigade and reported on a successful attack at the Battle of Jonesborough on September 1. In this action, the 18th US Infantry suffered losses of 43 killed or wounded and 8 missing out of the 269 officers and men it took into battle.

After the war, Fetterman chose to remain in the Regular Army and was assigned as a captain in the Second Battalion of the 18th Infantry Regiment. In November 1866, the regiment was stationed at Fort Phil Kearny, tasked with protecting immigrants traveling to the gold fields of Montana Territory along the Bozeman Trail. Fetterman allegedly boasted that with 80 soldiers, he could "ride through the whole Sioux nation."

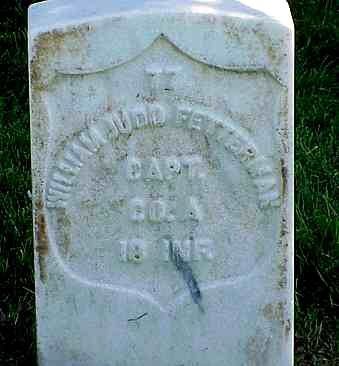
William J. Fetterman's Headstone, Little Bighorn National Cemetery

On December 21, 1866, a large band of Cheyenne and Sioux – which included Crazy Horse – under the leadership of Red Cloud attacked a wood train near the fort. Despite his unfamiliarity with frontier conditions and the methods of Indian fighting, Fetterman took command of a composite reaction force consisting of the former battalion quartermaster, Captain Frederick Brown, 2nd Lt. George Grummond, 49 enlisted troops of the 18th Infantry, 27 men of the 2nd Cavalry, and 2 civilian scouts, totaling 80 men. Ignoring his orders not to venture beyond Lodge Trail Ridge (out of sight and support distance from the fort), Fetterman pursued a small band of Sioux and was lured into an ambush. He found himself facing approximately 2,000 Indians. Within 20 minutes, Fetterman and his command had been wiped out.

The Fetterman Fight, as the encounter became known, was second in notoriety only to Custer's disastrous defeat in 1876. It led to the dismissal of Fetterman's commanding officer Henry B. Carrington, who was initially blamed for the disaster but was eventually exonerated.

Fetterman's grave is in the National Cemetery at the Little Bighorn Battlefield National Monument. He had never married and left no heirs.

== Legacy ==
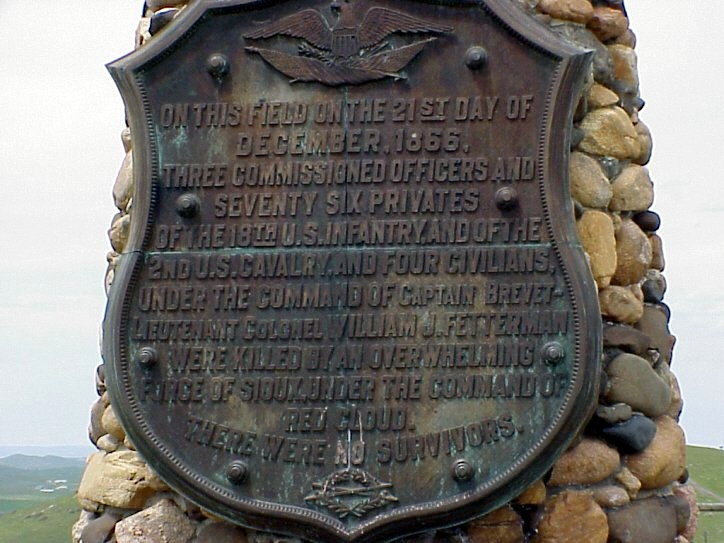
Plaque at Fetterman Battle site

In 1867, the army designated a new outpost in the Dakota Territory as "Fort Fetterman" in honor of the slain officer. There is also a Fetterman Street and Fetterman Drive in Buffalo, Wyoming, and Laramie, Wyoming. Robert Fuller portrayed Captain William Fetterman in the Oct. 26, 1966 TV movie, "Massacre At Fort Phil Kearny", an episode of Bob Hope Presents The Chrysler Theater.
