= Fort Phil Kearny =

- Fort Phil Kearny and Associated Sites
- U.S. National Register of Historic Places
- U.S. National Historic Landmark
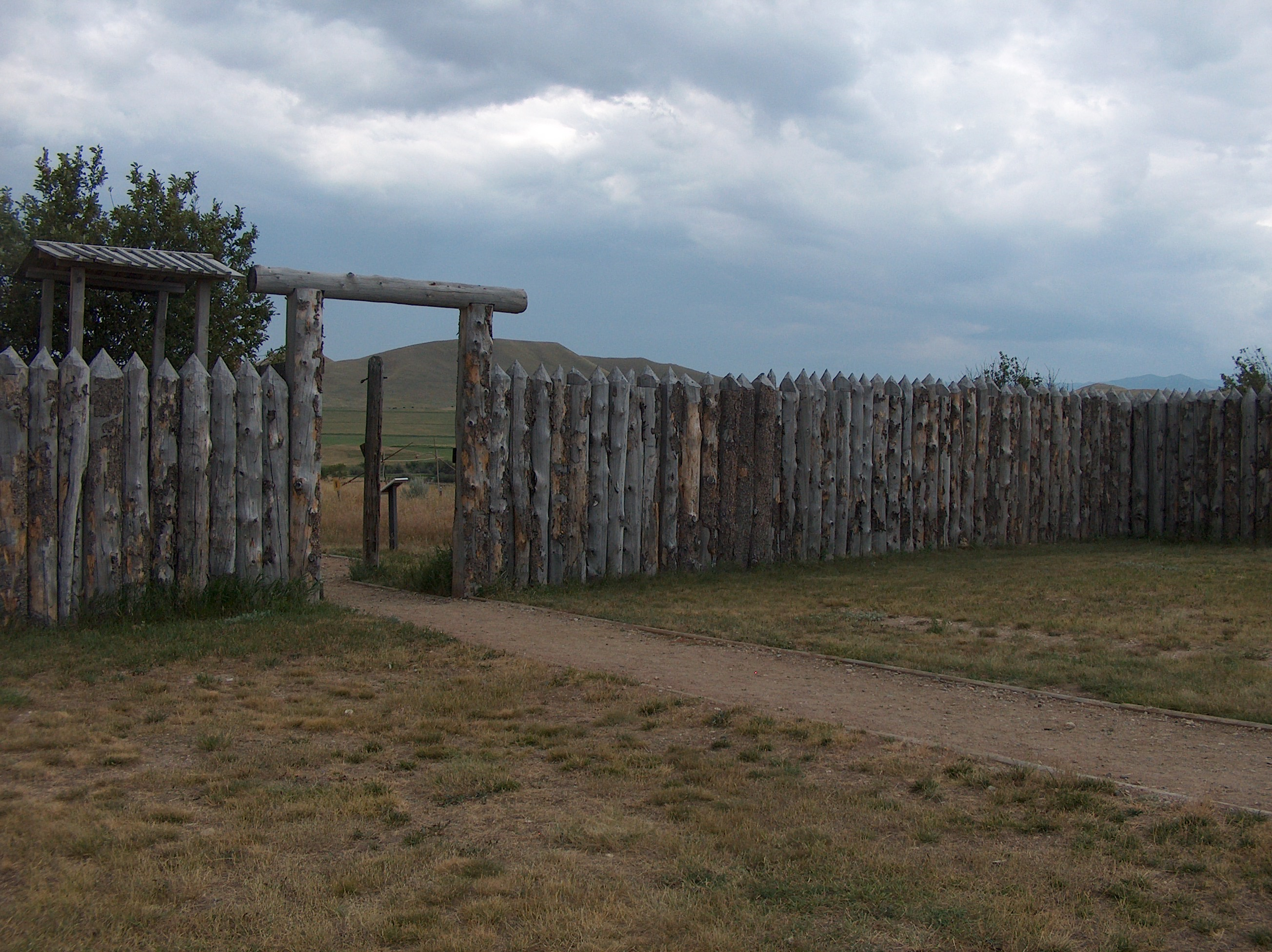
- Fort Phil Kearny, between Buffalo & Sheridan, WY

- Location within Wyoming Location within the United States
- Location: Johnson County, Wyoming, n SR W off U.S. 87
- Nearest city: Story
- Coordinates: 44°31′56″N 106°49′35″W
- Built: 1866
- NRHP reference No.: 66000756

Significant dates
- Added to NRHP: October 15, 1966
- Designated NHL: December 19, 1960

Fort Phil Kearny was an outpost of the United States Army that existed in the late 1860s in present-day northeastern Wyoming along the Bozeman Trail. Construction began in 1866 on Friday, July 13, by Companies A, C, E, and H of the 2nd Battalion, 18th Infantry, under the direction of the regimental commander and Mountain District commander Colonel Henry B. Carrington.

== History ==
The post was named for Major General Philip Kearny (1815–1862), a popular figure in the Civil War. The fort should be distinguished from the similarly named Fort Kearny in Nebraska, which was named for his uncle, Stephen Kearny (1794–1848). Today, the fort and the nearby Fetterman and Wagon Box battle sites are maintained by the State of Wyoming as the Fort Phil Kearny State Historic Site.

The fort was located along the east side of the Bighorn Mountains in present-day northern Johnson County, approximately fifteen miles (24 km) north of Buffalo. Along with Fort Reno and Fort C. F. Smith, the fort was established along the Bozeman Trail in the Powder River Country at the height of the Indian Wars to protect prospective miners traveling the trail north from the Oregon Trail to present-day Montana.

At an elevation of 4,700 feet (1,430 m) above sea level, Fort Phil Kearny was the largest of the three stockaded fortifications along the trail. Its eight-foot-high (2.4 m) log walls enclosed an area of 17 acres (6.9 ha). The longer walls on the northeast and southwest sides each measured 1,496 feet (456 m) in length; the width of the northwest side was 600 feet (180 m) and this tapered to 240 feet (73 m) at the southeast side. The perimeter of the stockade was approximately 3,900 feet (1,190 m), and its construction took more than four thousand logs. Further building construction in 1867 required over 606,000 board feet of lumber and 130,000 adobe bricks.

The fort was under continuous construction and was nearing completion in December 1866, when its garrison was due to be re-designated the 27th Infantry. At its peak strength, the garrison numbered 400 troops and 150 civilians: 9 officers, a surgeon, and 329 enlisted men of five infantry companies of the 18th/27th Infantry, including the newly recruited Company K, 27th; one officer and 60 men of Company C, 2nd Cavalry, and 150 civilian quartermaster and contractor employees.

The fort, known to the Indians as the "hated post on the Little Piney", played an important role in Red Cloud's War. The area around the fort was the site of the Fetterman Fight in 1866 and the Wagon Box Fight in 1867. By 1868, the Union Pacific Railroad had reached far enough west that emigrants could reach the Montana gold fields through present-day Idaho, rendering the dangerous Bozeman Trail obsolete. All three forts along the trail were abandoned as part of the Treaty of Fort Laramie (1868). Shortly thereafter, Fort Phil Kearny was burned by Cheyenne Indians.

Fort Phil Kearny, including the nearby sites of the Fetterman Fight and the Wagon Box Fight, was designated a National Historic Landmark in 1960.

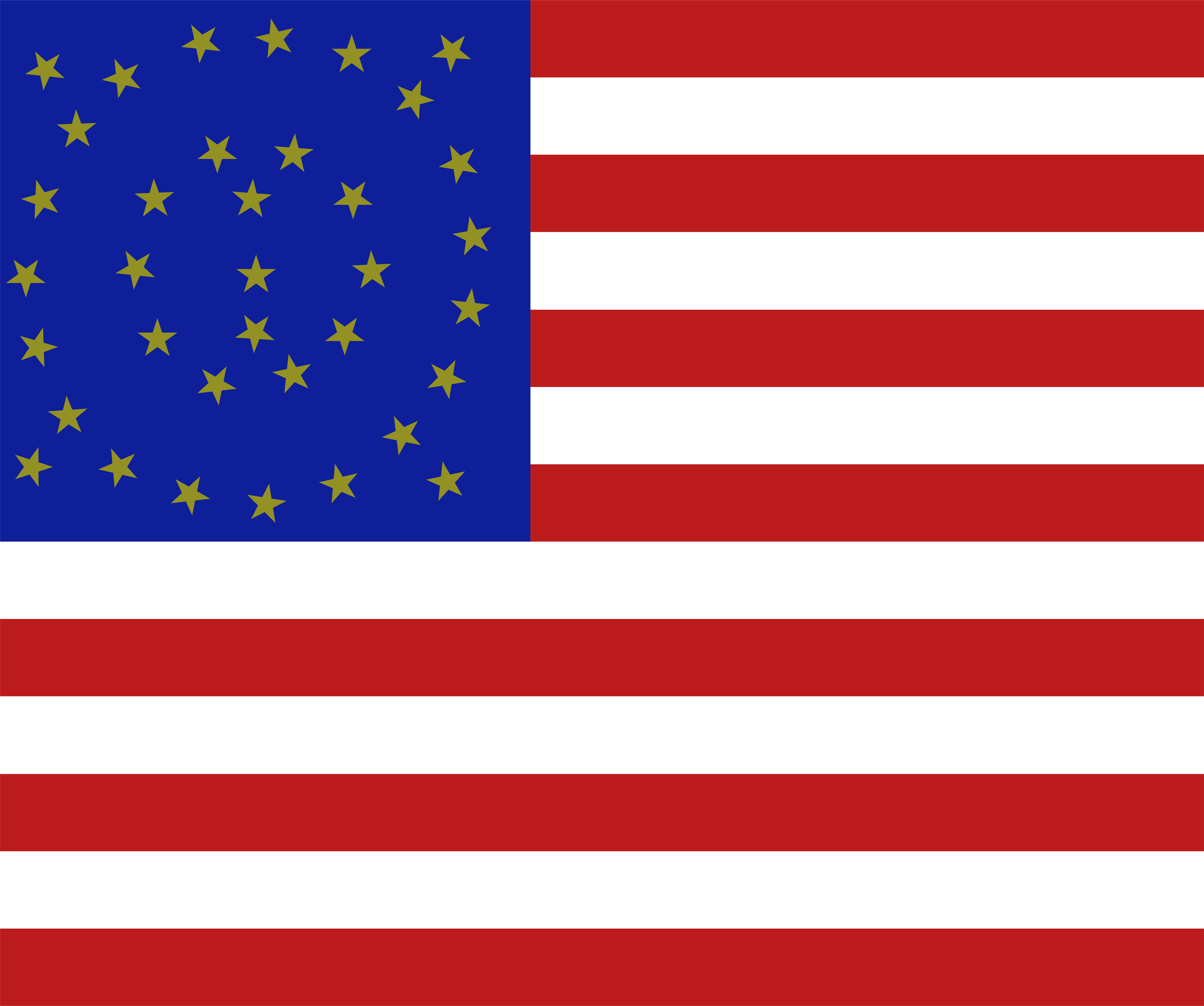
Digital remake of the 36 star flag preserved in the fort

== Fort Phil Kearny State Historic Site ==
Fort Phil Kearny State Historic Site includes a visitor center with exhibits, videos, a bookstore, and self-guided tours of the fort grounds and outlying sites. The tour marks the archaeological remains of the fort's buildings. A cabin built by the Civilian Conservation Corps (CCC) has been furnished to depict the period quarters of an officer's wife and a non-commissioned officer's quarters. Visitors can also tour the nearby battlefields which are located within a five-mile radius of the visitor center and include interpretive trails.

In 1966, NBC televised "The Massacre at Fort Phil Kearny" on the anthology series Bob Hope Presents the Chrysler Theatre.

Fort Phil Kearny was also the subject of the 1951 movie Tomahawk starring Van Heflin, by Universal International (UI) Pictures. The Internet Movie Database (IMDb) called the movie unusually accurate historically. https://www.imdb.com/title/tt0044135/

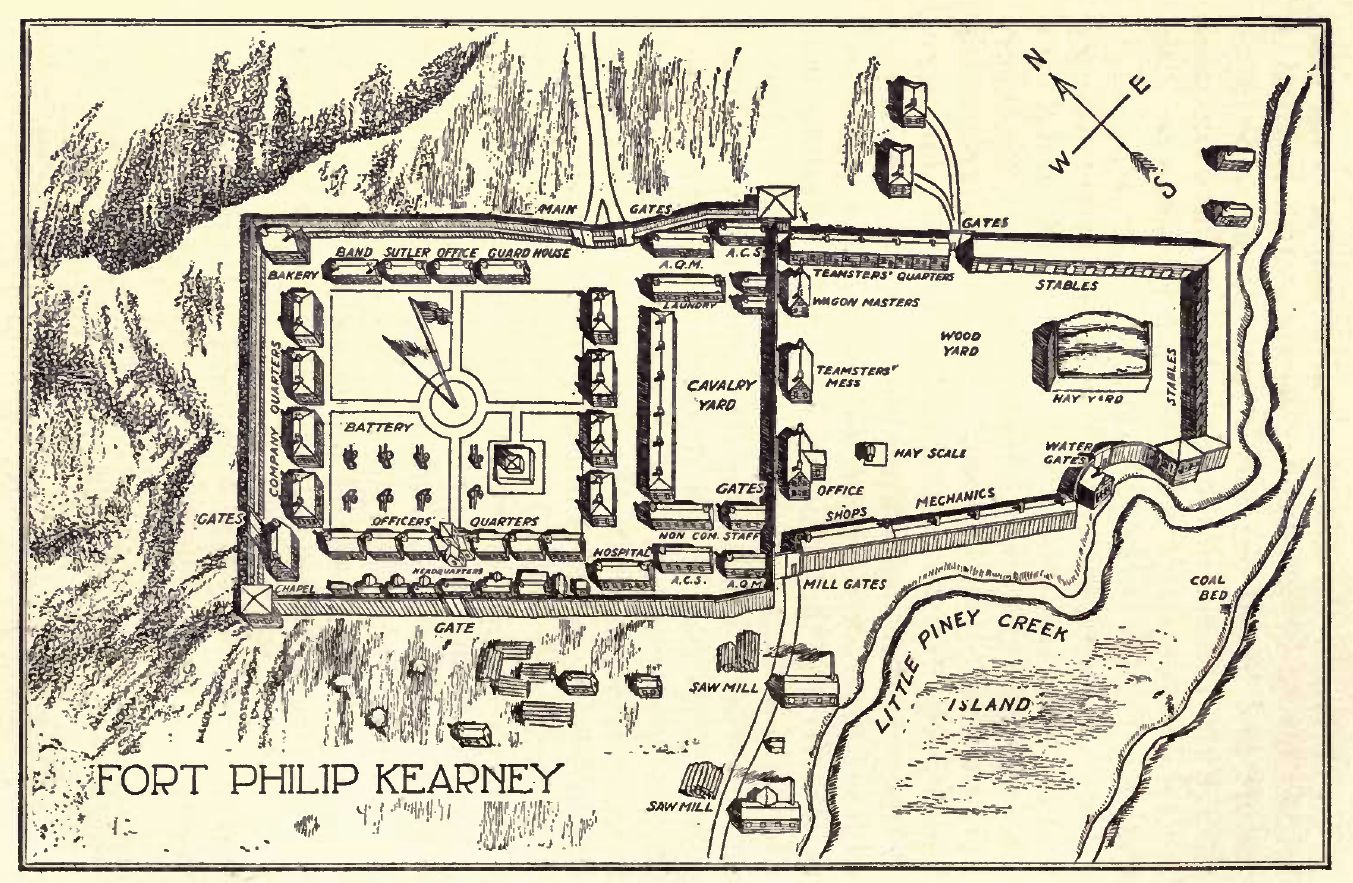
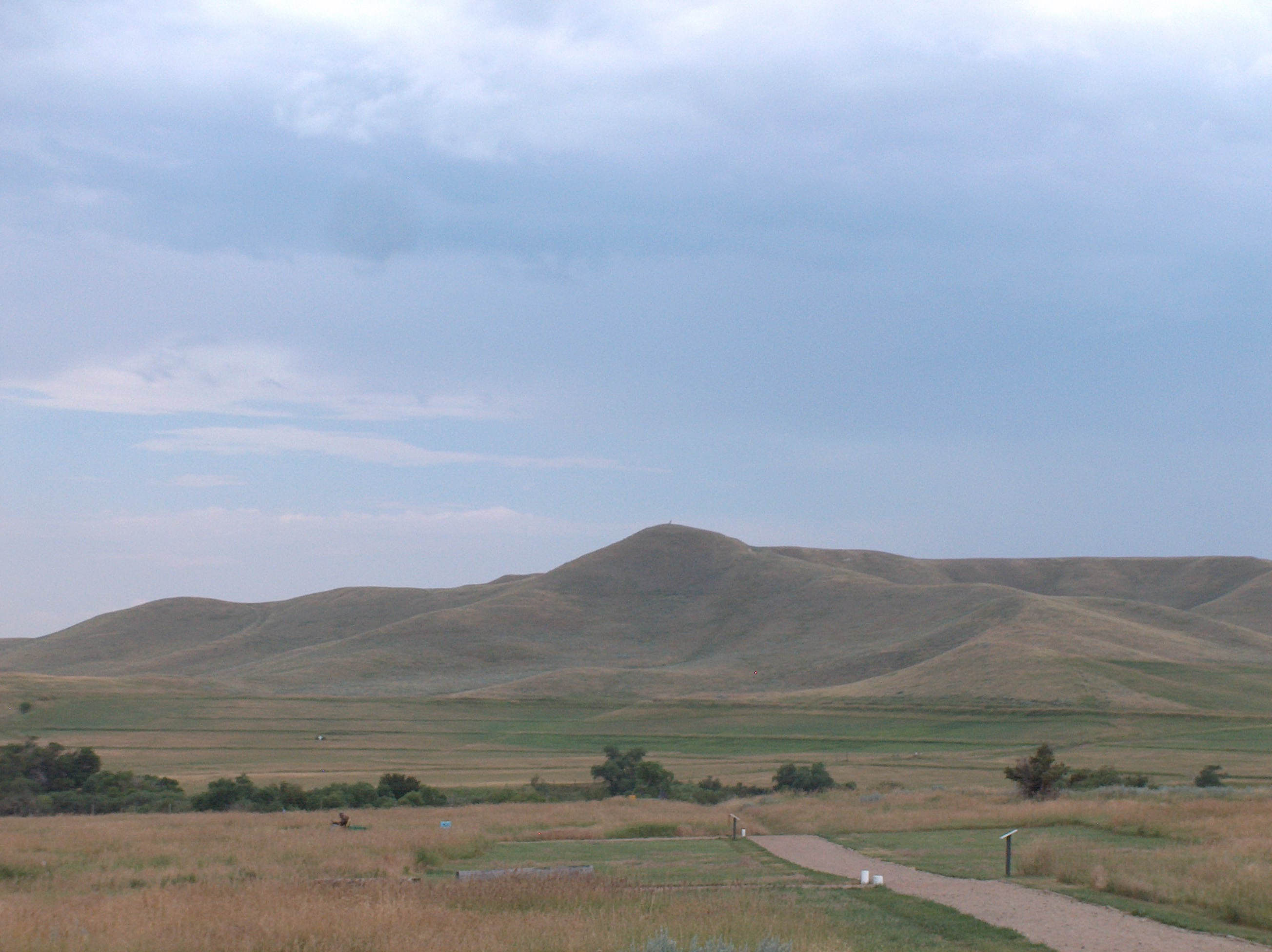
Plan of Fort Kearney from Indian Fights and Fighters (1904) (left). Pilot Hill, where a lookout was established. Communication with the fort was via signal flags. (right)

== See also ==
- Wyoming Historical Landmarks
- List of the oldest buildings in Wyoming
