= Fetterman Fight =

Battle during Red Cloud's War

- Part of Red Cloud's War and the Sioux Wars
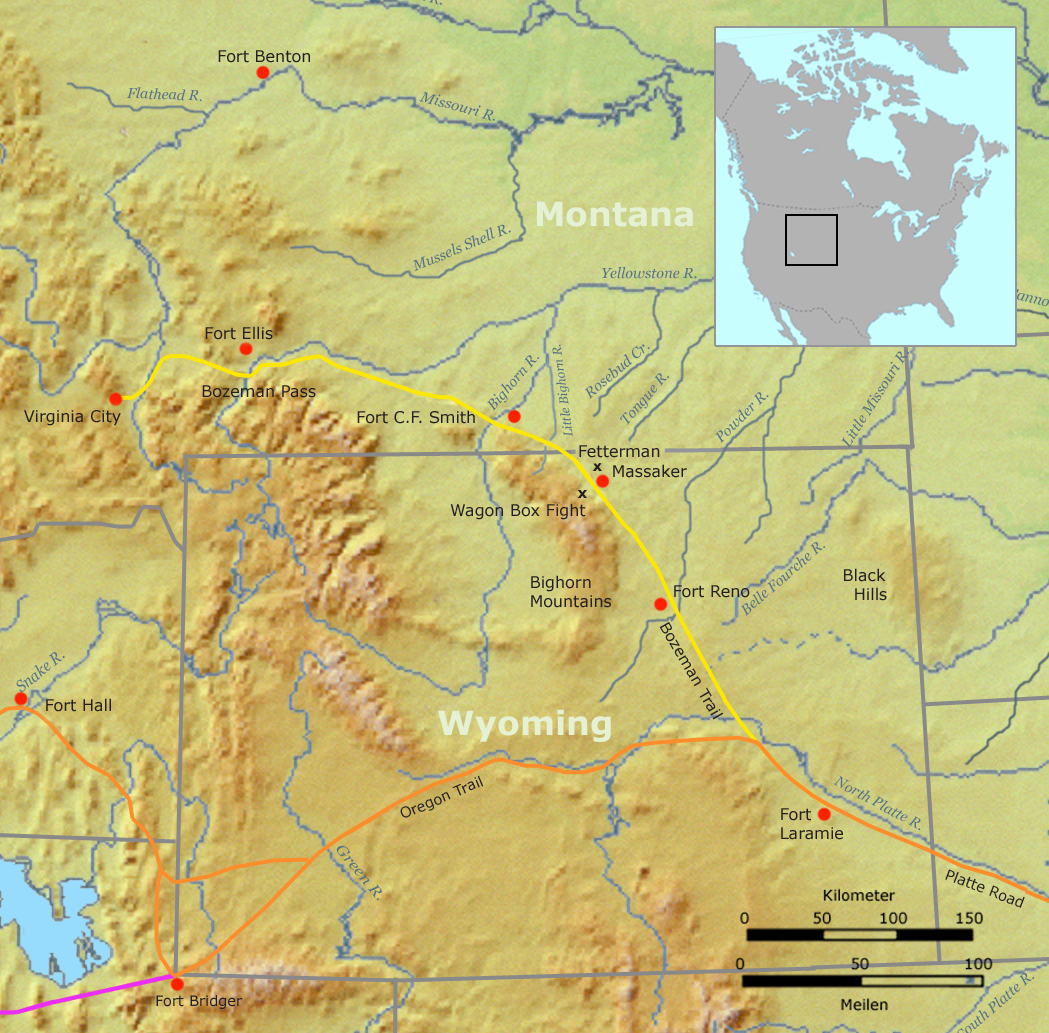
- The Bozeman trail and the location of the Fetterman Fight
Date	December 21, 1866
Location	4 miles north of Fort Phil Kearny, near Story and Banner, Wyoming 44.570782°N 106.839233°W
Result	Native American victory

Belligerents
United States	Lakota; Cheyenne; Arapaho

Commanders and leaders
(United States) William Fetterman †; (United States) Frederick Brown †; (United States) George W. Grummond †	Red Cloud; High Backbone (Hump); Crazy Horse; They Fear Even His Horses

Strength
81	1,000

Casualties and losses
81 killed	Between 13 and 160 killed

The Fetterman Fight, also known as the Fetterman Massacre or the Battle of the Hundred-in-the-Hands or the Battle of a Hundred Slain, was a battle during Red Cloud's War on December 21, 1866, between a confederation of the Lakota, Cheyenne, and Arapaho tribes and a detachment of the United States Army, based at Fort Phil Kearny, Wyoming. The U.S. military mission was intended to protect travelers on the Bozeman Trail. A group of ten warriors, including Crazy Horse, acted to lure a detachment of U.S. soldiers into an ambush. All 81 men under the command of Captain William J. Fetterman were then killed by the Native American warriors. At the time, it was the worst military disaster ever suffered by the U.S. Army on the Great Plains.

The Lakota alliance emerged victorious and the remaining U.S. forces withdrew from the area. The Fetterman Fight took place on Crow Indian land that was guaranteed to them by a treaty signed with the U.S. government. The Lakota and their allies were operating without the consent of the Crow.

== Background ==
The Fort Laramie Treaty of 1851 designated this territory as Crow land. The Lakota, the Cheyenne, and the Arapaho accepted it as such. Following the dwindling herds of buffalo, the three tribes soon began ignoring the treaty boundaries and hunting on Crow land. By 1860 these traditional enemies of the Crow had taken control of their hunting grounds west of Powder River.

In June 1866, Colonel Henry B. Carrington advanced from Fort Laramie into the Powder River country, now the hunting grounds of the Lakota, Northern Cheyenne, and Northern Arapaho. His orders were to protect European-American emigrants traveling west along the Bozeman Trail. Carrington had 700 soldiers and 300 civilians in his command. He established three forts along the trail, including his headquarters at Fort Phil Kearny, near present-day Buffalo, Wyoming. All three forts were located in what was treaty-designated Crow territory. The army used a treaty right to "establish roads, military and other posts". About 400 of his soldiers and most of the civilians were stationed at Fort Phil Kearny.

== First armed conflicts ==
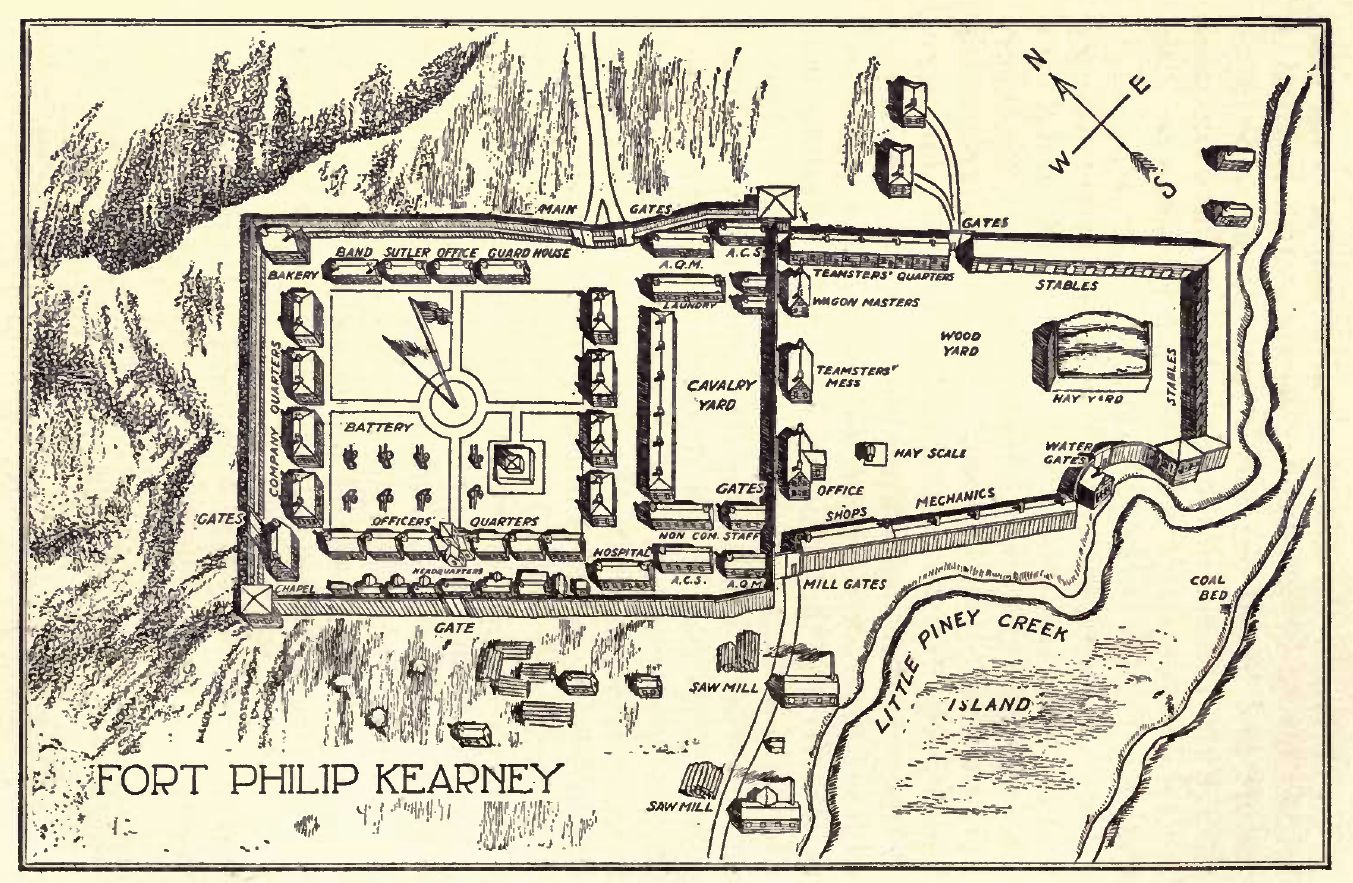
Plan of Fort Phil Kearny from Indian Fights and Fighters (1904)

During the next few months, while Fort Phil Kearny was under construction, Carrington suffered about 50 Indian attacks, losing more than 20 soldiers and civilians. The Indian warriors, invariably mounted, generally appeared in groups of 20 to 100. Several of Carrington's junior officers pressed him to take the offensive. They increased their urging after November 3, when a cavalry company of 63 men arrived to reinforce the post. The cavalry company was led by Lieutenant Horatio S. Bingham. He was accompanied by infantry captains William J. Fetterman and James W. Powell. Both captains had been assigned to Fort Phil Kearny from the 18th Infantry's headquarters at Fort Laramie. Bingham and Fetterman were Civil War veterans, and Fetterman had a distinguished war record.

Although he had no experience fighting Indians, Fetterman criticized Carrington's defensive posture and was contemptuous of their Indian foes. He allegedly boasted, "Give me 80 men and I can ride through the whole Sioux nation." Many other officers shared Fetterman's feelings. Shortly after Fetterman arrived at Fort Phil Kearny, Carrington gave him permission to attempt a night ambush. However, the Indians avoided his position and stampeded a herd of cattle on the bank of the Powder River opposite Fetterman's intended trap. On November 22, Fetterman himself almost fell into an Indian ambush. He had accompanied an escort guarding a wagon train gathering firewood and construction timber for Fort Phil Kearny. A single Indian appeared, trying to entice the soldiers into chasing him into the woods. Lieutenant Bisbee, commanding the wagon train, took cover instead of pursuing.

== Carrington takes the offensive ==
On November 25, 1866, Carrington's superior, General Philip St. George Cooke, ordered him to take the offensive in response to the Indians' "murderous and insulting attacks". Carrington's first opportunity to strike back came on December 6. His pickets on Pilot Hill signaled that an Army wood train was being attacked four miles west of the fort. Carrington told Fetterman to proceed west with a company of cavalry and a squad of mounted infantry to relieve the wood train. Carrington himself led another mounted detachment to circle north in an attempt to cut off the Indians' retreat. During the movement, Lieutenants Grummond and Bingham, with several others, became separated from Carrington, who was surrounded by about a hundred Indian warriors. Fetterman soon arrived to reinforce Carrington, and the Indians retreated.

Grummond eventually followed with seven Indians in hot pursuit, though he managed to reach safety with Carrington and Fetterman. The mutilated bodies of Bingham and a sergeant were found several hours later. Four soldiers had been wounded after they pursued another Indian decoy into an ambush. Carrington reported that he had killed ten Indians, but both Fetterman and he were sobered by the shortcomings in organization and discipline of their largely inexperienced soldiers. Fetterman said, "This Indian war has become a hand-to-hand fight requiring the utmost caution." Carrington's guide, famous mountain man Jim Bridger, was more succinct: "These soldiers don't know anything about fighting Indians".

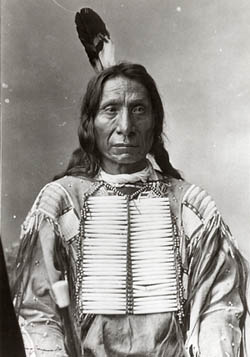
Red Cloud, the Oglala Lakota leader

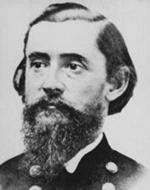
Colonel Henry B. Carrington

His caution confirmed by this experience, Carrington intensified training for his soldiers and officers, forming them into six companies. He doubled the number of guards for the wood trains and kept the 50 serviceable horses the fort still possessed – having lost many in Indian raids – saddled and ready to sally from dawn to dark. On December 19, the Indians attacked another wood train. Carrington sent Captain Powell, his most cautious officer, out of the fort to relieve the wood train with a cavalry company and mounted infantry. He gave explicit orders not to pursue the Indians beyond Lodge Trail Ridge, two miles north of Fort Phil Kearny. Powell returned safely, having followed orders and accomplished his mission. Carrington reemphasized to his soldiers his policy of caution until reinforcements and additional horses and supplies arrived from Fort Laramie. On December 20, Carrington turned down Fetterman and Captain Brown's proposal that they lead 50 civilian employees in a raid on the Lakota village on the Tongue River, about 50 miles distant.

== Trap ==
Red Cloud and other Indian leaders, encouraged by their successes, decided to undertake a large military operation against Fort Phil Kearny before winter snows forced them to break up their large village on the Tongue River and disperse. The decoy trick had worked on December 6 and they decided to try it again, this time with a force adequate to destroy any group of soldiers sent to chase them. The warriors, possibly numbering more than 1,000, congregated about 10 miles north of Fort Phil Kearny, reconnoitered, and decided the best place to lay the trap was along the Bozeman Trail north of Lodge Trail Ridge. It was out of sight, but only about 4 miles from Fort Phil Kearny. The Cheyenne and Arapaho took up positions on the west side of the trail and the Lakota on the east. The group of Indians chosen to decoy the soldiers included the young Oglala Crazy Horse.

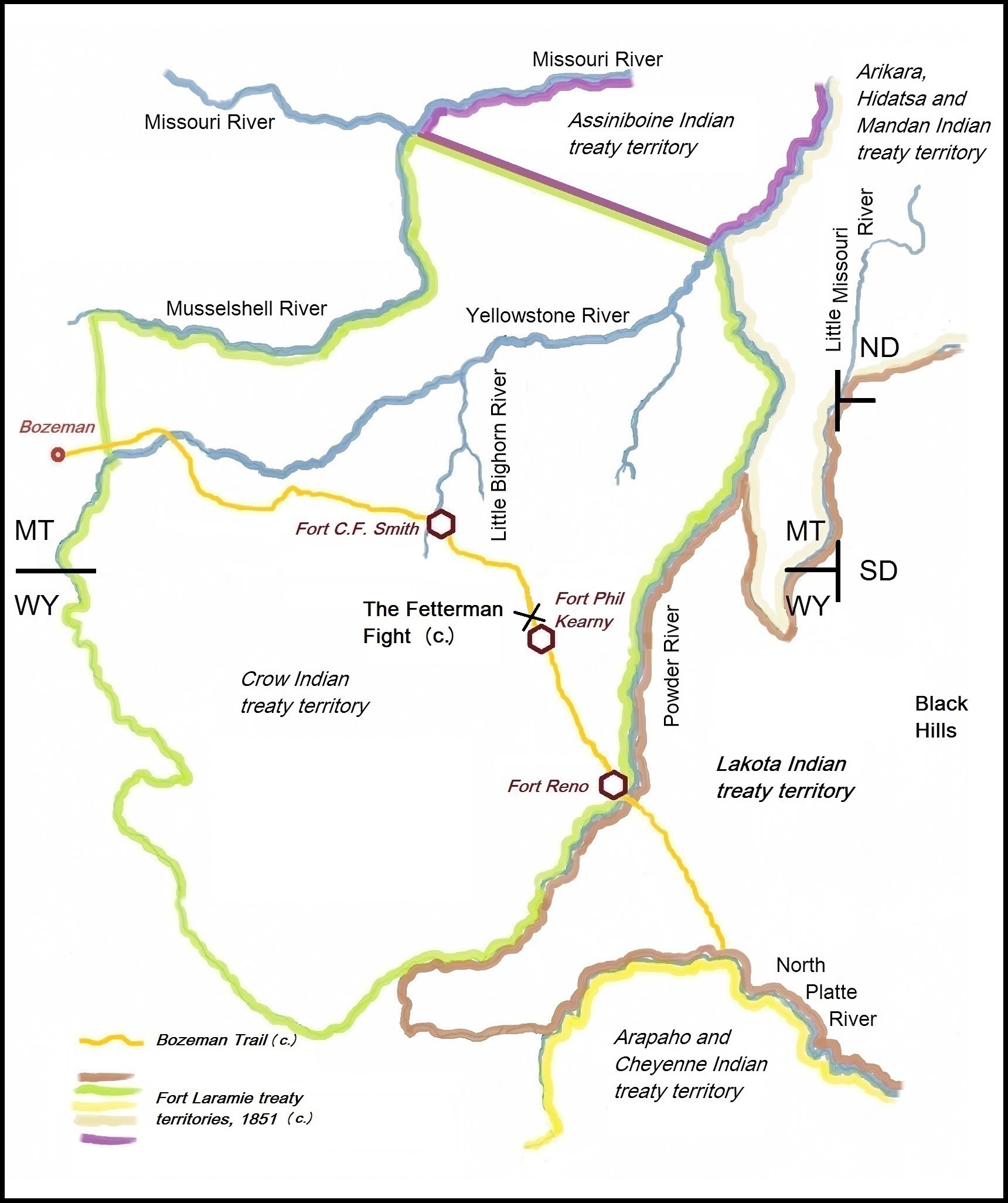
The Fetterman Fight, in Crow territory west of Powder River, guaranteed by 1851 treaty. The Lakota and their Indian allies won the Fetterman Fight in the territory, which they had "recently wrested from the Crows" in battles between the peoples. Wolf Bow (a Crow) protested to white officials against the Lakota invasion, saying: "Put the Sioux Indians in their own country, and keep them from troubling us. Don't stop fighting them."

The morning of December 21, 1866, was clear and cold. About 10 am, Carrington dispatched a wagon train to the "pinery" – about 5 miles northwest and the nearest source of construction timber and firewood for Fort Phil Kearny. Almost 90 soldiers were detailed to guard the wagon train. Less than an hour later, Carrington's pickets on Pilot Hill signaled by flag that the wagon train was under attack. Carrington ordered a relief party composed of 49 infantrymen of the 18th Infantry and 27 mounted troopers of the 2nd Cavalry under the command of Captain James Powell. By claiming seniority as a brevet lieutenant colonel, Fetterman asked for and was given command of the relief party. Powell remained behind. Another officer of the 18th, Lieutenant George W. Grummond, a known critic of Carrington, led the cavalry, which had been leaderless since Bingham's death in early December. Captain Frederick Brown, until recently the post quartermaster and another of Carrington's critics, and two civilians, James Wheatley and Isaac Fisher, joined Fetterman, bringing the relief force up to 81 officers and men. The infantry marched out first; the cavalry had to retrieve its mounts before it could follow and catch up.

According to Carrington, his orders were clear. "Under no circumstances" was the relief party to "pursue over the ridge, that is Lodge Trail Ridge". Lieutenant Grummond's wife, in her memoirs, confirmed Carrington's statement. She said these orders were given twice, the second time by Carrington from the sentry walk after ordering the soldiers to halt as they left the front gate of the fort. Francis Grummond wrote that everyone present could hear the orders. On leaving the fort, however, Fetterman took the Lodge Ridge Trail northward rather than the trail northwest toward the pinery where the wagon train was. Carrington assumed that Fetterman intended to approach the Indians attacking the wood train from their rear. Within a short time, the signal came that the wood train was no longer under attack. About 50 Indians appeared near Fort Phil Kearny, but Carrington dispersed them with a few cannon shots. Those Indians and others harassed Fetterman as he climbed Lodge Trail Ridge and disappeared out of sight of the fort.

About noon in the fort, Carrington and his men heard heavy firing to their north. Carrington gathered together about 75 men under Captain Ten Eyck and sent them out on foot to search for Fetterman. Ten Eyck advanced carefully up Lodge Trail Ridge. Reaching the top, about 12:45 pm, he and his men saw a very large force of Indians in the Peno Creek valley below. Indian warriors approached the soldiers and taunted them. Meanwhile, Carrington dispatched another group of 42 soldiers to join Ten Eyck. The Indians in the valley slowly dispersed and disappeared. Ten Eyck advanced carefully and the soldiers found the bodies of Fetterman and all of his men in the valley. The dead soldiers had been stripped naked and mutilated. That afternoon, wagons were sent to bring the bodies back to Fort Kearny.

== Red Cloud's perspective ==
According to Charles Eastman, in 1866 the Indian's discomfort with the white man had peaked. Red Cloud was determined to face any odds rather than bow down. “Hear ye, Dakotas!” he exclaimed. “When the Great Father at Washington sent us his chief soldier [General Harney] to ask for a path through our hunting grounds, a way for his iron road to the mountains and the western sea, we were told that they wished merely to pass through our country, not to tarry among us, but to seek for gold in the far west. Our old chiefs thought to show their friendship and good will, when they allowed this dangerous snake in our midst. They promised to protect the wayfarers. Yet before the ashes of the council fire are cold, the Great Father is building his forts among us. You have heard the sound of the white soldier’s ax upon the Little Piney. His presence here is an insult and a threat. It is an insult to the spirits of our ancestors. Are we then to give up their sacred graves to be plowed for corn? Dakotas, I am for war!” Less than seven days after that speech, the Sioux went to Fort Phil Kearny, the new sentinel of the Bozeman Trail. A grand attack had been planned with care and nearly every well-known Sioux chief had agreed to strike the invaders. Crazy Horse was put in charge of the attack, while the older men acted as councilors. They experienced great success; in less than half an hour, they had defeated nearly 100 men under Captain Fetterman, who had been cleverly drawn out of the fort by a ruse.

== Lakota prophecy and name of the battle ==
Just before the battle, Red Cloud called for the Lakotas' most powerful Winkte, a two spirit who was believed to have special powers, to give advice from the butte overlooking the proposed ambush site. The Winkte rode on his pony in a crazed manner four times between the warriors gathered on the butte and Lodge Trail Ridge, each time gathering more "soldiers" into his hands in a prophetic manner. When he returned to Red Cloud the fourth time, he declared that in his vision he had 100 blue-coat soldiers in each hand — too many to hold. The Lakota saw this as the good medicine that won the battle and thereafter called it the "Battle of the Hundred-in-the-Hands". A total of 81 American soldiers and civilians died in the battle.

== Battle ==
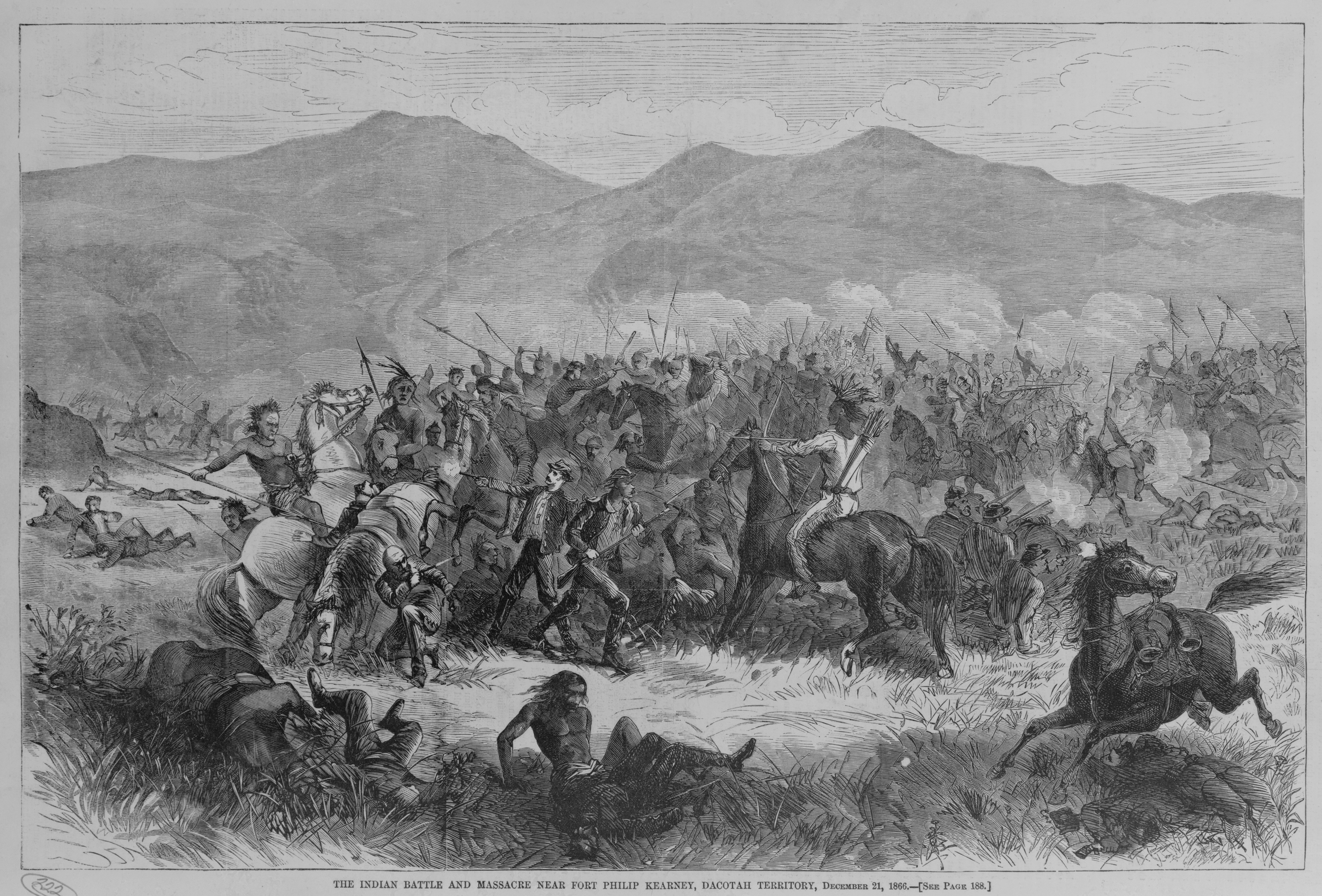
An 1867 drawing of the Fetterman Fight

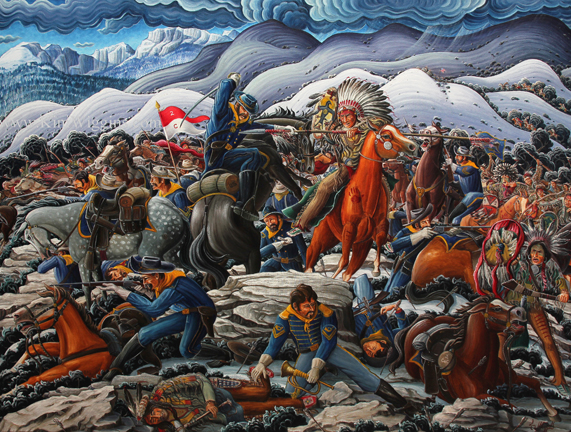
Kim Douglas Wiggins' study of the Fetterman Fight, early 21st century

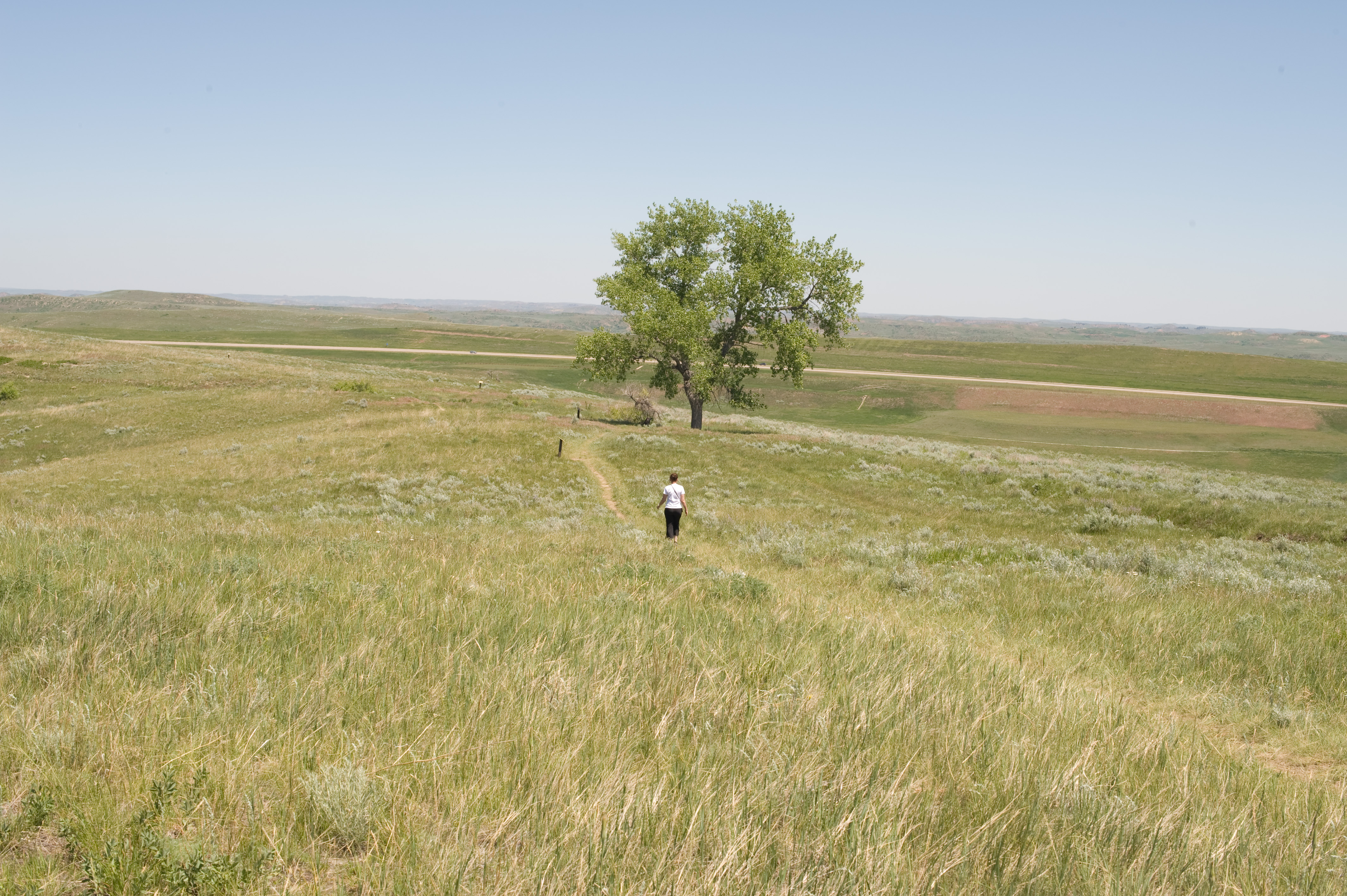
Massacre Hill: Fetterman and his men were killed here. The Arapaho and Cheyenne were concealed to the left (west) of the foot trail in this photo; the Lakota were to the right (east).

The battlefield was examined briefly and the bodies of soldiers removed quickly. According to a Cheyenne named White Elk, who was interviewed as he walked the battlefield 48 years after the event, the Indians had chosen ten warriors as decoys to tempt Fetterman into the ambush: two Arapaho, two Cheyenne, and two from each of the three Lakota bands present: the Oglala, Brulé, and Miniconjou. About three times as many Lakota participated in the battle as did Cheyenne and Arapaho. White Elk said that more Indians were present than at the Battle of the Little Bighorn, which would indicate an Indian force of considerably more than 1,000 men. Eyewitness testimonies and historians stated that Red Cloud was present in the battle, although his role during the fighting is unknown. Indians rarely had a single leader or a command structure in combat. Red Cloud was one of those who planned much of the attack, but Hump (High Backbone), a Miniconjou, was the prominent leader in the fighting.

After leaving Fort Phil Kearny with his infantry, Fetterman fired volleys at the small group of Indians, who harassed his flanks and taunted his soldiers. Instead of turning west to where the wagon train was under attack, he advanced northward up Lodge Trail Ridge, perhaps planning to circle east toward the wagon train, perhaps drawn by the Indian decoys, who mooned him. At the top of the ridge, in violation of orders from Carrington, he chose to follow the Indian decoys north rather than turn west to rescue the wagon train. He advanced along a narrow ridge leading to a flat area along Peno Creek. His cavalry under Grummond took the van, initially moving at a walk so the infantry could keep up. The decoys led him onward, with the cavalry leaving the infantry behind.

About half a mile after Fetterman had crossed the summit of Lodge Trail Ridge, the decoys gave a signal and the Indians on either side of the trail charged. Fetterman's infantry took up a position among some large rocks and, in hand-to-hand fighting, he and 49 of his men died. Their bodies were found in a small circle, huddled together for defense. A few of the cavalry were with Fetterman, but Grummond and most of the cavalry were apparently a mile ahead of the infantry, near the flat along Peno Creek and possibly chasing other decoys. When attacked, the cavalry retreated uphill and southward, toward Fetterman and Fort Kearny. Civilians Wheatley and Fisher and several cavalrymen, "knowing it was fatal to retreat from Indians", halted and took shelter among several large rocks, where they were killed. Grummond and the cavalry apparently remained in good order, leading their horses and presumably firing at the Indians all around them. Because of the steepness of the hill covered with ice and snow, the Indians, mostly on foot, were hampered in their attempts to come in close quarters with the cavalry, but soon succeeded. Grummond probably was killed at this point, after he had personally decapitated at least one warrior with his saber before being overwhelmed by the others. The cavalry continued its retreat, halting to fight in a flat area on the ridge 400 yards north of where the infantry lay dead. The Indians sniped at the soldiers while organizing a charge, and then rushed in among the soldiers, killing them all. The Indians took about twenty minutes to kill the infantry and another twenty minutes to dispatch the cavalry.

The Indians had few guns and fought mostly with bows and arrows, spears, and war clubs. Only six of the 81 soldiers died of gunshot wounds. Captains Fetterman and Brown are reputed to have committed suicide by shooting each other in the head to avoid capture, but the official army autopsy report gives a throat wound as the cause of Fetterman's death. Indian accounts credit a Lakota warrior named American Horse with killing Fetterman by slashing his throat. Fetterman may have shot himself just before American Horse cut his throat.

The Indians stripped and mutilated the soldiers' bodies before leaving, possibly mirroring the Sand Creek Massacre of two years before. In his report to his superiors, Carrington listed what was discovered at the battlefield the next day: eyes torn out and laid on rocks, noses and ears cut off, teeth chopped out, brains taken out and placed on rocks, hands and feet cut off, and private parts severed. The two civilians, Wheatley and Fisher, had their faces smashed into bloody pulp, and Wheatley had been pierced by more than a hundred arrows. The last trooper to die in the battle may have been Adolph Metzger, a bugler who used his instrument as a weapon until it was battered shapeless. Metzger was the only soldier whose dead body was not mutilated. The Indians covered him with a buffalo hide. Some historians interpreted this as a tribute to his bravery in standing alone against several armed enemies.

Estimates of Indian casualties vary widely. Historian Stephen Ambrose said Indian dead totaled ten Lakota, two Cheyenne, and one Arapaho, some of them killed by 'friendly' arrow fire rather than soldier's bullets. George Bent, a Cheyenne-Anglo man, said fourteen Indian warriors were killed. White Elk said only two Cheyenne were killed, but he saw 50 or 60 Lakota dead – more, he said, than were killed in the Battle of the Little Big Horn ten years later. Years later, Red Cloud remembered the names of eleven Oglala who had been killed in the battle. Some estimates range up to 160 Indian dead and an equal number wounded. A more recent account lists the names of 21 Indians reported as killed by Native sources, and also says more likely died from their wounds after the fight.

== Aftermath ==
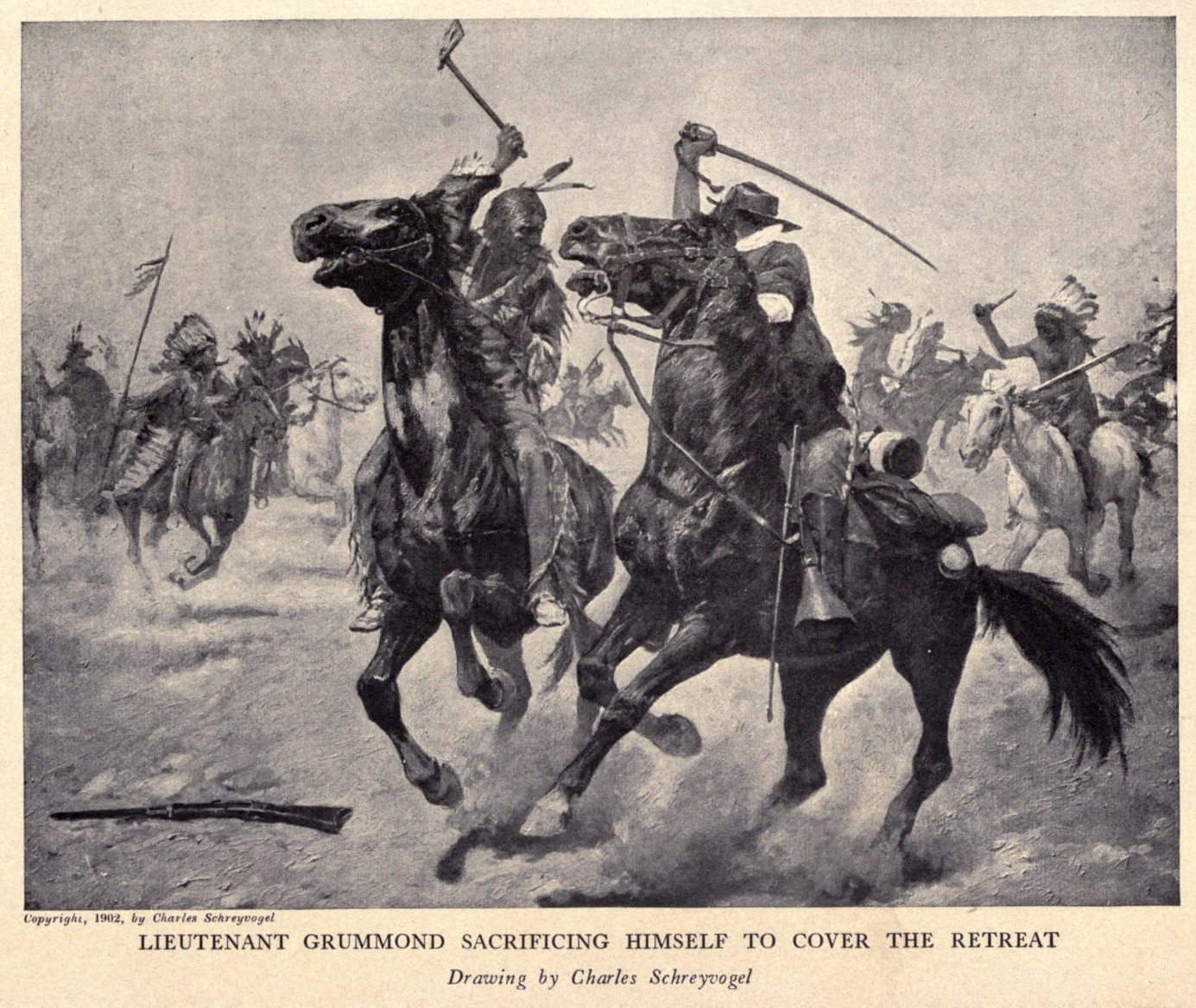
Drawing by Charles Schreyvogel, depicting "Lieutenant Grummond sacrificing himself to cover the retreat"

Counting Fetterman and his men, in less than six months at Fort Phil Kearny, Carrington had lost 96 soldiers and 58 civilians. More than 300 soldiers were still garrisoned at the fort.

Following the Fetterman Fight, that evening Carrington prepared for an attack on the fort, ordering all his men to stand watch, three to a porthole. All extra ammunition and explosives were deposited in a powder magazine ringed with wagons. If the Indians attacked, the ten women and children at the fort were ordered to go into the magazine. Soldiers were told that, in the last extremity, they were to retreat to the magazine. Carrington would then blow up the magazine to ensure that no Americans remained alive to be captured by the Indians.

That evening, a civilian, John "Portugee" Phillips, volunteered to carry a distress message to Fort Laramie. Carrington's message to General Cooke told of the Fetterman disaster and requested immediate reinforcements and repeating Spencer carbines. Carrington sent Phillips and another messenger, Philip Bailey, out that evening on the best remaining horses. Phillips accomplished the 236-mile ride to Fort Laramie in four days. A blizzard began on December 22, and Phillips rode through a foot of snow and below-zero temperatures. He saw no Indians during his ride. He arrived at Fort Laramie late in the evening on December 25 during a full-dress Christmas ball and staggered, exhausted, into the party to deliver his message.

Carrington and a detail of 80 men marched cautiously out of Fort Phil Kearny on December 22 as the blizzard was approaching and gathered the remaining bodies of those killed. On December 26, the soldiers buried the bodies of Fetterman, his officers and men in a common trench. By January 1, Carrington's fears of an Indian attack on the fort had subsided. The snows were deep and Jim Bridger advised him that the Indians would hole up for the winter.

General Cooke, on receipt of Carrington's distress message, immediately ordered that he be relieved of command by Brigadier General Henry W. Wessells, who arrived safely at Fort Kearny on January 16 with two companies of cavalry and four of infantry. One man in his command froze to death during the journey. Carrington left Fort Kearny on January 23 with his wife and the other women and children, including the pregnant wife of the deceased Lieutenant Grummond. They braved temperatures as low as -38 °F (-39 °C) during the journey to Fort Laramie. Half of the sixty soldiers escorting them suffered frostbite.

Lurid newspaper stories blamed Carrington for the Fetterman disaster. An investigation absolved him of blame, but the report was not made public. The investigation noted that twelve companies of soldiers were stationed at Fort Laramie in a region at peace, while at Fort Phil Kearny Carrington had only five companies in a region at war. Carrington spent the rest of his life attempting to repair his tarnished reputation as a soldier.

The Fetterman Fight soured the mood of the nation and eroded the government's will to defend the Bozeman Trail. In 1868, Fort Phil Kearny was abandoned and, in November of that year, Red Cloud signed a peace agreement with the US. "For the first time in its history, the United States government had negotiated a peace which conceded everything demanded by the enemy and which extracted nothing in return." Indian sovereignty over the Powder River country, however, endured for only eight years.

== Controversy ==
Although he was initially blamed for the Fetterman defeat, Carrington and his author wife, after many years of effort, succeeded in deflecting blame back to Fetterman. Carrington's case was that Fetterman was arrogant, insubordinate, and inexperienced in fighting Indians and that he had given Fetterman explicit orders not to venture beyond the summit of Lodge Trail Ridge. According to Margret Irvin Carrington in her book Absaraka: Home of the Crows,

The orders were given in front of Lieutenant Grummond's house, next the colonel's, and those who were present heard them repeated with distinctness and special urgency. Lieutenant Wands was also instructed to repeat them. As if peculiarly impressed with some anticipations of rashness in the movement, the colonel, just after the command left, went across the parade ground to a sentry platform, halted the mounted party, and gave additional orders, understood in the garrison, and by those who heard them, to be the substantial repition [sic] of the former. 'The health of Mrs Grummond was such that Lieutenant Wands and other friends urged him, for his family's sake, to be prudent, and avoid all rash movements and any pursuit that would draw them over Lodge Trail Ridge, and to report to Brevet Lieutenant-Colonel Fetterman the orders he had received. These orders, in so many words, 'to relieve the train, and under no circumstances to cross the ridge.' Everyone knew why special emphasis was given to these orders.

The bodies of Fetterman and his soldiers were found more than half a mile beyond the summit of the ridge. According to Calitri, historians believe evidence conflicts as to whether Carrington gave his order. He suggests that Carrington and Fetterman planned to take the offensive against the Indians attacking the wood train and that Fetterman took the Lodge Trail Ridge to gain a position to attack the Indians from the rear. He says that other than Carrington's accusations, "there is no evidence indicating that Fetterman was anything but a professional officer and a perfect gentleman" with a distinguished combat record.

Calitri also suggests controversy about Grummond. On dispatching Grummond and the cavalry to join Fetterman, Carrington explicitly ordered him to stay with Fetterman during the operation. Yet, at some point, Grummond led his cavalry far in advance of Fetterman, chasing the Indian decoys in direct violation of his orders. He had a distinguished Civil War record as a combat officer, but he had been court-martialed for drunkenness and abuse of civilians and was known as a bigamist. Calitri suggests that he was reckless and possibly disobeyed orders during the December 6 fight.

Also, in the case of Captain Tenodor Ten Eyck, who was sent by Carrington to support or rescue Fetterman when the sounds of battle were heard at Fort Phil Kearny, the captain was accused of having been slow to march to the aid of Fetterman, taking a longer route to reach him. Ten Eyck was accused of cowardice and drunkenness and was permitted to retire from the army. Even if he had taken the shortest route, Ten Eyck was highly unlikely to have arrived in time to assist Fetterman.

== Order of battle ==
Native Americans, about 1,000 warriors

Native Americans	Tribe	Leaders
Native Americans	Lakota Sioux	Miniconjou: High Backbone (Hump); Oglala: Crazy Horse American Horse
Native Americans	Northern Cheyenne	Wooden Leg; White Elk
Native Americans	Arapaho	

United States Army

Wood-cutting detachment rescue party from Fort Phil Kearny, Dakota Territory, December 21, 1866, Brevet Lieutenant Colonel and Captain William J. Fetterman †, commanding.

Expedition	Regiment	Companies and others
Captain William J. Fetterman †, commanding 81 men.	2nd U.S. Cavalry Regiment: Second Lieutenant George W. Grummond †	Company C: Second Lieutenant George W. Grummond (detached from 18th Infantry) †, Sergeant James Baker †
Captain William J. Fetterman †, commanding 81 men.	Second Battalion, 18th U.S. Infantry Regiment: Captain William J. Fetterman †; Captain Frederick H. Brown †	Company A: Captain William J. Fetterman †, First Sergeant Augustus Lange †; Company C: Sergeant Francis Raymond †, Sergeant Patrick Rooney †; Company E: Sergeant William Morgan †; Company H: Sergeant Alex Smith †; One unassigned recruit, Private Thomas Madden, 18th Infantry †
Civilians	Isaac Fisher †; James Wheatley †	

== See also ==
- Charles Eastman
- Geronimo
- Chief Joseph
- List of battles won by Indigenous peoples of the Americas
- Sitting Bull
