= Red Cloud =

Leader of the Oglala Lakota (1822–1909)

- Maȟpíya Lúta
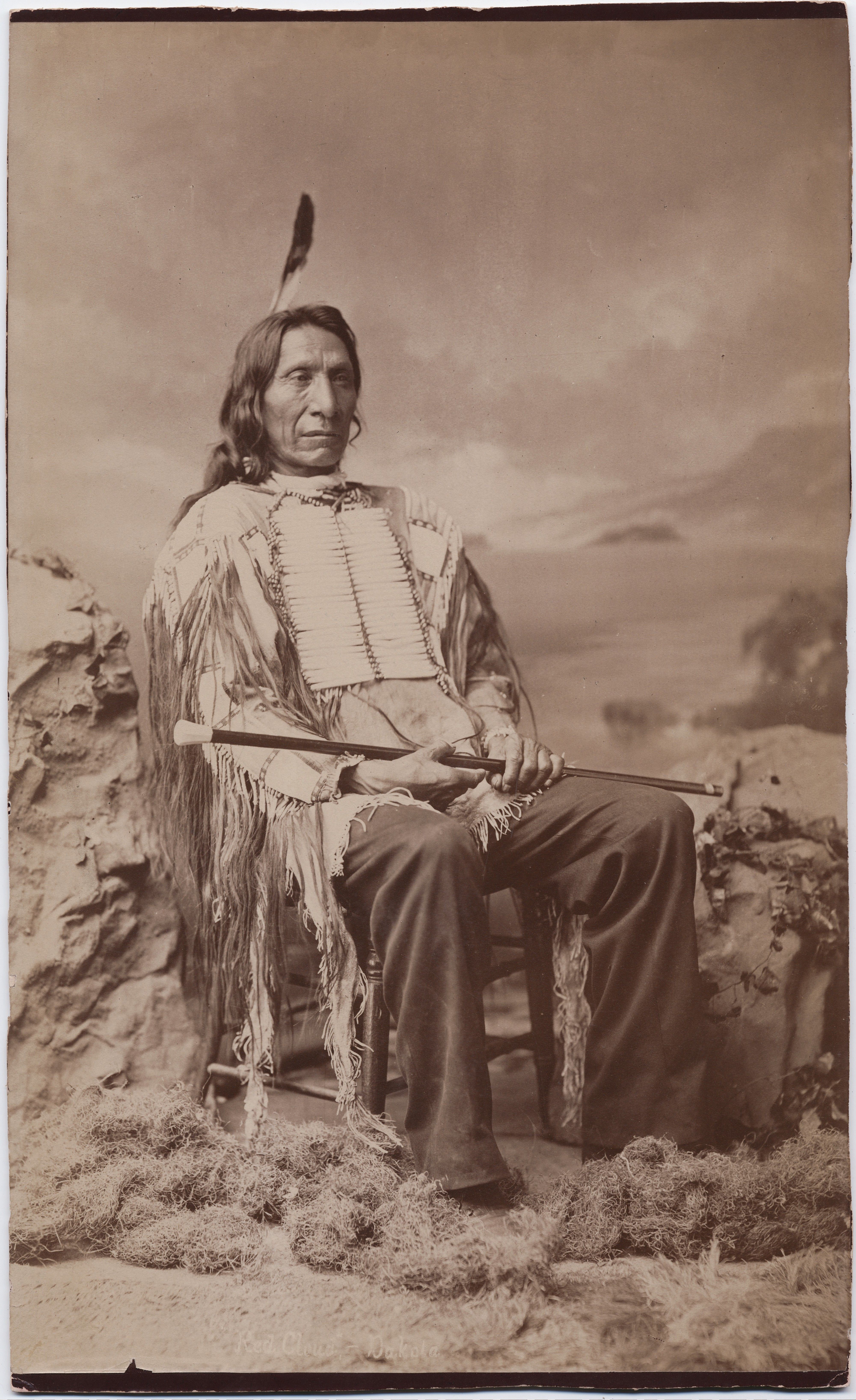
- Red Cloud in 1880
- Born: c. 1822 near modern-day North Platte, Nebraska
- Died: December 10, 1909 (aged 86–87); Pine Ridge, South Dakota, U.S.
- Burial place: Red Cloud Cemetery, Pine Ridge; 43°4′38″N 102°35′1″W
- Known for: Red Cloud's War; Most photographed American Indian of the nineteenth century
- Title: Tribal chief
- Successor: Jack Red Cloud
- Spouse: Pretty Owl (Mary Good Road)
- Children: 6

Red Cloud (Lakota: Maȟpíya Lúta; c. 1822 – December 10, 1909) was a leader of the Oglala Lakota from 1865 to 1909. He was one of the most capable Native American opponents whom the United States Army faced in the western territories. He led the Lakota to victory over the United States during Red Cloud's War, establishing the Lakota as the only nation to defeat the United States. The largest action of the war was the 1866 Fetterman Fight, with 81 US soldiers killed; it was the worst military defeat suffered by the US Army on the Great Plains until the Battle of the Little Bighorn 10 years later.

After signing the Treaty of Fort Laramie (1868), Red Cloud led his people in the transition to reservation life. Some of his opponents mistakenly thought of him as the overall leader of the Sioux groups (Dakota, Lakota, and Nakota), but the large tribe had several major divisions and was highly decentralized. Bands among the Oglala and other divisions operated independently, though some individual leaders were renowned as warriors and highly respected as leaders, such as Red Cloud.

== Early life ==
Red Cloud was born close to the forks of the Platte River, near the modern-day city of North Platte, Nebraska. His mother, Walks as She Thinks, was an Oglala Lakota and his father, Lone Man, was a Brulé Lakota leader. They came from two of the seven major Lakota divisions.

As was traditional among the matrilineal Lakota, in which the children belonged to the mother's clan and people, Red Cloud was mentored as a boy by his maternal uncle, Old Chief Smoke (1774–1864). Old Chief Smoke played a major role in the boy's childhood, as the leader of the Bad Faces. He brought Red Cloud into the Smoke household when the boy's parents died around 1825. At a young age, Red Cloud fought against neighboring Pawnee and Crow bands, gaining much war experience.

== Warriorship ==
=== Red Cloud's War ===
Red Cloud's War was the name the U.S. Army gave to a series of conflicts fought with Native American Plains tribes in the Wyoming and Montana Territories. The battles were waged between the Northern Cheyenne, allied with Lakota and Arapaho bands, against the Army from 1866 to 1868. In December 1866, the Native American allies attacked and defeated a United States unit in what they would call the Fetterman Massacre (or the Battle of the Hundred Slain), which resulted in the most U.S. casualties of any Plains battle up to that point.

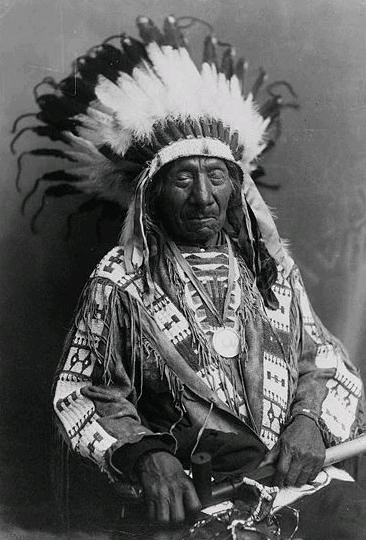
Red Cloud

Captain William J. Fetterman was sent from Fort Phil Kearny with two civilians and 79 cavalry and infantrymen to chase away a small Native American war party that had attacked a wood-gathering party days before. Captain Frederick Brown accompanied Fetterman; the two were confident in their troops and anxious to go to battle with the Native Americans. They disobeyed orders to stay behind the Lodge Trail Ridge and pursued a small decoy band of warriors led by a Native American on an injured horse. The decoy was the prominent warrior Crazy Horse. Fetterman and his troops followed the decoy into an ambush by more than 2,000 Sioux, Cheyenne, and Arapaho. Combined Native American forces suffered only 14 casualties, while they killed the entire 81-man U.S. detachment.

Following this battle, a U.S. peace commission toured the Plains in 1867 to gather information to help bring about peace among the tribes and with the U.S. Finding that the Native Americans had been provoked by white encroachment and competition for resources, the commission recommended assigning definite territories to the Plains tribes. The Lakota, Northern Cheyenne, Arapaho, and other bands settled for peace with the U.S. under the Treaty of Fort Laramie. The U.S. agreed to abandon its forts and withdraw from Lakota territory.

=== Treaty of 1868 ===
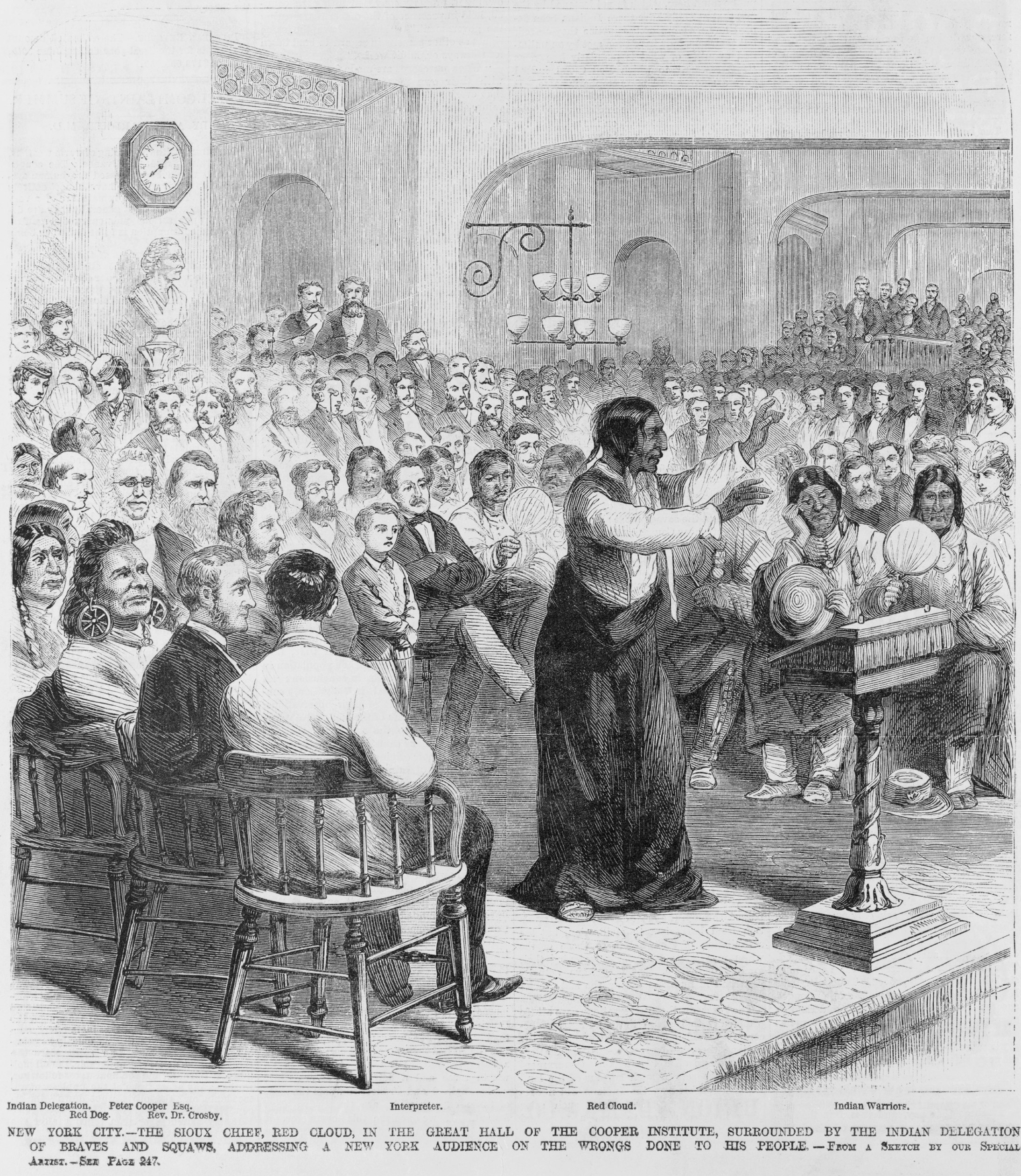
Original caption: “Red Cloud, in the Great Hall of the Cooper Institute, surrounded by the Indian delegation of braves and squaws [sic], addressing a New York audience on the wrongs done to his people”

The treaty established the Great Sioux Reservation, covering the territory of West River, west of the Missouri River in present-day Nebraska (which had been admitted as a state in 1867), and including parts of South Dakota. Uneasy relations between the expanding United States and the natives continued. In 1870, Red Cloud visited Washington D.C. and met with Commissioner of Indian Affairs Ely S. Parker (a Seneca and U.S. Army General), and President Ulysses S. Grant.

In 1871, the government established the Red Cloud Agency on the Platte River, downstream from Fort Laramie. By 1874 it had been moved to Nebraska, with Fort Robinson located nearby. Red Cloud took his band to the agency (a predecessor of the Native American reservation), ready to receive government aid. Yet that aid was usually less than stipulated, and usually inferior in quality.

According to Charles A. Eastman (Ohiyesa) Red Cloud was the last to sign "..having refused to do so until all of the forts within their territory should be vacated. All of his demands were acceded to, the new road abandoned, the garrisons withdrawn, and the new treaty distinctly stated that the Black Hills and the Big Horn were Indian countries, set apart for their perpetual occupancy and that no white man should enter that region without the consent of the Sioux. ... Scarcely was this treaty signed, however, when gold was discovered in the Black Hills, and the popular cry was: "Remove the Indians!"... The government, at first, entered some small protest, just enough to "save its face"... but there was no serious attempt to prevent the wholesale violation of the treaty and the loss of the Black Hills."

=== Great Sioux War of 1876 ===
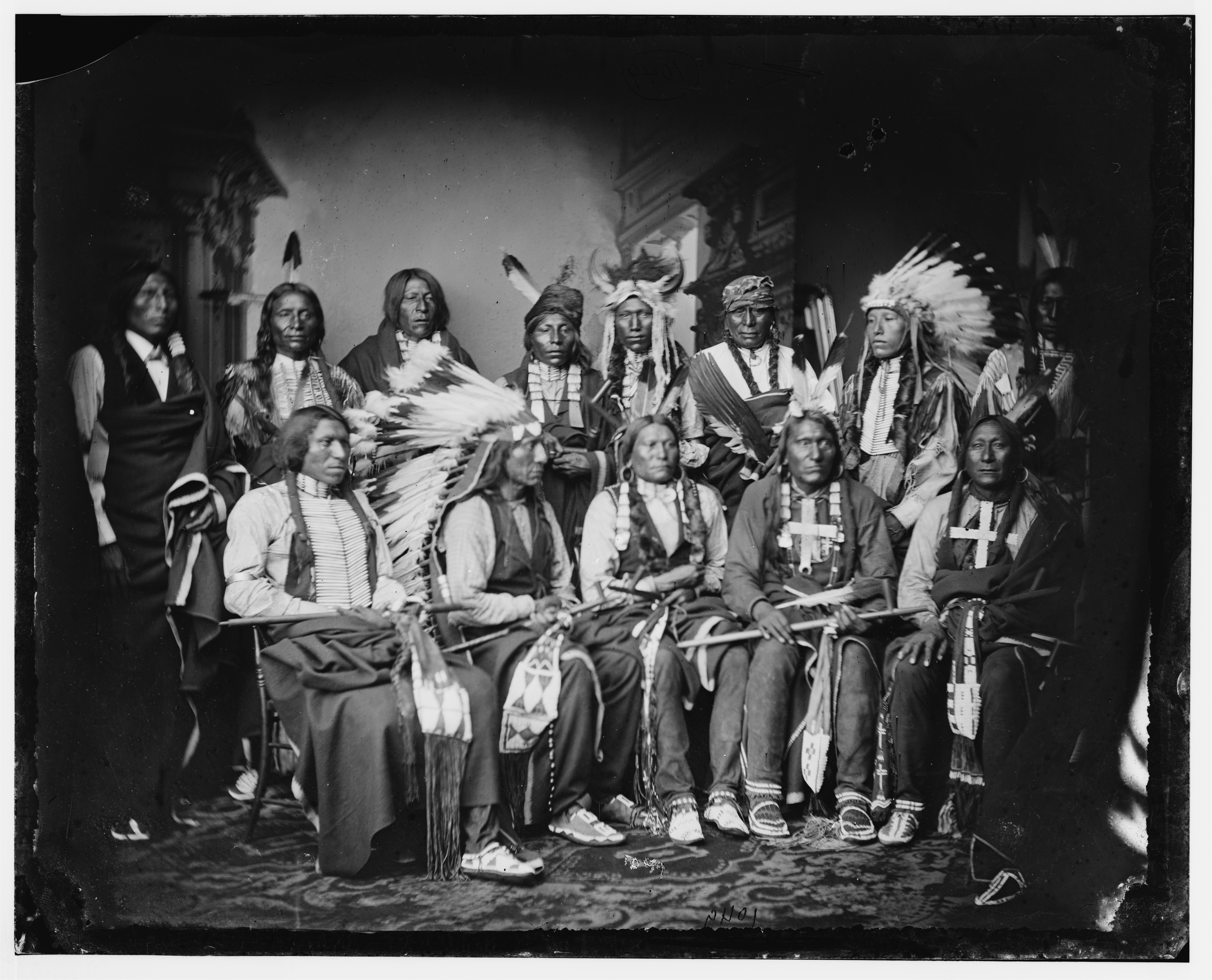
Seated, L to R: Yellow Bear, Red Cloud, Big Road, Little Wound, Black Crow; Standing, L to R: Red Bear, They Fear Even His Horses, Good Voice, Ring Thunder, Iron Crow, White Tail, Young Spotted Tail, ca. 1860–1880

Red Cloud settled at the agency with his band by the fall of 1873. He soon became embroiled in a controversy with the new Indian agent, Dr. John J. Saville.

In 1874, Lieutenant Colonel George Custer led a reconnaissance mission into Sioux territory that reported gold in the Black Hills, an area held sacred by the local Native Americans. Previously, the army had unsuccessfully tried to keep miners out of the region, and the threat of violence grew. In May 1875, Lakota delegations headed by Red Cloud, Spotted Tail, and Lone Horn traveled to Washington in an attempt to persuade President Grant to honor existing treaties and stem the flow of miners into their lands. The Native Americans met on various occasions with Grant, Secretary of the Interior Delano, and Commissioner of Indian Affairs Smith. He told them on May 27 that Congress was ready to resolve the matter by paying the tribes $25,000 for their land and resettling them into Indian Territory. The delegates refused to sign such a treaty, with Spotted Tail saying about the proposal:

When I was here before, the President gave me my country, and I put my stake down in a good place, and there I want to stay. ... You speak of another country, but it is not my country; it does not concern me, and I want nothing to do with it. I was not born there. ... If it is such a good country, you ought to send the white men now in our country there and let us alone.

Although Red Cloud was unsuccessful in finding a peaceful solution, he did not take part in the Great Sioux War of 1876, which was led by Tȟašúŋke Witkó (Crazy Horse) and Tȟatȟáŋka Íyotake (Sitting Bull).

In the fall of 1877, the Red Cloud Agency was removed to the upper Missouri River. The following year, it was removed to the forks of the White River in present-day South Dakota, where it was renamed the Pine Ridge Indian Reservation.

== Later life and death ==
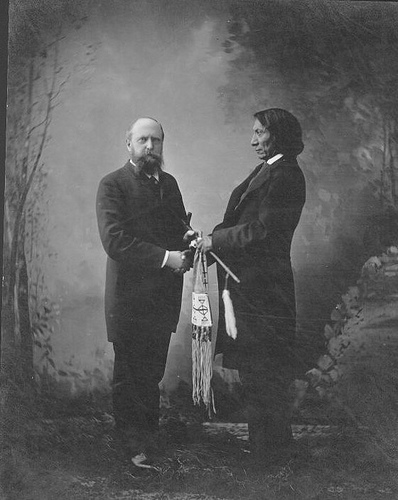
Othniel Marsh and Red Cloud pictured in New Haven, Connecticut, c. 1880

Red Cloud became a leader of the Lakota as they transitioned from the freedom of the plains to the confinement of the reservation system. His trip to Washington, DC, had convinced him of the number and power of European Americans, and he believed the Oglala had to seek peace.

Around 1880, he visited (not for the first time) the paleontologist and geologist Othniel Marsh in New Haven, Connecticut. Marsh had first visited the Red Cloud Agency in 1874, alleging, among other things, that "the Indians suffered for want of food and other supplies because they were cheated out of annuities and beef cattle and were issued inedible pork, inferior flour, poor sugar and coffee and rotten tobacco."

In 1884, he and his family, along with five other leaders, converted and were baptized as Catholics by Father Joseph Bushman.

Red Cloud continued fighting for his people, even after being forced onto the reservation. In 1887, he opposed the Dawes Act, which broke up communal tribal holdings and allocated 160-acre (65 ha) plots of land for subsistence farming to heads of families on tribal rolls. The U.S. declared additional communal tribal lands as excess and sold them to immigrant settlers. In 1889, Red Cloud opposed a treaty to sell more of the Lakota land. Due to his steadfastness, and that of Sitting Bull, government agents obtained the necessary signatures for approval only through subterfuge, such as using the signatures of children. Red Cloud negotiated strongly with Indian Agents such as Dr. Valentine McGillycuddy.

In 1909, Red Cloud died on Pine Ridge Reservation. At 87 years old, he outlived nearly all the other major Lakota leaders of the Indian Wars. He was buried there in a cemetery that now bears his name. In old age, he is quoted as having said, "They made us many promises, more than I can remember. But they kept but one – They promised to take our land ... and they took it."

== Legacy and honors ==
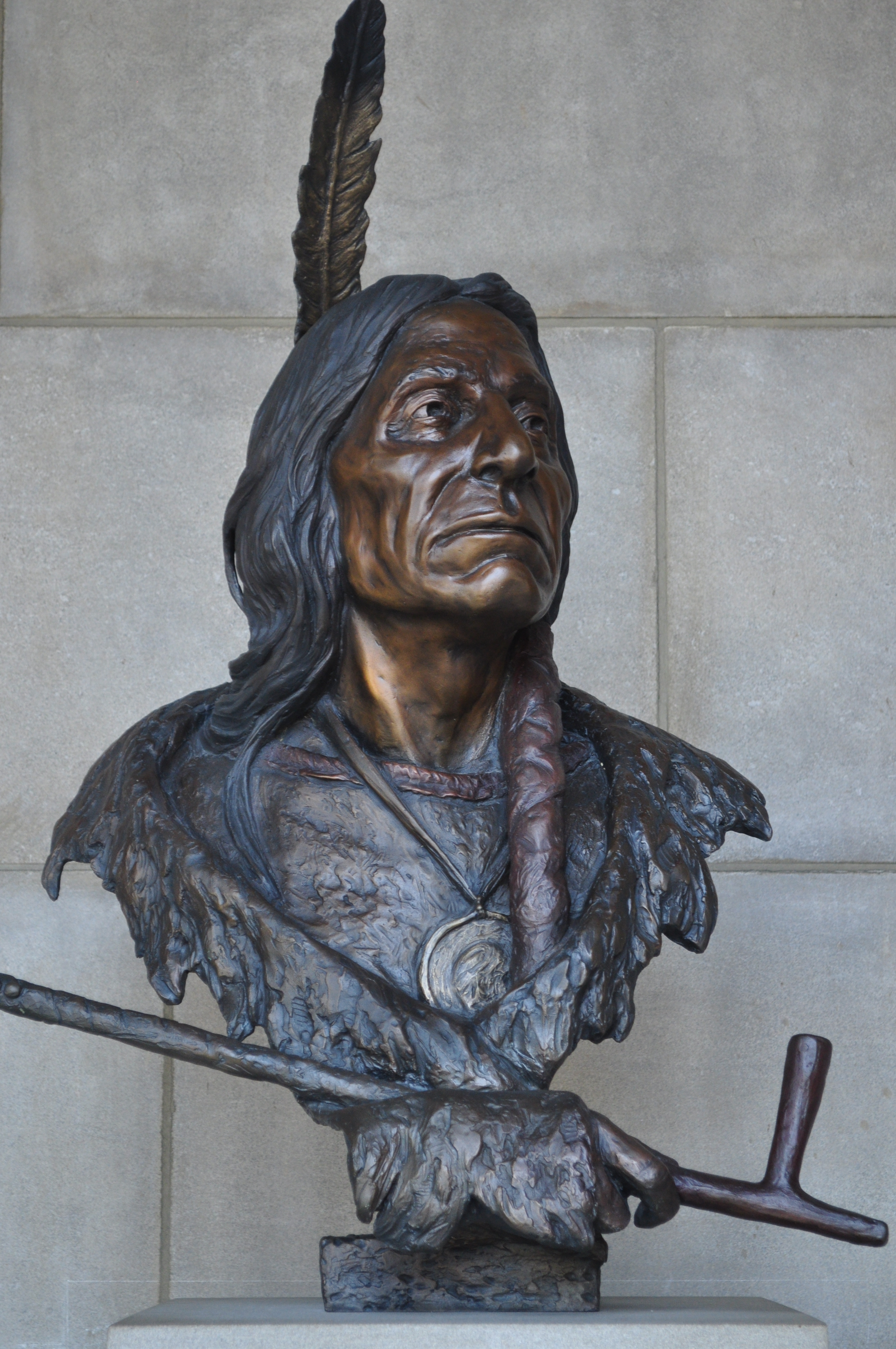
Bust of Red Cloud created by Jim Brothers in 2001 for the Nebraska Hall of Fame.

Announcements of Red Cloud's death and recognition of his achievements were printed in major newspapers across the country. As had been typical of the U.S. perception during Red Cloud's prominence in war, The New York Times article on his death mistakenly described him as leader of all the Sioux bands and tribes but noted his abilities as a leader and diplomat. This misconception was echoed by early white historians such as Grace Raymond Hebard and Earl Alonzo Brininstool, who judged "Red Napoleon of the Plains" a "most fitting title" for Red Cloud. While he was a prominent leader, the Lakota were highly decentralized and never had one overall leader, especially in the major divisions, such as Oglala and Brulé.

In 1871, the town of Red Cloud was named in his honor.

Red Cloud was the most photographed American Indian of the nineteenth century. There are 128 known photographs picturing Red Cloud. He was first photographed in 1872 in Washington D.C. by Mathew Brady, just before meeting with President Grant. He was also among the Indians photographed by Edward S. Curtis.

He has been honored by the United States Postal Service with a 10¢ Great Americans series postage stamp.

In 2000, he was posthumously inducted into the Nebraska Hall of Fame.

In 1888, a parochial school on the Pine Ridge Reservation was established at the request of Red Cloud. The Red Cloud Indian School remains in use over a century later. In 2023, the school elected to rebrand to the Lakota language translation of Red Cloud’s name - ‘Maȟpíya Lúta’

Theodore Sorensen wrote in Kennedy that President John F. Kennedy considered naming one of the 41 for Freedom ballistic missile submarines after Red Cloud, but bowed to Pentagon concerns that the name could be misinterpreted as being pro-Communist, owing to the symbolism of the time of using the color red to represent Communism.

== Descendants of Red Cloud ==
Red Cloud's descendants have continued to be chosen as traditional leaders of the Lakota people:

- Jackson "Jack" Red Cloud, (c. 1858–1918) leader of the Oglala Lakota 1909–1918
- James Henry Red Cloud (1877–1960) leader of the Oglala Lakota 1918–1960
- Edgar RedCloud (1898-1977) Son of James RedCloud.
- Charles Red Cloud (1884–1980) (brother of James Henry Red Cloud), leader of the Oglala Lakota 1960–1979
- Oliver Red Cloud (1919–2013) (son of Charles Red Cloud), leader of the Oglala Lakota (1979–2013). He was a fourth-generation direct descendant of Red Cloud. He was a Speaker of the traditional Lakota Sioux Nation and a chairman of the Black Hills Sioux Nation Treaty Council.

== See also ==
- Black Elk
- Bone Wars
- Charles Eastman
- Chief Joseph
- Crazy Horse
- Fetterman Fight
- Geronimo
- Sitting Bull
