= 2026 in North Dakota =

- Decades: 2000s; 2010s; 2020s
- See also: History of North Dakota; Historical outline of North Dakota; List of years in North Dakota; 2026 in the United States

The following is a list of events of the year 2026 in North Dakota.

== Incumbents ==
=== State government ===
- Governor: Kelly Armstrong (R)
- Lieutenant Governor: Michelle Strinden (R)

== Events ==
- April 25 – State Representative Liz Conmy (D-Fargo) and another person are killed in a plane crash in Minnesota.
- July 4 – The Theodore Roosevelt Presidential Library opens in Medora.
- November 3:
  - 2026 North Dakota House of Representatives election
  - 2026 North Dakota Senate election
  - 2026 United States House of Representatives election in North Dakota: Julie Fedorchak wins reelection.

== See also ==
- 2026 in the United States
