= 2025 in North Dakota =

- Decades: 2000s; 2010s; 2020s
- See also: History of North Dakota; Historical outline of North Dakota; List of years in North Dakota; 2025 in the United States

Aerial view of North Dakota during the 2025 U.S. Fish and Wildlife Service Waterfowl Breeding Population and Habitat Survey.

The following is a list of events of the year 2025 in North Dakota.

== Incumbents ==
=== State government ===
- Governor: Kelly Armstrong (R)
- Lieutenant Governor: Michelle Strinden (R)

== Events ==
- January 6 – North Dakota State beats Montana State 35–32 to win the 2025 NCAA Division I Football Championship Game, earning their tenth overall title.
- February 25 – The North Dakota House of Representatives votes for a resolution that calls for the US Supreme Court to reconsider its 2015 Obergefell v. Hodges same sex marriage decision.
- February 27 – Minot based Christian radio station KHRT ceases operations.
- May 2 – 2025 Southwest United States measles outbreak: North Dakota Health and Human Services confirms the state's first measles case since 2011.
- June 20 – An EF5 tornado kills three people in the Enderlin area.
- July 18 – A B-52 bomber flies near a SkyWest flight from Minneapolis–Saint Paul, forcing the commercial flight to make a sharp turn to avoid it. The SkyWest flight lands safely at Minot International Airport. The Air Force says the B-52 was conducting surveillance of the North Dakota State Fair, also in Minot.
- October 8 – A district judge upholds North Dakota's ban on gender-affirming care for minors.
- November 21 – The State Supreme Court upholds a law that bans abortions in the state.

== Deaths ==
- January 22 – Neil Hensrud, 84, politician, member of the North Dakota House of Representatives (1974–1976).
- February 18 – Josh Christy, 43, politician, member of the North Dakota House of Representatives (since 2022).

== See also ==
- 2025 in the United States
