= 2022 in North Dakota =

- Decades: 2000s; 2010s; 2020s
- See also: History of North Dakota; Historical outline of North Dakota; List of years in North Dakota; 2022 in the United States

The following is a list of events of the year 2022 in North Dakota.

== Incumbents ==
=== State government ===
- Governor: Doug Burgum (R)
- Lieutenant Governor: Tammy Miller (R)

== Events ==
- May 27 – North Dakota reports 960 cases of COVID-19 and confirms their first case of the Omicron BA.4 variant.
- September 18 – Killing of Cayler Ellingson
- November 8 – 2022 North Dakota Agriculture Commissioner election.

== See also ==
- 2022 in the United States
