= 2021 in North Dakota =

- Decades: 2000s; 2010s; 2020s
- See also: History of North Dakota; Historical outline of North Dakota; List of years in North Dakota; 2021 in the United States

The following is a list of events of the year 2021 in North Dakota.

== Incumbents ==
=== State government ===
- Governor: Doug Burgum (R)
- Lieutenant Governor: Tammy Miller (R)

== Events ==
Ongoing: COVID-19 pandemic in North Dakota

- Williston School District 1 and Williams County Public School District 8 merge to create the Williston Basin School District 7.
- January 2 – New data including coronavirus numbers from the New Year's Day holiday put North Dakota's death toll past 1,300 cumulatively.

== See also ==
- 2021 in the United States
