= 1889 in North Dakota =

- Decades: 1880s; 1890s; 1900s
- See also: History of North Dakota; Historical outline of North Dakota; List of years in North Dakota; 1889 in the United States

The following is a list of events of the year 1889 in North Dakota.

== Incumbents ==
=== State government ===
- Governor: John Miller (R) (starting November 20)

== Events ==
- November 2 – The Dakota Territory is admitted to the union of the United States, with North Dakota becoming the 39th U.S state.
- October 1 – 1889 North Dakota gubernatorial election.
- November 20 – John Miller wins the gubernatorial election, becoming the first governor of North Dakota.

== See also ==
- 1889 in the United States
