= Elwyn B. Robinson =

American historian

- Born: Elwyn Burns Robinson; October 13, 1905; Geauga County, Ohio, United States
- Died: March 24, 1985 (aged 79)
- Education: Oberlin College; Western Reserve University; University of North Dakota
- Awards: Alumni Distinguished Teaching Award; Distinguished Service Award
- Scientific career
- Fields: American History
- Workplaces: University of North Dakota

Elwyn B. Robinson (October 10, 1905 – March 24, 1985) was an American historian of the North American Great Plains who focused on the US state of North Dakota. He was a professor of history at the University of North Dakota from 1953 until his retirement in 1970. He is notable both for his radio presentations “Heroes of Dakota” and for his comprehensive work History of North Dakota, which received the Award of Merit of the American Association for State and Local History. The history contained his most famous thesis, the six themes of North Dakota history, which were widely publicized and reprinted and proved to be a dominant force in the historiography of North Dakota in the second half of the twentieth century.

== Early life ==
Robinson was born on a farm in Geauga County, Ohio on October 13, 1905. Nine years later his family moved to a suburb of Cleveland, Ohio. In high school he had a strong interest in literature and poetry, and interest that led to the start of his academic career, not in history, but in English. After completing his undergraduate degree, Robinson went on to be the principle of a small high school in New Lyrne, Ohio in 1928. In addition to his duties as an administrator and an English teacher, he also coached several sports. Robinson had long-time interest in a variety of sports including baseball, basketball, handball, and tennis. In 1930 he took a position teaching English at the Old Trail School in Akron, Ohio. While working there, he read Mark Sullivan's Our Times: The United States, 1900–1925, which convinced him to change his field and pursue academic study in history.

== Academic training ==
Robinson began his academic career at Oberlin College in Ohio where he majored in English. He took several courses in European history while pursuing his degree, but never took any courses in American history. Later, after a period teaching high school English he went on to pursue his MA at Western Reserve University where he completed his thesis, “John W. Forney and the Philadelphia Press”. He then continued his work studying Philadelphia newspapers in preparation for his doctoral dissertation before accepting a teaching position at the University of North Dakota in 1936 where he completed his dissertation and earned his PhD.

== Academic career ==
Robinson spent his entire academic career at the University of North Dakota from 1936 until his retirement in 1970. Although his historical interests were originally seated in Philadelphia, Robinson's interests slowly shifted to the history of his adopted state. Beginning in 1947 he began writing a series of radio programs, Heroes of Dakota, which featured biographic sketches of major historical figures in the state, and subsequently began teaching a course in North Dakota history. This interest in state history came to define his career for the next two decades. In addition to his academic writings he was also an accomplished instructor, and in 1959 received the Alumni Distinguished Teaching Award and becoming one of the first four people to receive the award.

== Writings ==
Robinson published numerous articles and several books over the course of his career. His two most important works were Heroes of Dakota, a two-volume series featuring writeups from his popular radio presentation of the same name which aired intermittently on the university's radio station between 1947 and 1949, and History of North Dakota, which built upon a popular speech he delivered in 1958. History of North Dakota refined Robinson's most notable contribution: his theory of six themes of North Dakota History.

== Robinson’s Six Themes of North Dakota History ==
1. Remoteness, meaning the state was greatly influenced by the physical differences in space from the country's major activity centers.
2. Dependence, indicating the state's status as a colonial or provincial space adjacent to chief centers.
3. Radicalism, referring the resistance of North Dakotan's to their dependent status.
4. Economic disadvantage, resulting from the state's dependence on agriculture and the persistence of a lower than average per capita income in the state.
5. The “Too-Much Mistake”, a concept that referred over-investment in infrastructure beyond what could reasonably be maintained by the state and its small population.
6. Adjustment to the imperatives of a cool, subhumid grassland, meaning that life in North Dakota changed to accommodate the requirements of its physical environment.

Although History of North Dakota was widely received with excellent reviews at the time with one reviewer going so far as to claim that calling it a history to be a “gross understatement”, Robinson's concept of the “Too Much Mistake” has since come under some criticism for not adequately examining the underlying reasons for the mistake.

== Retirement and death ==
Following his retirement in 1970 Robinson continued to write about North Dakota history and remained active in the Grand Forks community. He died in March, 1985.
