= Little Soldier =

Former head chief of the Yankton Dakota

Little Soldier was the head chief of the Yankton Dakota. He was a member of a delegation that signed a treaty with the United States government on June 22, 1825. He signed the Treaty of Fort Laramie in 1868. He also took part in the Battle of Little Bighorn.
