= 2023 in North Dakota =

- Decades: 2000s; 2010s; 2020s
- See also: History of North Dakota; Historical outline of North Dakota; List of years in North Dakota; 2023 in the United States

The following is a list of events of the year 2023 in North Dakota.

== Incumbents ==
=== State government ===
- Governor: Doug Burgum (R)
- Lieutenant Governor: Tammy Miller (R)

== Events ==
- March 27 – A train transporting hazardous materials derails near Wyndmere, with 31 out of 70 train cars damaged.
- June 7 – Governor Doug Burgum announces his candidacy for President of the United States in 2024.
- October 1 – North Dakota state senator Doug Larsen and his family are killed in a plane crash in Grand County, Utah.
- December 4 – Governor Doug Burgum withdraws his candidacy for president.

== See also ==
- 2023 in the United States
