= 2024 in North Dakota =

- Decades: 2000s; 2010s; 2020s
- See also: History of North Dakota; Historical outline of North Dakota; List of years in North Dakota; 2024 in the United States

The following is a list of events of the year 2024 in North Dakota.

== Incumbents ==
=== State government ===
- Governor: Doug Burgum (R) (until December 15), Kelly Armstrong (R) (starting December 15)
- Lieutenant Governor: Tammy Miller (R) (until December 15), Michelle Strinden (R) (starting December 15)

== Events ==
- March 4 – The 2024 North Dakota Republican presidential caucuses are held. Donald Trump wins with 84.4% of the vote.
- March 22 – 30:
  - 2024 North Dakota Democratic presidential primary
- November 5 – 2024 United States presidential election in North Dakota

== See also ==
- 2024 in the United States
