= History of North Dakota (book) =

- Author: Elwyn B. Robinson
- Illustrator: Jack Brodie
- Language: English
- Subject: North Dakota--History
- Publisher: University of Nebraska Press
- Publication date: 1966
- Publication place: United States
- Media type: Print
- Pages: 610 pp
- ISBN: 0-911042-43-1
- OCLC: 33266680
- Dewey Decimal: 978.4
- LC Class: F636 .R6 1995

The History of North Dakota is a book written by Elwyn B. Robinson covering the history of the U.S. state of North Dakota. The book's coverage spans from several thousand years ago at the time when Native Americans first settled the area that would become present-day North Dakota up through the 20th Century. The book, published by University of Nebraska Press in 1966, was the first scholarly book covering the full-scope of North Dakota's history and has remained the definitive history of the state. The first edition contained 599 pages, 32 pages of illustration, and line drawings by Jack Brodie.

Elwyn B. Robinson (1905–1985) was a professor of history at the University of North Dakota in Grand Forks. At the 75th Anniversary Convocation of UND on November 6, 1958, Robinson presented a speech entitled "The Themes of North Dakota History." The speech received great attention and would eventually result in the publication of History of North Dakota in 1966. The book won the Award of Merit of the American Association for State and Local History.

== Themes in North Dakota history ==
In his seminal History of North Dakota, Robinson identified six themes in Nortn Dakota history:

- Remoteness
- Dependence
- Radicalism
- Economic disadvantage
- The "too-much mistake"
- Adjustment

== See also ==
- History of North Dakota
