= Early Indian treaty territories in North Dakota =

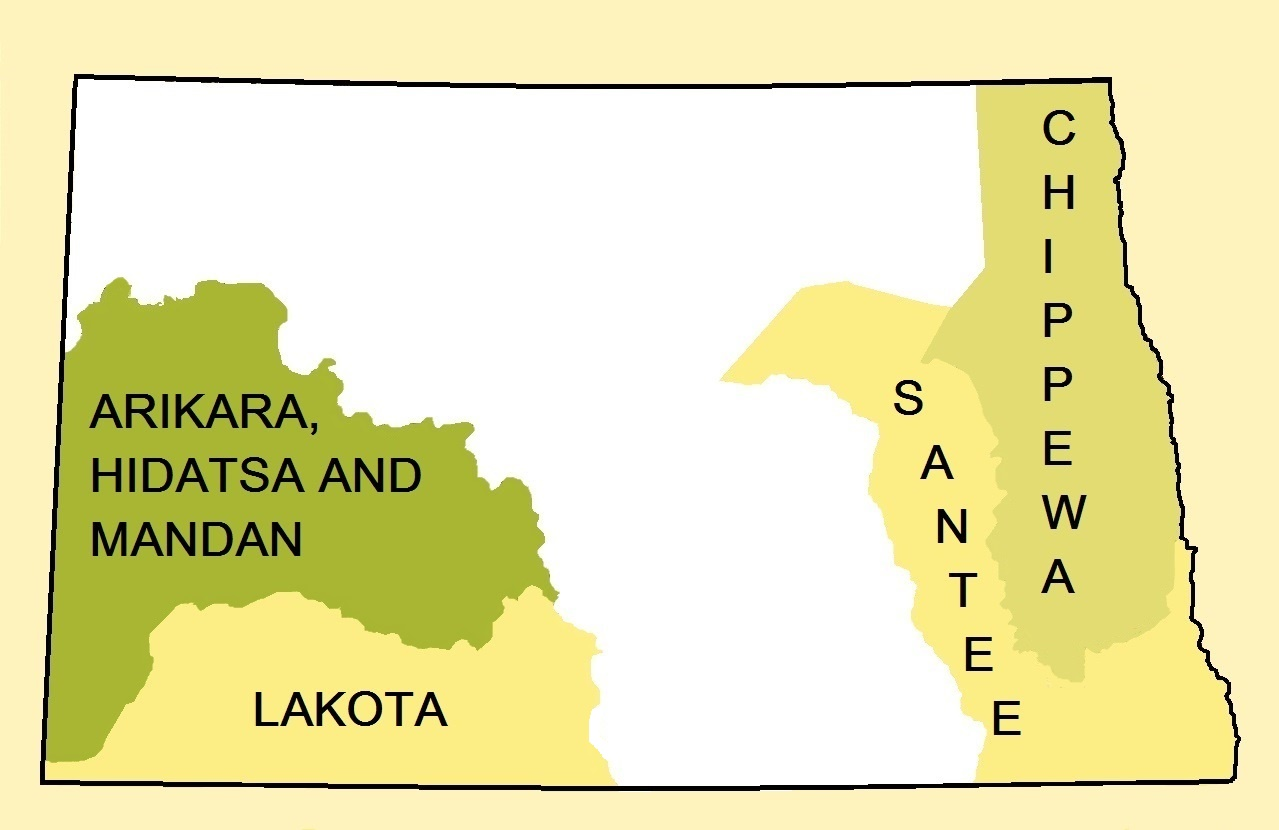
Early Indian treaty territories, North Dakota - an overview map

Native Americans from various tribes lived in North Dakota before the arrival of settlers. With time, a number of treaties and agreements were signed between the Indians and the newcomers. Many of the treaties defined the domain of a specific group of Indians. The three maps below show the treaty territories of different Indians living in North Dakota and how the territories changed and diminished over time in the 19th century.

(The Dakota Territory became a reality on March 2, 1861. Most treaties and agreements antedate the final division of the territory into the Dakotas. For sake of convenience, "North Dakota" is used in the text instead of "present-day North Dakota". The narrow tracks of Indian territories in the southernmost part of North Dakota is not discussed here, since they were segments of considerable areas in South Dakota.)

== Map 1 ==
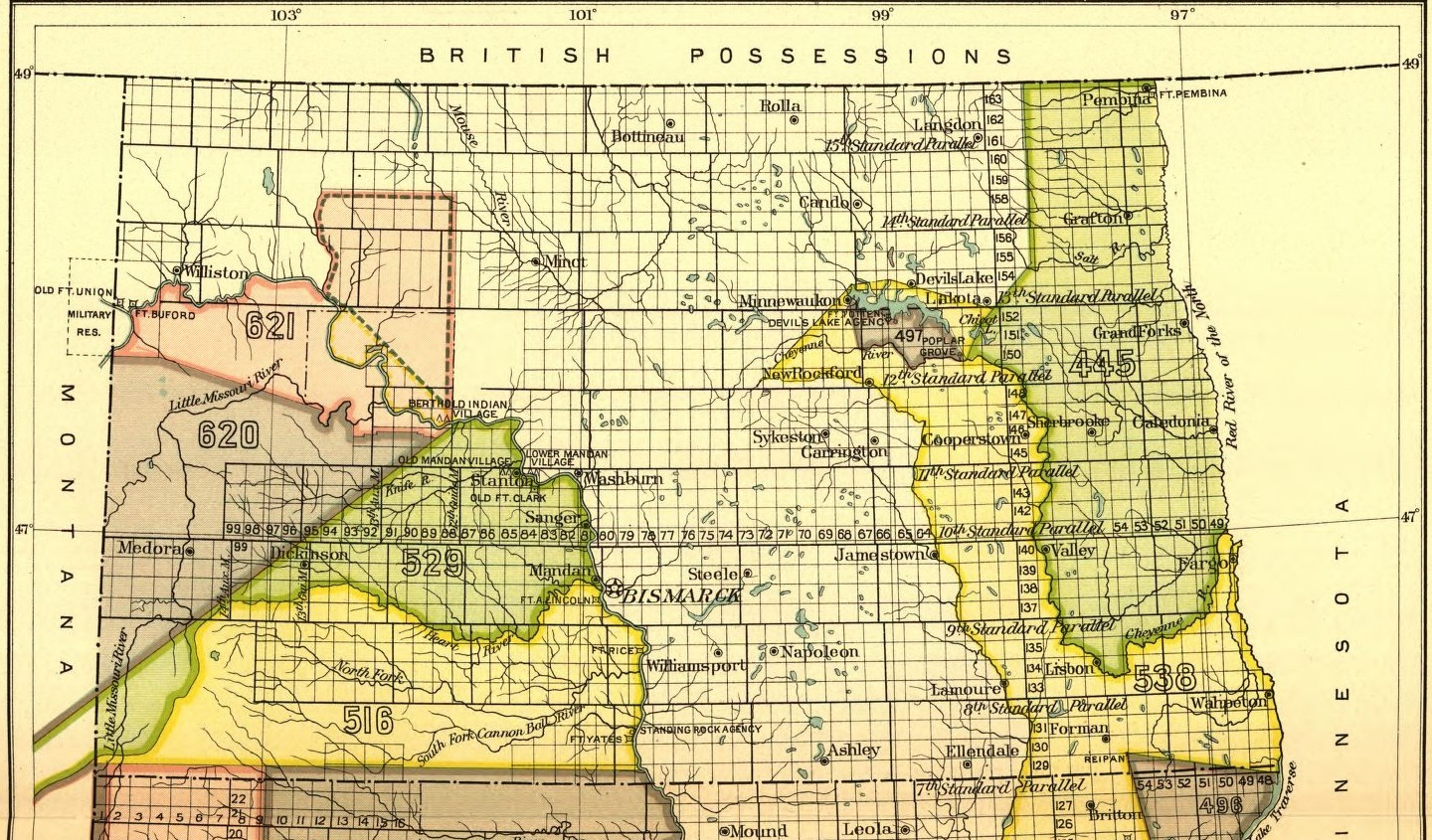
Early Indian treaty territories, North Dakota. Map 1 (1851–1891)

== Area 445 (map 1) ==
Area 445 was the land of the Red Lake and Pembina bands of the Chippewa. It extended eastward into Minnesota. The Indians ceded the entire area in North Dakota on October 2, 1863 and gathered in unceded land in Minnesota.

== Areas 496, 497 and 538 (map 1) ==
The Sisseton and Wahpeton bands of the Santee Sioux claimed these areas, with area 538 extending around 75 miles into South Dakota. On February 19, 1867, they allowed the construction of roads and railroads through it. The Indians ceded no land with the signing of this treaty. Two reservations were established. Area 496 indicates the Sisseton reservation at Lake Traverse in the South. A northern reservation adjoined Devil's Lake (area 497). On September 20, 1872, the Indians ceded the yellow area 538. The agreement (modified by amendments) was ratified on June 22, 1874. By "agreement" and "Act of Congress", all unallotted land in Lake Traverse Indian Reservation (area 496) was ceded to the United States on March 3, 1891.

== Area 516 (map 1) ==
This area west of Missouri River and south of Heart River was recognized as a part of a larger Lakota territory in the Treaty of Fort Laramie (1851). To end Red Cloud's War, a new Fort Laramie treaty was negotiated, accepted and dated April 29, 1868. The Lakotas ceded area 516 in North Dakota to the United States. At the same time, they agreed to live in The Great Sioux Reservation mainly located west of the Missouri in South Dakota.

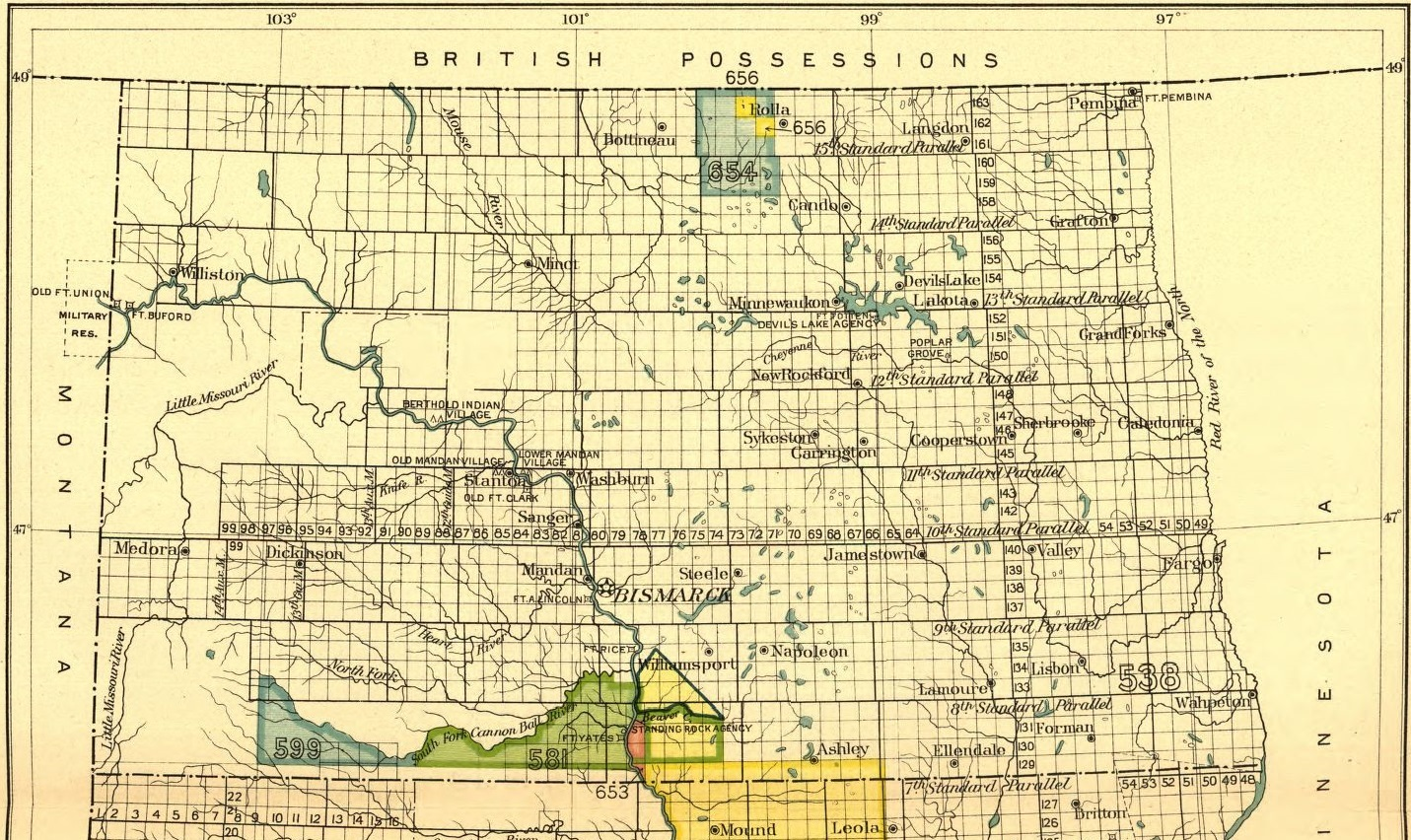
Indian territories, North Dakota. Map 2 (1875–1889)

=== Areas 581, 599 and 653 (map 2) ===
By executive order of March 16, 1875, some of the land ceded in 1868 turned back into the holdings of the Sioux tribe (green area 581) and also extra land east of the Missouri (the area framed with a green line). The small area east of the river adjoined an existing Yankton Sioux Reservation chiefly in South Dakota (the yellow area). Later, on August 9, 1879, some of this new, eastern land was relinquished by executive order (the yellow area framed with green).

Nearly three months after the Battle of the Little Bighorn, the Sioux "ceded all claim" to about one-quarter of the Great Sioux Reservation in South Dakota in a controversial agreement. This agreement of September 9, 1876, added an extra tract to the Sioux land in North Dakota (blue area 599). It was end-to-end with a part of the northern border of what was left of the Great Sioux Reservation as well as area 581 added the year before. On November 28, still 1876, the "President makes another addition" to the Sioux land east of the Missouri by executive order. This section is only indicated by the pointed area delimited by dark blue lines. By another executive order of August 9, 1879, the very same area was restored to "public domain". A small tract of land bordering the Missouri returned into the holding of the United States by executive order of March 20, 1884 (light scarlet area 653). Area 599, added in 1876, was subtracted again on March 2, 1889, by act of Congress. (An earlier act to the same effect came not into force, "because of failure to obtain the consent of the Sioux". The new act was passed "with the understanding that it would be accepted. The agreement thereto was proclaimed by the President Feb. 10, 1890.")

== Areas 529, 620 and the part of 621 south of the Missouri (map 1) ==
These three ranges together show the mutual Indian territory of the Arikara, Hidatsa and Mandan as defined in the Treaty of Fort Laramie (1851). It extended into Montana and Wyoming. Area 529 turned into U.S. territory on April 12, 1870, by executive order. The Fort Berthold Reservation was established on the same occasion. Further, the United States recognized a narrow tract north of the Missouri as Arikara, Hidatsa and Mandan territory (indicated by the yellow, dotted line). This was crucial to the Indians, since they had their only permanent settlement - Like-a-Fishhook Village - located here. Another executive order of July 13, 1880, subtracted area 620 from the tribes' holdings.

=== Areas 712, 713 and 716 (map 3 -below) ===
However, extra land straight north of the Missouri made up for some of the loss. Combined area 712 and 713 show the total expense of the Fort Berthold Reservation in 1880. Area 712 was ceded to the United States on December 14, 1886, by agreement (ratified on March 3, 1891). Area 713 shows the reduced holdings of the Arikara, Hidatsa and Mandan. The acreage of the reservation increased slightly with the addition of a small tract on the east side of it on June 17, 1892, by executive order (area 716).

== Map 3 ==
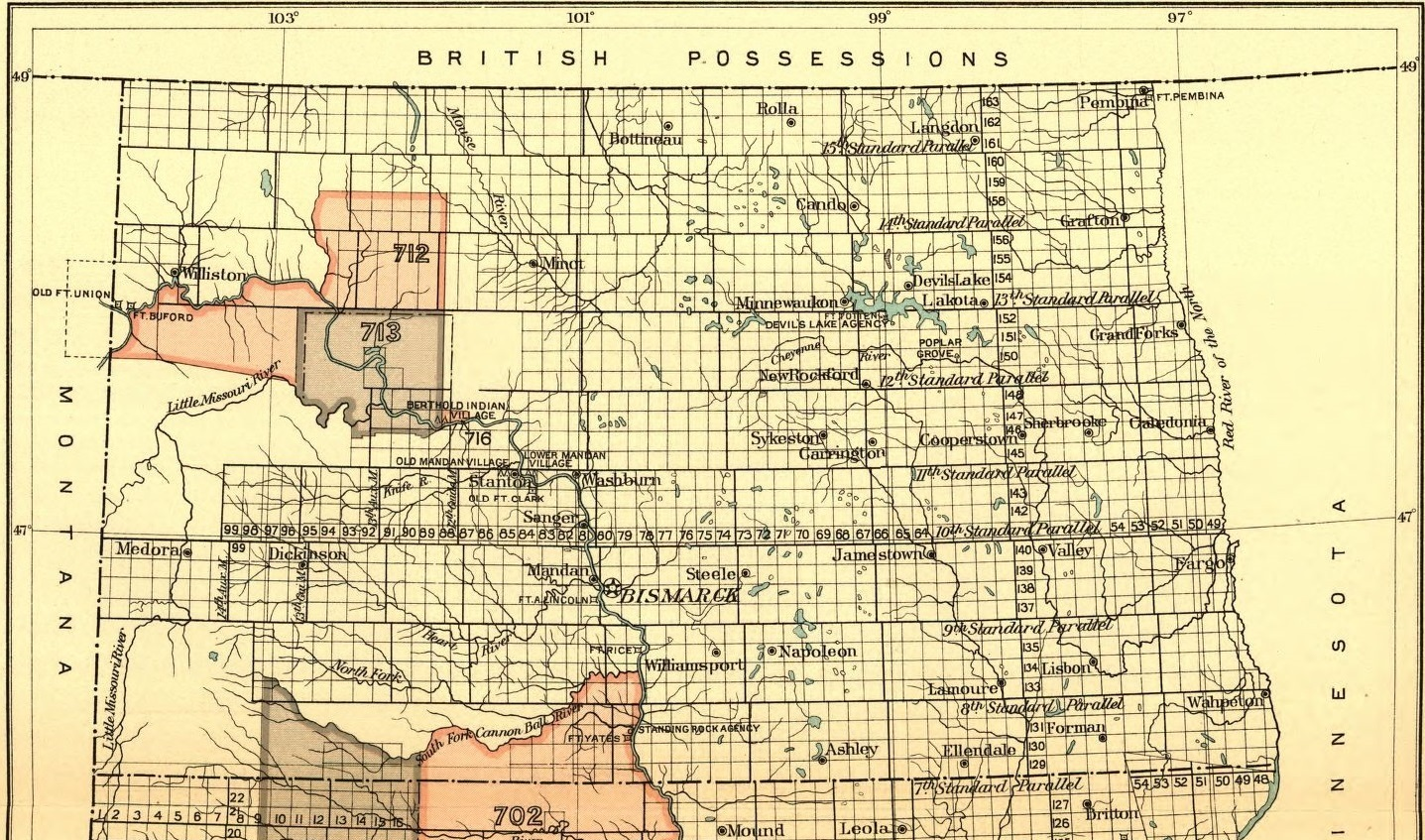
Indian territories, North Dakota. Map 3 (1880–1892)

== Areas 654 and 656 (map 2 and also section of map 2) ==
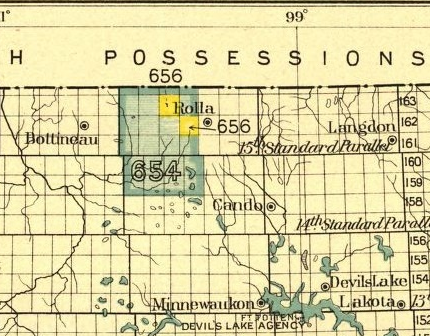
Turtle Mountain Chippewa reserve, 1882 and 1884. Section of map 2

The areas combined indicates a reserve for the Chippewa (Turtle Mountain band) established on December 21, 1882, by executive order. Two years later the major part of it was relinquished by executive order of March 29, 1884. The diminished reserve for the Turtle Mountain Chippewa is shown as two yellow survey townships. Within three months, the "President amends Executive order of Mar. 29, 1884" with its far from practical division of the reserve. The executive order of June 3, 1884, made the reserve a whole (the southern half of the reserve was moved one survey township westward – not shown on the map).
