= 2022 North Dakota Agriculture Commissioner election =

- November 8, 2022
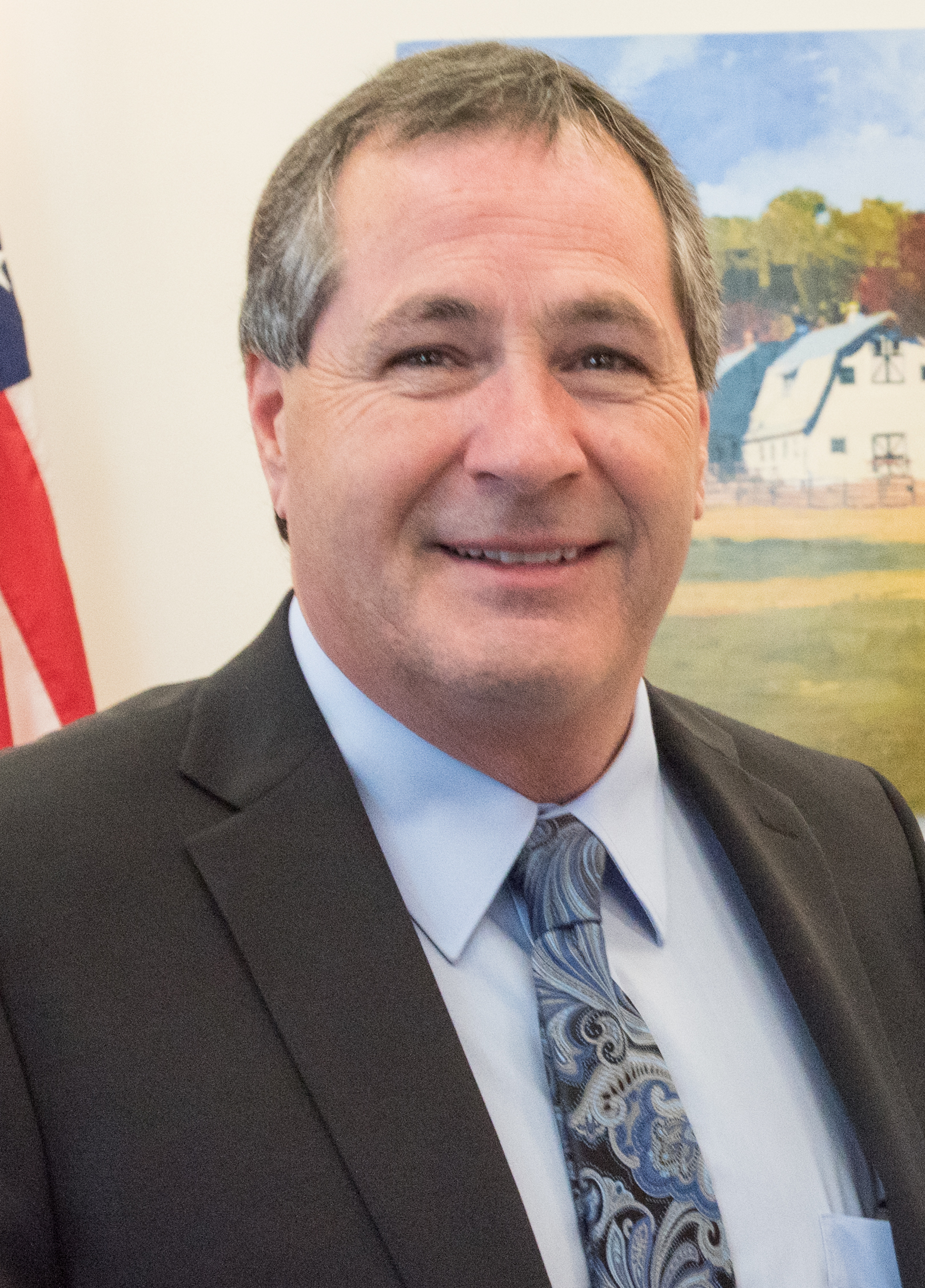

Nominee	Doug Goehring	Fintan L. Dooley
Party	Republican	Democratic–NPL
Popular vote	177,443	56,654
Percentage	75.67%	24.16%
- County results Goehring: 60–70% 70–80% 80–90% 90–100% Dooley: 50–60% 60–70%
Agriculture Commissioner before election
Doug Goehring
Republican
Elected Agriculture Commissioner
Doug Goehring
Republican

The 2022 North Dakota Agriculture Commissioner election was held on November 8, 2022, in order to elect the Agriculture commissioner of North Dakota. Incumbent Republican Agriculture Commissioner Doug Goehring was re-elected to a fourth term against North Dakota Democratic-NPL Party challenger Fintan L. Dooley.

== General election ==
On election day November 8, 2022, incumbent Agriculture Commissioner Doug Goehring was re-elected to a fourth term by a margin of 120,789 votes against his North Dakota Democratic-NPL Party opponent Fintan L. Dooley. Goehring was sworn in on January 1, 2023.

=== Results ===
General election results, 8 November 2022
Party	Candidate	Votes	%
Republican	Doug Goehring (incumbent)	177,443	75.67
Democratic–NPL	Fintan L. Dooley	56,654	24.16
Write-In		408	0.17
Total votes		234,505	100.00
Republican hold			

==== By county ====
County	Doug Goehring Republican		Fintan Dooley Democratic–NPL		All Others	
County	#	%	#	%	#	%
Adams	788	86.03%	128	13.97%	0	0.0%
Barnes	2,915	76.69%	883	23.23%	3	0.08%
Benson	945	65.31%	500	34.55%	2	0.14%
Billings	483	92.00%	42	8.00%	0	0.0%
Bottineau	2,352	83.67%	455	16.19%	4	0.14%
Bowman	1,186	88.97%	146	10.95%	1	0.08%
Burke	696	90.39%	74	9.61%	0	0.0%
Burleigh	27,392	79.49%	6,992	20.29%	76	0.22%
Cass	32,970	62.75%	19,488	37.09%	86	0.16%
Cavalier	1,282	84.12%	240	15.75%	2	0.13%
Dickey	1,435	81.86%	315	17.97%	3	0.17%
Divide	864	85.38%	147	14.53%	1	0.10%
Dunn	1,422	87.13%	208	12.75%	2	0.12%
Eddy	728	78.62%	195	21.06%	3	0.32%
Emmons	1,374	91.48%	120	7.99%	8	0.53%
Foster	1,040	84.69%	187	15.23%	1	0.08%
Golden Valley	675	88.35%	87	11.39%	2	0.26%
Grand Forks	12,292	67.07%	6,007	32.78%	27	0.15%
Grant	990	90.08%	109	9.92%	0	0.0%
Griggs	797	82.08%	172	17.71%	2	0.21%
Hettinger	912	89.32%	109	10.68%	0	0.0%
Kidder	921	87.46%	129	12.25%	3	0.28%
LaMoure	1,353	84.14%	254	15.80%	1	0.06%
Logan	738	91.22%	69	8.53%	2	0.25%
McHenry	1,808	84.96%	314	14.76%	6	0.28%
McIntosh	972	88.77%	122	11.14%	1	0.09%
McKenzie	2,696	85.78%	440	14.00%	7	0.22%
McLean	3,422	81.94%	745	17.84%	9	0.22%
Mercer	3,096	87.51%	434	12.27%	8	0.23%
Morton	8,963	81.22%	2,048	18.56%	24	0.22%
Mountrail	1,907	73.49%	686	26.44%	2	0.08%
Nelson	1,115	74.83%	374	25.10%	1	0.07%
Oliver	743	90.39%	78	9.49%	1	0.12%
Pembina	1,992	82.38%	424	17.54%	2	0.08%
Pierce	1,212	82.62%	255	17.38%	0	0.0%
Ramsey	3,095	78.31%	854	21.61%	3	0.08%
Ransom	1,257	71.14%	506	28.64%	4	0.23%
Renville	779	88.42%	102	11.58%	0	0.0%
Richland	4,507	78.19%	1,254	21.76%	3	0.05%
Rolette	1,280	47.76%	1,395	52.05%	5	0.19%
Sargent	1,153	74.68%	389	25.19%	2	0.13%
Sheridan	547	88.37%	71	11.47%	1	0.16%
Sioux	228	39.51%	347	60.14%	2	0.35%
Slope	281	93.36%	20	6.64%	0	0.0%
Stark	7,688	86.61%	1,175	13.24%	14	0.16%
Steele	579	74.61%	196	25.26%	1	0.13%
Stutsman	5,107	78.82%	1,356	20.93%	16	0.25%
Towner	673	80.21%	166	19.79%	0	0.0%
Traill	2,161	73.70%	761	25.95%	10	0.34%
Walsh	2,775	81.07%	641	18.73%	7	0.20%
Ward	13,126	79.75%	3,294	20.01%	38	0.23%
Wells	1,439	86.27%	226	13.55%	3	0.18%
Williams	6,292	87.07%	925	12.80%	9	0.12%
Totals	177,443	75.67%	56.654	24.16%	408	0.17%

Counties that flipped from Democratic to Republican

- Ransom (largest city: Lisbon)
- Sargent (largest city: Gwinner)
- Richland (largest city: Wahpeton)
