= Neil Hensrud =

American politician (1940–2025)

Member of the North Dakota House of Representatives from the 18th district
- In office December 1974 – December 1976

Personal details
- Born: October 25, 1940 Grand Forks, North Dakota, U.S.
- Died: January 22, 2025 (aged 84) Minneapolis, Minnesota, U.S.
- Party: Republican
- Spouse(s): Margaret Berge (m. 1962; div. 1988) Faith Harjala (m. 1989)
- Children: 5
- Parents: Sparky Hensrud (father); Adelaide Brusegaard (mother)

Neil Barry Hensrud (October 25, 1940 – January 22, 2025) was an American politician from the state of North Dakota. He served as a Republican member of the North Dakota House of Representatives from 1974 to 1976.

== Life and career ==
Hensrud was born on October 25, 1940, in Grand Forks, North Dakota, the son of Adelaide (née Brusegaard) and Ingman "Sparky" Hensrud, who served in the North Dakota House of Representatives from 1966 until his death in 1974. He earned bachelor's, master's and doctoral degrees from the University of North Dakota. He served in he U.S. Army and Army Reserve, serving as an assistant professor of military science and rising to the rank of lieutenant colonel.

Hensrud was elected to the Grand Forks city council in 1970, and rose to be vice president of that body. Following the death of his father, he was elected to the state house of representatives in 1974. He did not seek re-election to the state house in 1976, clearing the way for future North Dakota Attorney General Wayne Stenehjem to seek his seat. In March 1978, Hensrud was appointed to fill the seat of a Grand Forks County Commissioner who had died the previous week. In 1980, he announced he would run for mayor of Grand Forks, but withdrew, instead running a losing campaign for county superintendent of schools. While he filed for re-election as county commissioner in 1982, he accepted a job out of state and did not campaign.

Hensrud relocated to Wisconsin, accepting the job of director of the state's Small Business Development Center, and he went on to become a professor of business at the University of Wisconsin–Superior. After retiring in the early 2000s, he became a property development specialist in Lake Nebagamon, becoming a member and then president of the village board. He battled progressive supranuclear palsy in his later years, and died in Minneapolis on January 22, 2025.

== Electoral history ==
=== 1974 general election ===
North Dakota House of Representatives, District 18, 1974 general election * denotes incumbent Source:
Party	Candidate	Votes	%
Democratic	Charles E. Orange *	8,212	8.3
Democratic	Terry Irving	7,223	7.3
Democratic	Eliot Glassheim	6,850	6.9
Democratic	Ben G. Gustafson	6,776	6.9
Republican	Earl Strinden *	6,604	6.7
Republican	Art Raymond *	6,430	6.5
Republican	Neil Hensrud	6,374	6.4
Democratic	Dan Rylance	6,211	6.3
Democratic	Gene Martin	6,198	6.3
Republican	Paul Bridston *	5,887	6.0
Republican	Elynor Hendrickson *	5,774	5.8
Democratic	John C. Homme	5,456	5.5
Republican	William McLean	5,446	5.5
Democratic	Allen B. Erickson	5,390	5.5
Republican	Richard Gormley	5,329	5.4
Republican	Wayne Colyar	4,693	4.7
Total votes		98,853	100
