= History of North Dakota =

North Dakota was first settled by Native Americans several thousand years ago. The first Europeans explored the area in the 18th century establishing some limited trade with the natives.

Much of the area was first organized by the United States as part of the Minnesota Territory and then the Dakota Territory in the 19th century. North Dakota gained statehood in 1889.

The railroads became the engine of settlement growth in the state. North Dakota's economy, has since its early days, has been heavily based on the production of agricultural products such as wheat, flaxseed, and cattle. Through other emerging economic sectors within the state and a decline of the farming industry due to agricultural mechanization, the state has seen population declines in formerly heavy farming areas.

== Early history of North Dakota ==
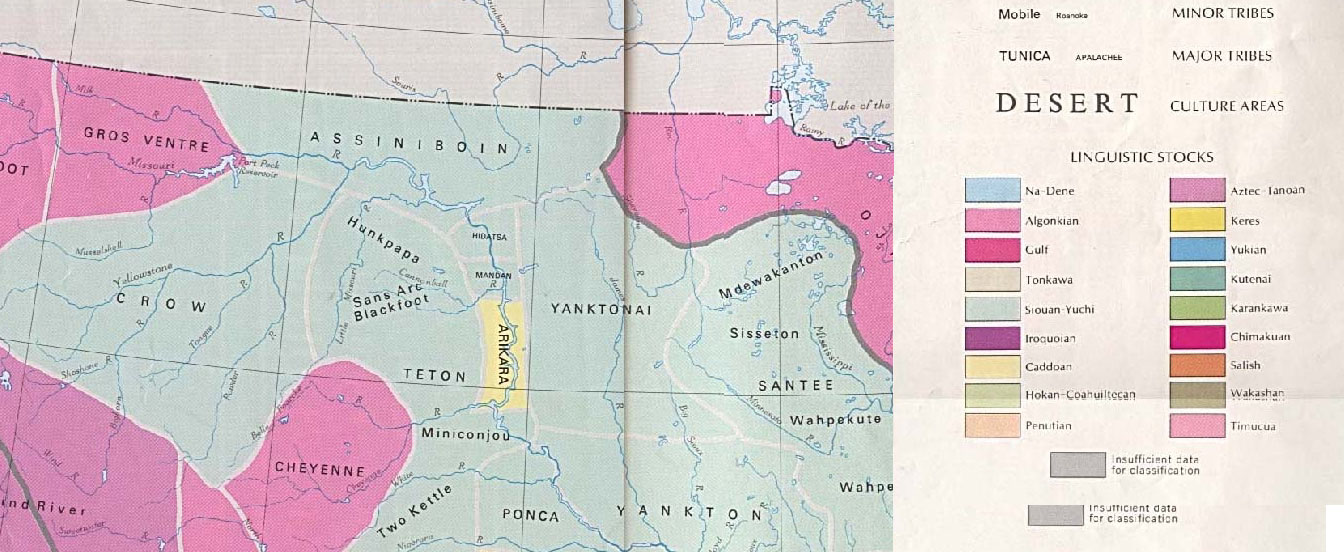
Indian Tribes in the region

North Dakota was first settled by Native Americans several thousand years ago. The major tribes in the area by the time of settlement were the Mandan, Hidatsa, Arikara, Sioux, and Chippewa.

These tribes used at least 349 kinds of plants for food, medicine, dyes, and rope. By the time European trade goods were making their way through native trade routes, the Mandan had developed an agricultural and trading society.

La Vérendrye was the first European to explore the area. He visited the Mandan tribes around 1738 and was astounded by their level of development. Limited trade with European powers followed through the end of the century.

The Mandan villages played a key role in the native trade networks because of their location and permanency. Their location at the northernmost reaches of the Missouri River placed them near the closest portages to the Hudson Bay basin and thus the fastest access to European traders. Additionally, valuable Knife River flint was produced not far from the villages.

During the 19th century, a number of Indians entered into treaties with the United States. Many of the treaties defined the territory of the different tribes in North Dakota.

== Late 19th century ==
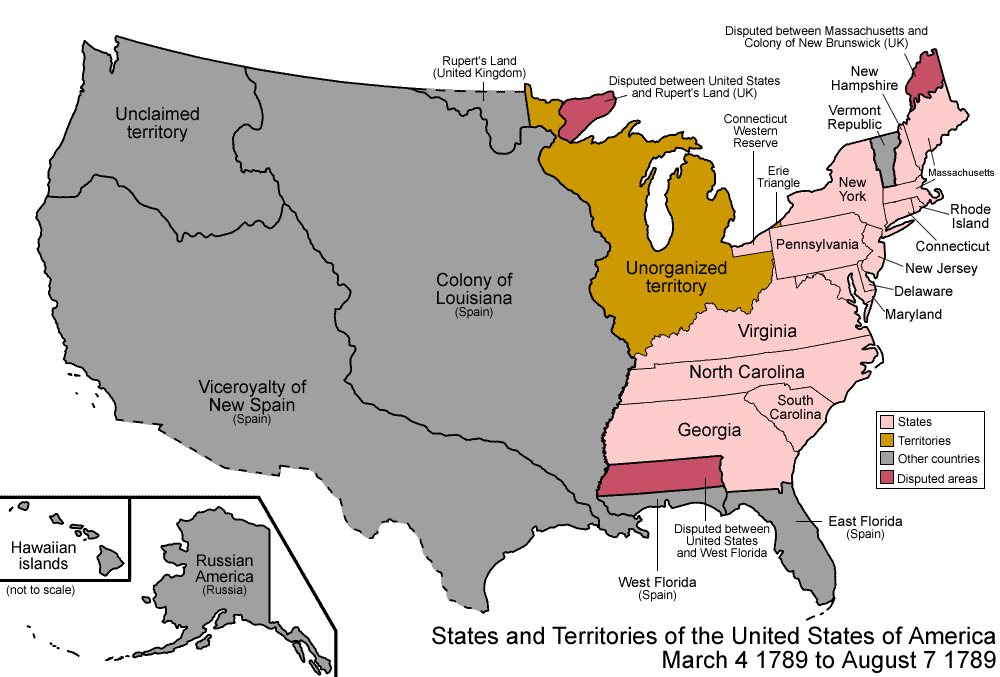
1789: Louisiana and Rupert's Land

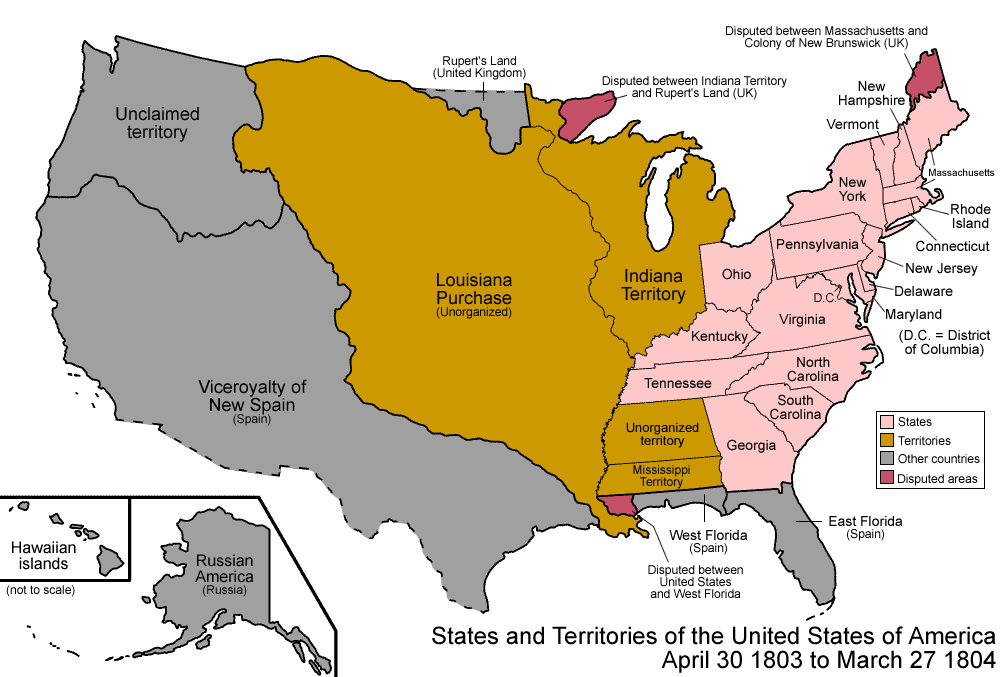
1803: US buys Louisiana

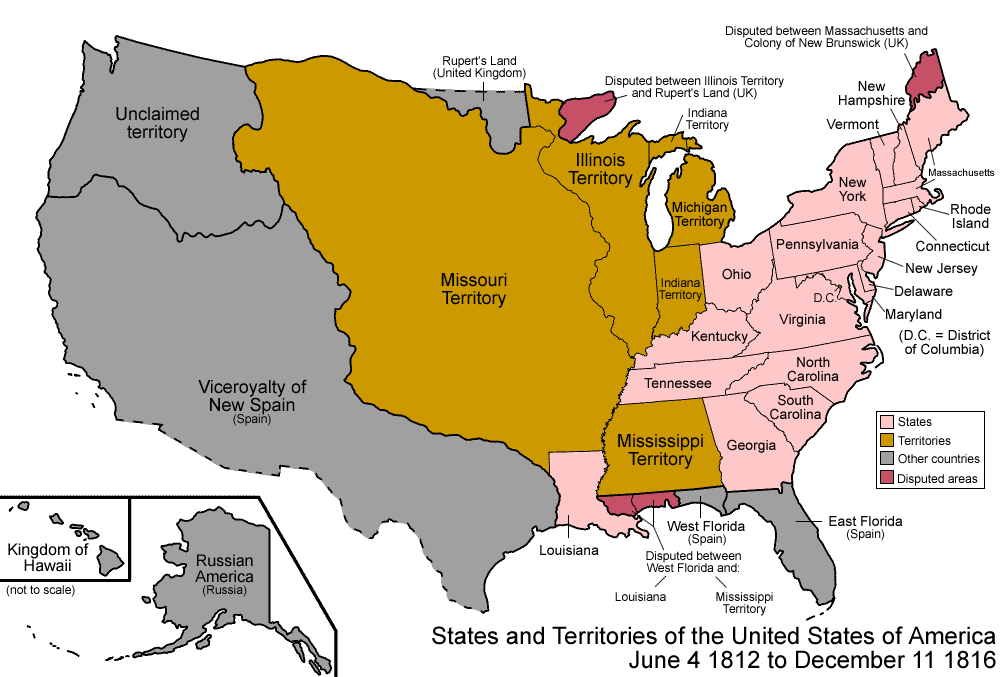
1812: Louisiana Territory renamed Missouri Territory

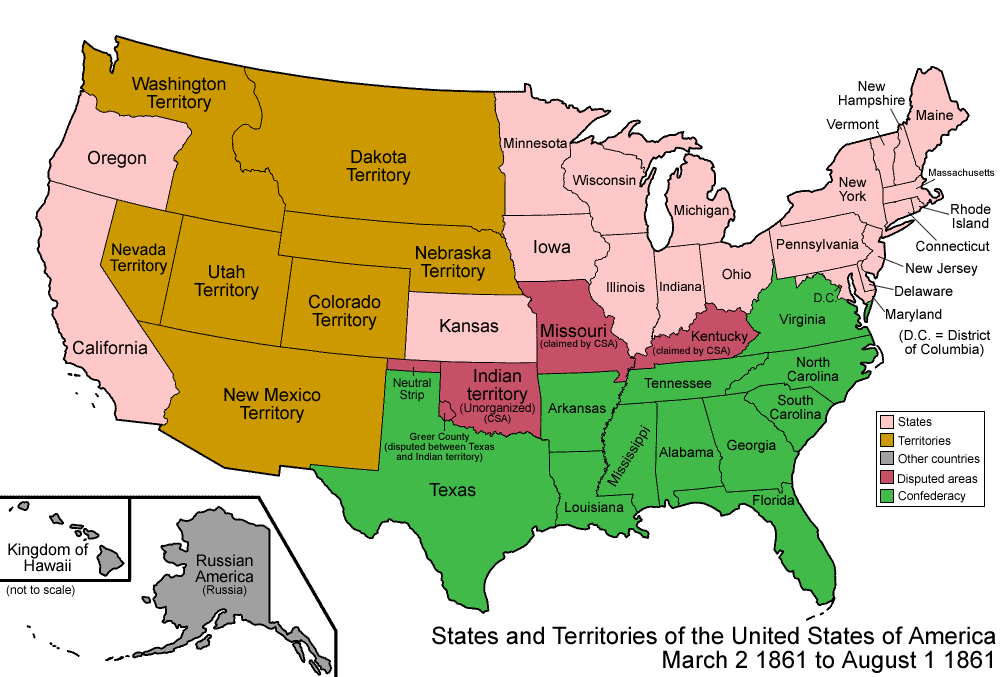
1861: Dakota Territory formed

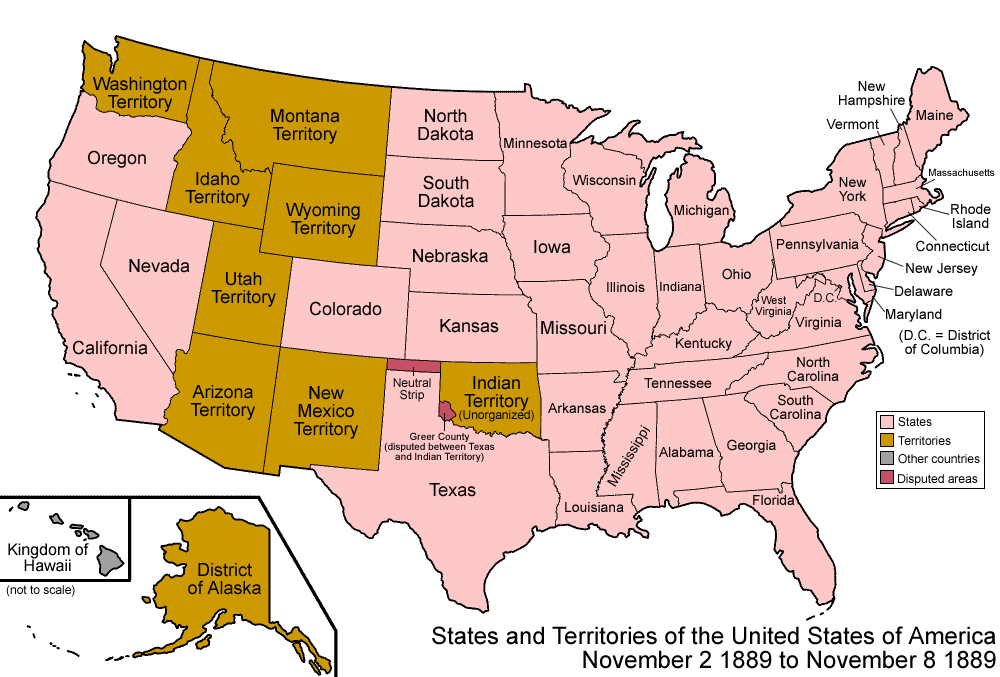
1889: North Dakotan statehood

=== Settlers ===
In 1861, the area that is now North Dakota was incorporated into the new Dakota Territory along with what is now South Dakota. Following 1862 Homestead Act, railroad expansion, and favorable environmental conditions, the Dakota Boom of the 1870s and '80s increased the Dakota Territory’s population from 11,766 in 1870 to over 328,000 by 1890, with the number farms growing from 1,700 to more than 50,000 and towns increasing from six to 310. The rapid population growth and development brought about by the Dakota Boom paved the way for North Dakota and South Dakota’s admission to the union as separate states on November 2, 1889.

Eager to attract settlers, state officials broadcast widely pamphlets and newspaper accounts celebrating the "Myth of North Dakota." This myth included: 1) the myth of the garden; 2) the "work and win" philosophy that promise to the realization of the American Dream of home ownership through hard work; and 3) an image of an empire in the making, settled by good and just people. The settlers came by 1910, with the largest numbers comprising German Americans, Scandinavian Americans, and Americans from the East Coast colloquially known as Yankees; the Yankees concentrated in the towns and cities, while the others became wheat farmers.

=== Railroads ===
The success of the Northern Pacific Railroad and the Great Northern Railroad was based on the abundant crops and rapidly increasing settlement in the Red River Valley along the Minnesota border between 1871 and 1890. The initial role of the railroads in opening this area was to commercial agriculture, the relation of James B. Power to "bonanza" farming, the tremendous immigration to this valley between 1878 and 1884, and the extensive efforts of Power and James J. Hill to promote agricultural diversification constitute an important chapter in railroad colonization history.

The railroad was the engine of settlement for the state. Major development occurred in the 1870s and 1880s. The Northern Pacific Railroad was given land grants by the federal government so that it could borrow money to build its system. The federal government kept every other section of land, and gave it away to homesteaders. At first the railroad sold much of its holdings at low prices to land speculators in order to realize quick cash profits, and also to eliminate sizable annual tax bills. By 1905 the railroad company land policies changes when it realized it had been a costly mistake to have sold much of the land at wholesale prices. With better railroad service and improved methods of farming the Northern Pacific easily sold what had been heretofore "worthless" land directly to farmers at very good prices. By 1910 the railroad's holdings in North Dakota had been greatly reduced. Meanwhile, the Great Northern Railroad energetically promoted settlement along its lines in the northern part of the state. The Great Northern bought its lands from the federal government—it received no land grants—and resold them to farmers one by one. It operated agencies in Germany and Scandinavia that promoted its lands, and brought families over at low cost. The battle between James J. Hill's Great Northern Railway and Edward Pennington's 'Soo Line Railroad' to control access across northern North Dakota resulted in nearly 500 miles of new track and more than 50 new town sites in one year. Many of the town sites were never settled, and were abandoned.

=== Germans from Russia ===
Germans from Russia were the most traditional of German-speaking arrivals. They were Germans who had lived for generations throughout the Russian Empire, but especially along the Volga River in Russia. Their ancestors had been invited to Russia in the 1760s to introduce more advanced German agriculture methods to rural Russia. They retained their religion, culture and language, but the Russian monarchy gradually eroded the relative autonomy they had been promised. Many found it necessary to emigrate to avoid conscription and preserve their culture. About 100,000 immigrated by 1900–1950, settling primarily in North and South Dakota, Kansas and Nebraska. The south-central part of North Dakota became known as "the German-Russian triangle".

These immigrants saw themselves a downtrodden ethnic group having an entirely different experience from the German Americans who had immigrated from Germany; they settled in tight-knit communities that retained their German language and culture. They raised large families, built German-style churches, buried their dead in distinctive cemeteries using cast iron grave markers, and created choir groups that sang German church hymns. Many farmers specialized in sugar beets — still a major crop in the upper Great Plains. During World War I their identity was challenged by anti-German sentiment. By the end of the World War II, the German language, which had always been used with English for public and official matters, was in serious decline. Today their descendants speak English and German persists mainly in singing groups. Despite the loss of their language, the ethnic group remains distinct and has left a lasting impression on the American West.

=== Regional tensions ===
Tensions between the northern and southern parts of the territory were present since the beginning. The more populated southern part regarded the northern as somewhat disreputable, "too much controlled by the wild folks, cattle ranchers, fur traders” and too frequently the site of conflict with the indigenous population. Also, the railroads connected the two parts to separate hubs, the northern part became connected to Minneapolis–Saint Paul, while the southern part became more connected to Sioux City, Iowa. In addition, while the southern part resented the territorial legislators appointed by the federal government, the northern part generally favored remaining a territory, arguing it was cheaper, with the federal government funding a wide range of state functions. The territorial capital's relocation from Yankton in the south at the Nebraska state line to Bismarck in the north in 1883 proved to be the last straw, and mainly the southern part began to call for division of the territory, some calling for southern part to be admitted as a state and the northern part to remain a territory. Eventually, at the 1887 territorial election, the voters agreed to split the territory.

== 20th century ==
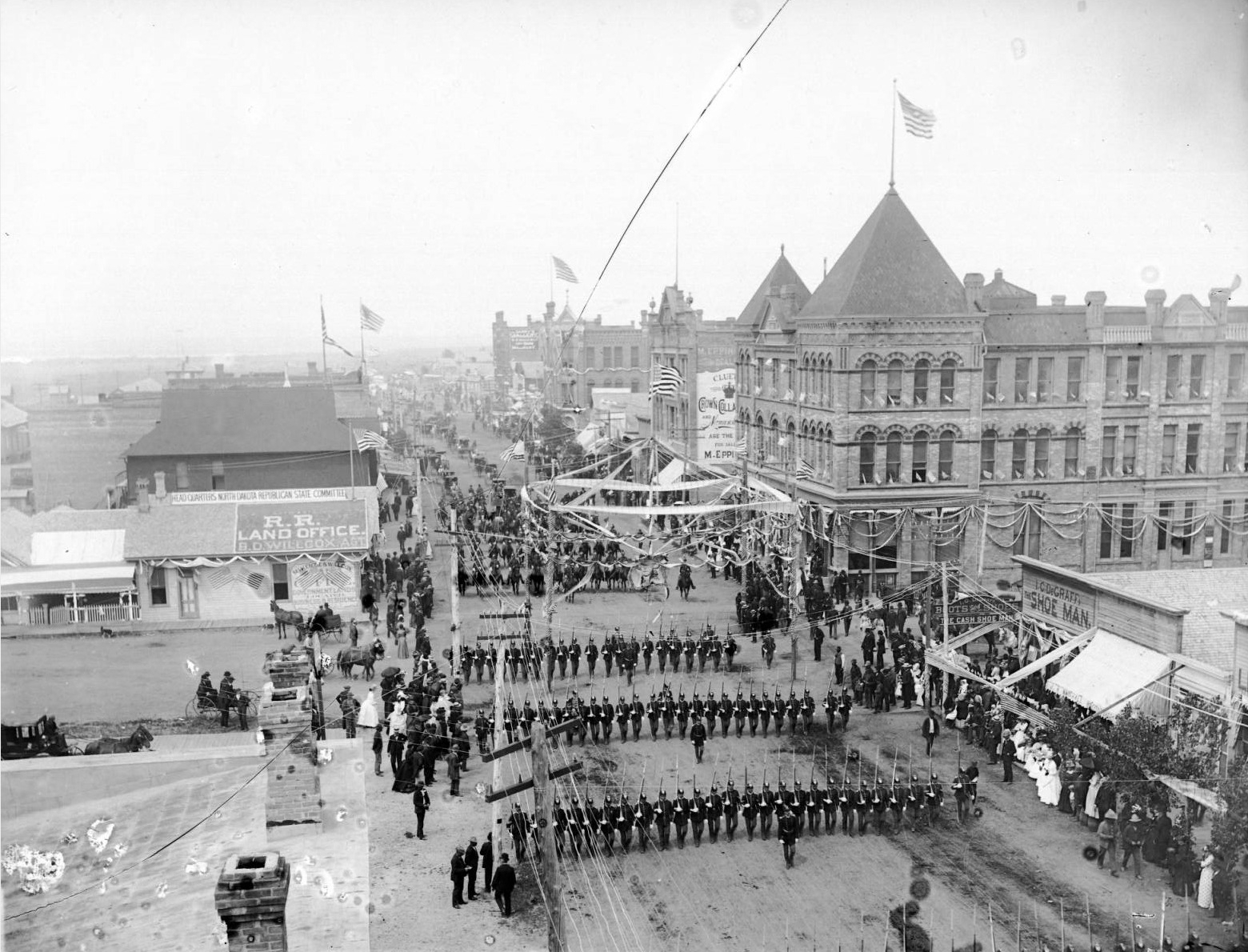
Parade at the 1889 Constitutional Convention held in Bismarck.

On May 14, 1889, the Constitutional Convention was held in Bismarck where the Dakota Territory was admitted into the Union as two states.

Many entrepreneurs built stores, shops, and offices along Main Street. The most handsome ones used pre-formed, sheet iron facades, especially those manufactured by the Mesker Brothers of St. Louis. These neoclassical, stylized facades added sophistication to brick or wood-frame buildings throughout the state.

=== Retail stores ===
In the rural areas farmers and ranchers depended on small local general stores that had a limited stock and slow turnover; they could make enough profit to stay in operation only by selling at high prices. Prices were not marked on each item; instead the customer negotiated a price. Men did most of the shopping, since the main criterion was credit rather than quality of goods. Indeed, most customers shopped on credit, paying off the bill when crops or cattle were later sold; the owner's ability to judge credit worthiness was vital to his success.

In the cities consumers had much more choice, and bought their dry goods and supplies at locally owned department stores. They had a much wider selection of goods than in the country general stores, and provided tags that gave the actual selling price. In an era before credit cards, the department stores provided limited credit to selected customers; everyone else paid cash. They set up attractive displays and, after 1900, window displays as well. Their clerks were experienced salesmen whose knowledge of the products appealed to the better educated middle-class housewives who did most of the shopping. The keys to success were a large variety of high-quality brand-name merchandise, high turnover, reasonable prices, and frequent special sales. The larger stores sent their buyers to Denver, Minneapolis, and Chicago once or twice a year to evaluate the newest trends in merchandising and stock up on the latest fashions. By the 1920s and 1930s, large mail-order houses such as Sears, Roebuck & Co. and Montgomery Ward provided serious competition, so the department stores relied even more on salesmanship, and close integration with the community.

=== Politics ===
From the late 19th century, North Dakota's politics was generally dominated by the Republican Party. The Populist movement made little headway among the ethnic farmers. A representative leader was John Miller (1853–1908). Born in New York of Scottish ancestry, he came to North Dakota during the bonanza farm period, 1878–89. A Republican, he entered politics and was elected as the state's first governor, serving two years, after which he devoted his time to farm management. The greatest victory he won as governor was the defeat of a charter for a state lottery. He returned to his bonanza farm business and organized the John Miller Land Company in 1896. Miller became president of the newly incorporated Chaffee-Miller Milling Company in 1906. He was interested in numerous projects for civic and social improvement until his death in 1908.

Republican Senator Asle Gronna was reflected the attitudes of his region – progressive and isolationist. He blamed munition makers for the preparedness movement and World War I and was part of the "little group of willful men," so labeled by President Woodrow Wilson. In 1919, he was a staunch isolationist who opposed the League of Nations treaty because it further entangled the United States in foreign relationships and limited national decision making. Gronna failed to win reelection in 1920.

=== Langer and the NPL ===
The Non-Partisan League (NPL) was initially a faction of the Republican Party which ran farmers as candidates in the Republican primaries. Formed in 1915 with its roots in agrarian populism, it was strongest in the north-central and northwestern areas of the state, where Norwegian Americans predominated. The NPL advocated state control to counter the power of the railroads, the banks and the cities. Some of its programs remain in place to this day, notably a state-owned bank and state-owned mill and grain elevator. Conservatives, based in the towns and cities, fought back, and Republican primaries were the scene of intense political battles.

In 1916, Lynn Frazier led the Nonpartisan League in a left-wing populist movement that gained control of North Dakota's lower house and won 79% of the popular vote in North Dakota's gubernatorial election of 1916. Campaigning as Republicans against Democrats supported by intellectuals and liberal reformers espousing collectivist and corporate farming, the NPL gained a large share of the rural and agrarian vote. It also elected John Miller Baer to the United States House of Representatives. In the 1918 elections, the NPL won control of both houses of the legislature, and afterwards enacted a significant portion of its populist platform. It established state-run enterprises such as a railroad, the North Dakota Mill and Elevator, and the Bank of North Dakota. The NPL also set up a Home Building Association, to aid people in financing and building houses. The legislature passed a graduated state income tax, distinguishing between earned and unearned income; authorized a state hail insurance fund, and established a workmen's compensation fund that assessed employers. In addition, the device of popular recall of elected officials was enacted whereby the first governor in U.S. history to be recalled was to be Frazier during his third term. The populist movement embodied by it extended into Canada in the form of the Alberta Non-Partisan League.

William Langer (1886–1959) in 1916 was elected state attorney general on the NPL ticket, one of the few urban men in the farm group. Langer closed brothels in Minot, became a federal marshal to raid a Minnesota brewery, and enforced school attendance laws. He turned the NPL into a political machine. Elected governor at the nadir of the Great Depression in 1932, Langer declared a debt moratorium, stopped foreclosures, and raised the price of wheat paid by the state-owned grain elevator to the state's wheat farmers. He also solicited 5% of each state employee's salary for an NPL newspaper, which led to federal conspiracy charges, an initial criminal conviction, and his removal from office in 1934. He was later acquitted and was reelected governor in 1936. Langer moved to the US Senate in 1940, where he served until 1959. Despite his overt political opportunism and rumors about his taking bribes, Langer's interventions during the depression overshadowed any charges of corruption in the minds of voters.

=== After 1945 ===
==== Isolationism ====
In the 1940s and 1950s, the state's Congressional delegation comprised Senators William Langer and Milton R. Young and Representatives William Lemke and Usher Lloyd Burdick. In foreign policy they formed an isolationist bloc that opposed American involvement in the Cold War, and opposed the United Nations, the Truman Doctrine, Marshall Plan, the North Atlantic Treaty Organization, the Korean War, the Southeast Asian Treaty Organization, the Formosa Resolution, and the Eisenhower Doctrine of 1957. They reflected the isolationist spirit that dominated the German American element in the state, and was likewise strong among Scandinavian Americans. Burdick's isolationism reflected his deep fears of communism and world government and, in turn, the threat they could pose to the sovereignty of the United States. Many of his constituents saw global entanglements, particularly war, as obvious dangers to the state's agricultural economy and lifestyle. His sharpest criticisms came in the wake of the outbreak of war in Korea. Burdick is remembered best for his independent voting behavior, his advocacy for the downtrodden, and his leadership in building a rhetoric of opposition to the UN in the United States.

==== NPL merges with Democratic Party ====
By the 1950s, the NPL had changed from a political alternative to a facet of North Dakota's political establishment. A group of young insurgents in 1956 merged the NPL into the Democratic Party. While the governorship of the state has been held approximately the same amount of time by both parties since the Democratic-NPL party was formed in 1956, the state legislature has been dominated by Republicans.

==== Farming ====
North Dakota has long been the most agricultural state in the Union. Farms have increased in acreage and decreased in number. Tenancy is diminishing as technological advances are made, and more fertilizer is being used. Cash grains are being replaced by feed grains and roughage, and because of the soil bank and wheat acreage allotments, over 30 percent of the crop land is not harvested. The farm standard of living is high as the farm population decreases. Schools and churches are reduced in number by consolidation and merger.

== 21st century ==
Since 2000, the state has experienced rapid growth, largely due to the oil boom in western North Dakota's oil-rich Bakken shale. A 2013 census report listed North Dakota's population at an all-time high of 723,393 residents, making North Dakota the fastest growing state in the nation. The population boom reverses nearly a century of flat population numbers.

The profile of the newcomers shows that compared to long-term residents, they generally are younger (60% were between 21 and 40 years old) and better educated (45% were college graduates and another 35% reported some college or postsecondary vocational-technical school experience). The migrants were motivated more by quality of life values than economic incentives; reasons for moving most often cited were desire for a safer place to live (58%), desire to be closer to relatives (54%), lower cost of living (48%), and quality of the natural environment (47%). These residents represent a productive cohort of people who were needed to augment population strata that were severely depleted by the out-migration of the 1980s.

== Themes in North Dakota History ==
In his History of North Dakota, historian Elwyn B. Robinson identified themes in North Dakota history:

- Dependence
- Radicalism
- Economic disadvantage
- The "too-much mistake"
- Adjustment

Robinson's history is to date the only comprehensive history of the state, but his analysis has drawn fire. His assertion of a "too-much mistake" in particular, is controversial. By this Robinson meant that North Dakota had too many farms, railroad miles, roads, towns, banks, schools, government institutions, churches, and people for suitable living in a subhumid grassland. Either the state will revert to a natural grassland, have a future similar to its past, or come to grips with the "too-much-mistake" and rationally control government and the advantages of new technology. Some politicians, including Joe Satrom, blame the book for (un)inspiring a generation of leaders to lower their expectations for the state's future.

The land of North Dakota has been a central theme in North Dakotan literature. In fiction, poetry, autobiography, drama, history, travel publications and websites, recurring theme regarding North Dakota's land include: its beauty, unforgivingness, solace, starkness, uniformity, and the hard work it demands to survive and thrive. Many of the state's writers focus on the relationship of the people and the land. The landscape has not significantly changed since first impressions were recorded, and the relationship between people and land has likewise changed little.

== See also ==
- Bibliography of North Dakota history
- Founding dates of North Dakota incorporated cities
- List of historical societies in North Dakota
- Germans from Russia, many of whom lived in North Dakota
- History of the Midwestern United States
- Territorial evolution of North Dakota
- Women's suffrage in North Dakota

== Bibliography ==
- Anderson, Kathie Ryckman. Dakota: The Literary Heritage of the Northern Prairie State. (1990), quick glance at 200 authors
- Arends, Shirley Fischer. The Central Dakota Germans: Their History, Language, and Culture. (1989). 289 pp.; the state's largest ethnic group.
- Benton, Alva H. "Large land holdings in North Dakota." Journal of Land & Public Utility Economics 1.4 (1925): 405–413. online
- Berg, Francie M., ed. Ethnic Heritage in North Dakota. (1983). 174 pp.
- Blackorby, Edward C. Prairie Rebel: The Public Life of William Lemke (1963), radical leader in 1930s
- Bochert, John R. America's Northern Heartland (1987), regional geography
- Caldwell, W. Logan. "Constitutional Law-The History of the Initiated Measure in North Dakota: Removing the People's Power or Watching for the Wolf in Sheep's Clothing?." North Dakota Law Review 97 (2022): 217+ online.
- Collins, Michael L. That Damned Cowboy: Theodore Roosevelt and the American West, 1883-1898 (1989). Teddy was a rancher here in the 1880s
- Cooper, Jerry and Smith, Glen. Citizens as Soldiers: A History of the North Dakota National Guard. (1986). 447 pp. online
- Crawford, Lewis F. History of North Dakota (3 vol 1931), history in vol 1; biographies in vol. 2–3
- Danbom, David B. "Our Purpose Is to Serve": The First Century of the North Dakota Agricultural Experiment Station. (1990). 237 pp.
- Danbom, David B. "North Dakota: The Most Midwestern State," in Heartland: Comparative Histories of the Midwestern States, ed. by James H. Madison, (1988) pp 107–126
- Drache, Hiram M. The Day of the Bonanza: A History of Bonanza Farming in the Red River Valley of the North. (1964), giant wheat farms with many employees
- Eisenberg, C. G. History of the First Dakota-District of the Evangelical-Lutheran Synod of Iowa and Other States. (1982). 268 pp. now part of ELCA
- Ginsburg, Faye D. Contested Lives: The Abortion Debate in an American Community. (1989). 315 pp. the issue in Fargo
- Goodman, L. R. and R. J. Eidem. The Atlas of North Dakota (1976), 105 maps illuminate ethnic, social, and economic life from settlement to the present.
- Hampsten, Elizabeth. Settlers' Children: Growing Up on the Great Plains (1991)
- Hampsten, Elizabeth. "Writing Women's History in North Dakota," North Dakota History, 1996, Vol. 63 Issue 2, pp 2–6
- Hargreaves, Mary W. M. Dry Farming in the Northern Great Plains: Years of Readjustment, 1920-1990. (1993). 386 pp.
- Hedges, James B. "The Colonization Work of the Northern Pacific Railroad," Mississippi Valley Historical Review Vol. 13, No. 3 (Dec., 1926), pp. 311–342 in JSTOR
- Herz, Clarence Anthony. "A History of North Dakota’s Petroleum Industry, 1917–2017" (Diss. North Dakota State University, 2022) online.
- Howard, Thomas W., ed. The North Dakota Political Tradition. (1981). 220 pp.; essays on Alexander McKenzie, Governor John Burke, Senator William Langer, Governor Fred G. Aandahl, Elizabeth Preston Anderson, NPL and the Independent Voters' Association.
- Hudson, John C. Plains Country Towns. (1985). 189 pp. geographer studies small towns
- Junker, Rozanne Enerson. The Bank of North Dakota: An Experiment in State Ownership. (1989). 185 pp.
- Lamar, Howard R. Dakota Territory, 1861-1889: A Study of Frontier Politics (1956).
- Lounsberry, Clement A. Early history of North Dakota, (1919) an excellent history by the editor of the Bismarck Tribune; 645pp online edition
- Lysengen, Janet Daley and Rathke, Ann M., eds. The Centennial Anthology of "North Dakota History: Journal of the Northern Plains." (1996). 526 pp. articles from state history journal covering all major topics in the state's history
- Mills, David W. Cold War in a Cold Land: Fighting Communism on the Northern Plains (2015) Col War era; excerpt
- Morlan, Robert L. Political Prairie Fire: The Nonpartisan League, 1915-1922. (1955). 414 pp. radical-left NPL came to power briefly
- Murray, Stanley Norman. The Valley Comes of Age: A History of Agriculture in the Valley of the Red River of the North, 1812-1920 (1967)
- Peirce, Neal R. The Great Plains States of America: People, Politics, and Power in the Nine Great Plains States (1973) excerpt and text search, chapter on North Dakota
- Robinson, Elwyn B. "The Themes of North Dakota History," North Dakota History (Winter 1959), online
- Robinson, Elwyn B., D. Jerome Tweton, and David B. Danbom. History of North Dakota (2nd ed. 1995) standard history, by leading scholars; extensive bibliography
  - Robinson, Elwyn B. History of North Dakota (1966, 1995 reprint) online see also History of North Dakota (book)
- Schneider, Mary Jane. North Dakota Indians: An Introduction. (1986). 276 pp.
- Sherman, William C. and Playford V. Thorson, eds. Plains Folk: North Dakota's Ethnic History. (1988). 419 pp.
- Sherman, William C. Prairie Mosaic: An Ethnic Atlas of Rural North Dakota. (1983). 152 pp.
- Smith, Glen H. Langer of North Dakota: A Study in Isolationism, 1940-1959. (1979). 238 pp. biography of influential conservative Senator
- Snortland, J. Signe, ed. A Traveler's Companion to North Dakota State Historic Sites. (1996). 155 pp.
- Stock, Catherine McNicol. Main Street in Crisis: The Great Depression and the Old Middle Class on the Northern Plains. (1992). 305pp online
- Stradley, Scot A. The Broken Circle: An Economic History of North Dakota (1993)
- Tauxe, Caroline S. Farms, Mines and Main Streets: Uneven Development in a Dakota County. (1993). 276 pp. coal and grain in Mercer county
- Tufte, Jerod. "The North Dakota Constitution: An Original Approach Since 1889." North Dakota Law Review 95 (2020): 417+ online.
- Tweton, D. Jerome, and Daniel F. Rylance. The Years of Despair: North Dakota in the Depression. (1973) politics of the 1920s
- Tweton, D. Jerome and Jelliff, Theodore B. North Dakota: The Heritage of a People. (1976). 242 pp. basic textbook online
- Wilkins, Robert P. and Wilkins, Wynona Hutchette. North Dakota: A Bicentennial History. (1977) 218 pp. popular history online
- Wishart, David J. Encyclopedia of the Great Plains (2004), many articles by scholars on many topics online

=== Primary sources ===
- Benson, Bjorn; Hampsten, Elizabeth; and Sweney, Kathryn, eds. Day In, Day Out: Women's Lives in North Dakota. (1988). 326 pp.
- Johan Bojer, The Emigrants (1925) ISBN 0-8032-6051-2
- Maximilian, Prince of Wied. Travels in the Interior of North America in the rears 1832 to 1834 (Vols. XXII-XXIV of "Early Western Travels, 1748-1846," ed. by Reuben Gold Thwaites; 1905–1906). Maximilian spent the winter of 1833–1834 at Fort Clark.
- Meek, Martha, and Jay Meek, eds. Prairie Volcano: An Anthology of North Dakota Writing. (1995), short works by 50 recent authors
- Raaen, Aagot. Grass of the Earth (1950) true, highly revealing story of one Norwegian family in the 1880s
- University of North Dakota, Bureau of Governmental Affairs, ed., A Compilation of North Dakota Political Party Platforms, 1884-1978. (1979). 388 pp.
- Wishart, David J. ed. Encyclopedia of the Great Plains, University of Nebraska Press, 2004, ISBN 0-8032-4787-7. complete text online; 900 pages of scholarly articles
- Woiwode, Larry. Beyond the Bedroom Wall: A Family Album (1975) novel about growing up in N.D.
- WPA. North Dakota: A Guide to the Northern Prairie State (2nd ed. 1950), the classic guide
- Young, Carrie. Prairie Cooks: Glorified Rice, Three-Day Buns, and Other Reminiscences. (1993). 136 pp.
