= Airboat =

Type of watercraft propelled by an aircraft propeller

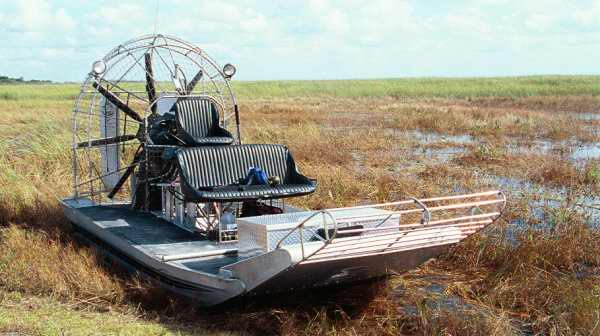
An airboat

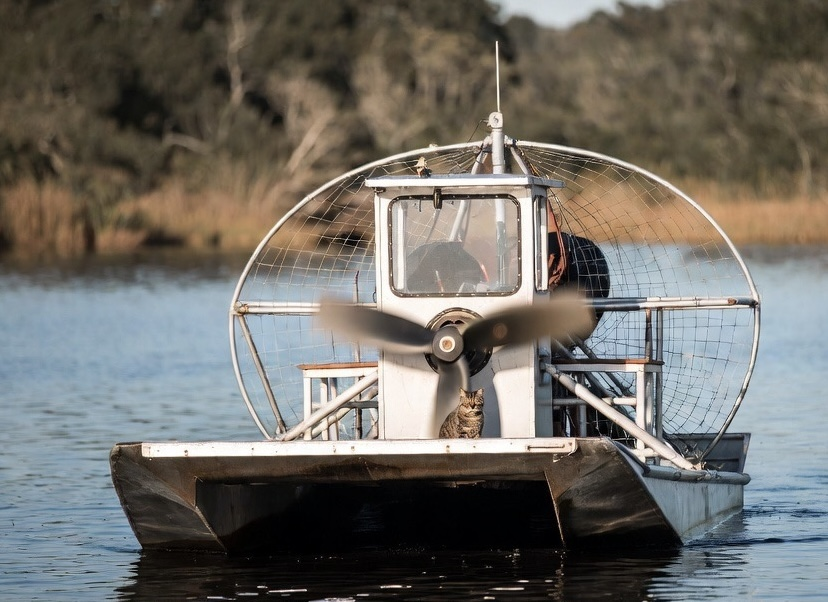
Cat on airboat

An airboat (also known as a bayou boat, fanboat, planeboat, or swamp boat) is a flat-bottomed watercraft propelled by an aircraft-type propeller and powered by either an aircraft or automotive engine. (Note: In early aviation history the term airboat was applied to seaplanes or flying boats, i.e. aircraft capable of taking off and landing on water surfaces. Early airboats were known as "hydroglisseurs" (airboat in French, lit. "water slider"), hydroplanes, hydrofoils, or other names.) It is commonly used for fishing, hunting, recreation, and ecotourism.

Airboats are a common means of transportation in marshy or shallow areas where a standard inboard or outboard engine with a submerged propeller would be impractical, most notably in the Florida Everglades but also in the Kissimmee and St. Johns rivers, and the Mekong River and Delta, as well as the Louisiana bayous and Mesopotamian Marshes.

== Overview ==
The airboat’s characteristic flat-bottom allows for easy navigation through marshes and other shallow bodies of water, including flooded areas. A version is also adapted for use on ice.

The lack of operating parts below the waterline makes the craft ideal for rescue operations.

The airboat is propelled by a column of air generated by a propeller, with wind speed generated up to 150 miles per hour (241 km/h). Rudders attached to a control stick divert the air to steer.

Airboats generally travel at speeds of around 35 miles per hour (30 kn; 55 km/h); modified craft can reach 135 miles per hour (115 kn; 215 km/h).

Without special adaptations, airboats cannot go in reverse. Slowing and stopping an airboat is more difficult than a normal watercraft because it rides on top of rather than in the water.

The operator's seat is typically in an elevated position to maximize visibility.

In the United States, a typical good-quality airboat in 2004 cost between $33,000 and $70,000. In a developing country like Iraq, however, an airboat may be purchased for as little as 2.5 million Iraqi dinars, or $2,147.

Because of their specialized design and limited mobility beyond the conditions they are designed for, airboats represent a small fraction of total watercraft. As of December 2017 there were 12,164 airboats, 1,025 of which were commercial, in the state of Florida. Airboats are widely used in other Gulf Coast states, especially Louisiana.

=== Soviet airboats and aerosleds ===
Airboats and airboat-like craft have been used in the Soviet Union and its successor states since the Second World War and possibly earlier. Some true airboats—vessels that operated entirely in the water—were used by the Soviet military in World War II. These true airboats include the NKL-5, a 1,200-kilogram (2,600 lb) WWII armed boat reportedly capable of speeds up to 60 kilometres per hour (37 mph; 32 kn). However, most Soviet airboats are aerosleds (referred to as "aerosanis" in Russian). An aerosled is an aircraft propeller driven amphibious vehicle best described as a hybrid of a sled, airboat, and ground effect vehicle. Thousands of aerosleds were used as cargo and passenger vehicles in Siberia, where they cope excellently, working equally well in the icy Siberian winter and in muddy, marshy conditions of the Rasputitsa season (similar to the American mud season), when meltwater and thawing snow makes travel by road impossible. Aerosleds are still in use today. The Tupolev A-3 Aerosledge is a quintessential example of this type of vehicle; it can reach speeds of up to 120 km/h (75 mph) on snow and 65 km/h (40 mph) on water.

== History ==
The airboat was invented in 1905 in Nova Scotia, Canada, by Alexander Graham Bell. It first saw military use in 1915, by the British Army in the World War I Mesopotamian Campaign. Expanded civilian use appeared in the 1930s.

=== Prototypes ===
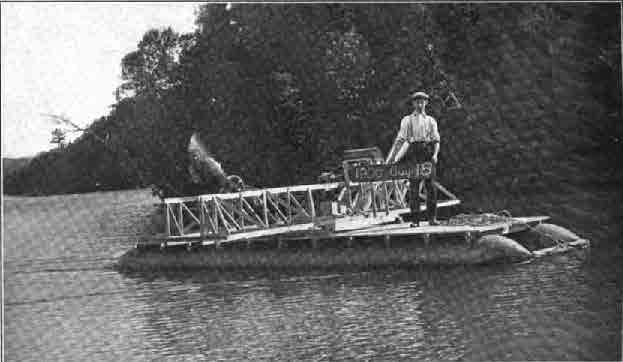
Alexander Graham Bell with his aircraft engine test boat/airboat, the Ugly Duckling

The earliest ancestors of the airboat were waterborne vehicles for testing aircraft engines. The first airboat was the Ugly Duckling, an aircraft propeller testing vehicle built in 1905 in Nova Scotia, Canada, by a team led by inventor Alexander Graham Bell. Ugly Duckling was a catamaran-type boat driven by an aircraft propeller hooked up to a water-cooled aircraft engine weighing 2,500 pounds (1,100 kg). The makeshift raft-like vessel was unable to move faster than 3.5 knots) (approximately 4 miles per hour), though its propeller rotation speed led Bell to believe that the vessel had a theoretical top speed of "thirty or forty miles an hour," comparable to some modern airboats, if drag was completely eliminated.

Brazilian aviation pioneer Alberto Santos-Dumont built a similar catamaran vessel for testing an aircraft engine in 1907, which he termed a hydrofoil.

The Tellier brothers, French aviation pioneers, made major steps towards modern airboats with their 1907 speedboat La Rapière II (Rapier II). La Rapière II was an 8-metre (26 ft) long mahogany speedboat powered by a partially above water aircraft propeller hooked up to a 20 hp 4 cylinder Panhard-Levassor engine. The boat was steered by a conventional rudder in the water, which was hooked up to a ship's wheel. La Rapière II could achieve speeds of up to 26 kilometres per hour (16 mph; 14 kn) with two people on board and 25 kilometres per hour (16 mph; 13 kn) with 3-4 people on board. French financier, balloonist, and aircraft enthusiast Jacques Schneider, of Schneider Trophy fame, developed and experimented with his own multi-passenger brand of airboat circa 1913–1914.

=== Early airboats ===
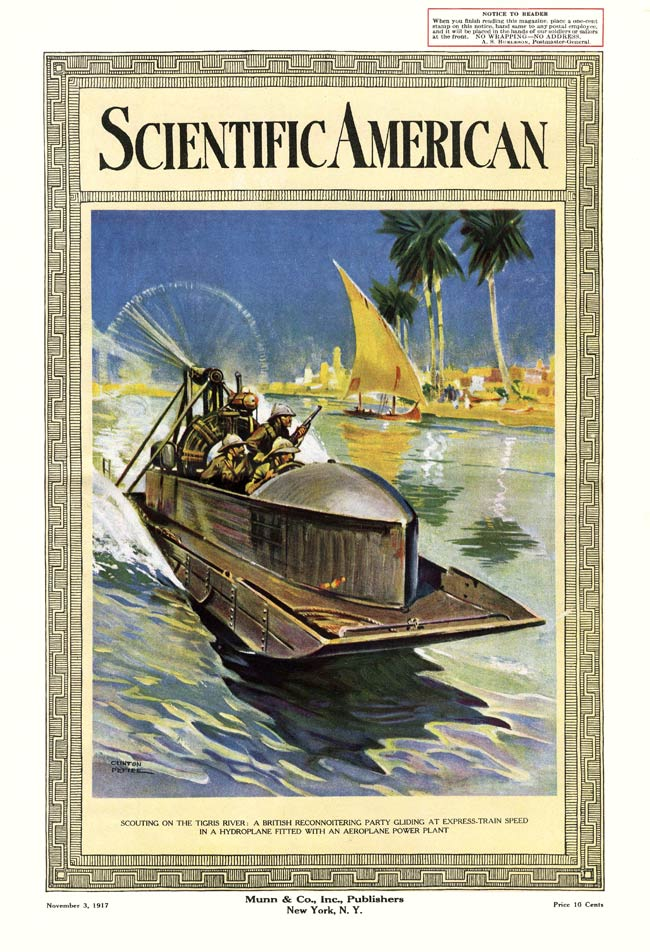
A 1917 Scientific American cover depicting a British Army airboat on the Tigris River during the World War I Mesopotamian Campaign.

The first airboats to see any real use date to 1915. The British Army used airboats, which they referred to as Lambert "Hydro-Glisseurs"," in the Mesopotamian Campaign of the First World War. These "Hydro-Glisseurs" were small, flat-bottomed hydroplanes with metal-clad wooden hulls propelled by a large aircraft fan that allowed them to reach speeds of up to 55 miles per hour (48 kn). They were primarily used for reconnaissance on the Tigris River. The first of these airboats, HG 1 Ariel, was constructed using the engine and propeller of a wrecked Royal Australian Air Force Farman MF.7 biplane and was provided to the forces in Mesopotamia by the British Raj. Following Ariel's successful deployment in the campaign upriver to Kut in 1915–1916, Britain ordered seven purpose-built airboats from Charles de Lambert's eponymous company De Lambert. Eight of these vessels were in operation in 1917, increasing to nine by the 1918 Armistice. A dedicated repair slipway for these boats was built at the Motor Repair Dockyard in Baghdad, indicating both their importance to the British war effort and the difficulty of maintaining them.

Following the war, Lambert airboats were used as ferries on the shallow waters of the upper Yangtze River, on the Huangpu River, and elsewhere. Like their military counterparts, these airboats were manufactured in France, though they were assembled in Shanghai. They had drafts of only seven inches and could cruise at up to 32 miles per hour (28 kn). Lambert airboats were also used widely on the upper Missouri River and on the marshes of the Florida Everglades.

Farman Aircraft, the company that built the engines for the WWI military airboats, began producing civilian airboats in the 1920s. It marketed airboats for use as water taxis and as light cargo vessels or patrol boats for French colonial governments. Its airboats sold for 25,000 to 50,000 francs depending on the model, a price that proved too steep for potential buyers; the company pulled out of the boat business by the end of the 1920s.

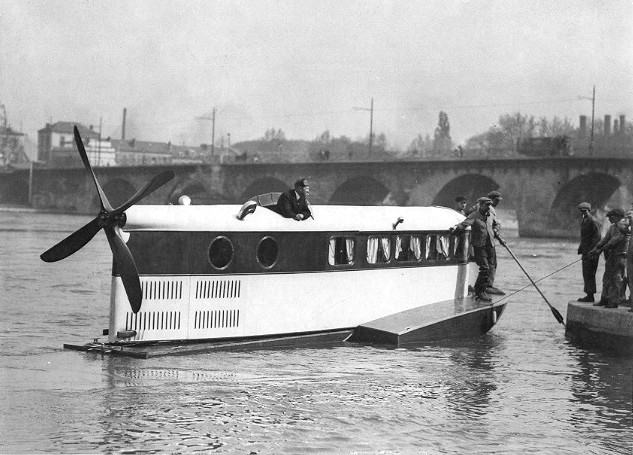
Farman airboat prototype Le Ricocheur in 1924. She was capable of speeds of up to 125 km/h (67.5 knots)

These early European airboats were significantly different from their modern counterparts. Compared to the airboats of today, early European airboats tended to be somewhat larger, had higher freeboards, and lacked a protective cage surrounding the propeller. They also had a different steering mechanism: early airboats were steered with a rudder in the water controlled by a steering wheel with throttle control provided by a gas pedal, like an automobile. More modern airboats use an air rudder controlled with a joystick for steering.

=== Early American airboats ===
Glenn Curtiss is credited with building a type of airboat in 1920 to help facilitate his hobby of bow and arrow hunting in the Florida backwoods. The millionaire, who later went on to develop the cities of Hialeah and Miami, combined his talents in the fields of aviation and design to facilitate his hobby, and the end result was Scooter, a 6-passenger, closed-cabin, propeller-driven boat powered by an aircraft engine that allowed it to slip through wetlands at 50 miles per hour (43 kn).

Airboats began to become popular in the United States in the 1930s, when they were independently invented and used by a number of Floridians, most living in or around the Everglades. Some Floridians who invented their own airboats include frog hunter Johnny Lamb, who built a 75-horsepower airboat in 1933 he called the "whooshmobile" and Chokoloskee Gladesmen Ernest and Willard Yates, who built an airboat in 1935 they steered via reins attached to a crude wooden rudder. Willard Yates holds the ignominious distinction of being the first person to die in an airboating accident, when the engine dislodged and sent the spinning propeller into him.

An improved airboat was invented in Utah in 1943 by Cecil Williams, Leo Young, and G. Hortin Jensen. Their boat, developed and used near Brigham City, Utah, is sometimes erroneously called the first airboat. At the Bear River Migratory Bird Refuge in northern Utah, Cecil S. Williams and G. Hortin Jensen sought a solution to the problem of conducting avian botulism studies in the shallow, marshy hinterlands. By installing a 40-horsepower Continental aircraft engine, purchased for $99.50, on a flat-bottomed 12-foot long aluminum boat, they built one of the first modern airboats. Their airboat had no seat, so the skipper was forced to kneel in the boat. They dubbed it the Alligator I as a response to a joking comment from US Fish and Wildlife Service headquarters that they should "get an alligator from Louisiana, saddle up and ride the critter during their botulism studies." Their airboat was the first to use an air rudder (a rudder directing the propeller exhaust rather than the water), a major improvement in modern airboat design.

The purpose of Williams, Young, and Jensen's airboat was to help preserve and protect bird populations and animal life at the world's largest migratory game bird refuge. The Bear River Migratory Bird Refuge near Brigham City, Utah, is a wetlands oasis amid the Great Basin Desert and an essential stopping point for birds migrating across North America. The need for a practical way to navigate a challenging environment of wetlands, shallow water, and thick mud helped inspire Williams, Young, and Jensen to create the flat-bottom airboat, which they initially called an "air thrust boat". Designs and subsequent improvements and practical use of the air thrust boats appear to have been a collaborative effort. LeeRue Allen, who worked at the Refuge since 1936, appears to have also been involved and helped to document a history of the events.

Many of the early airboats built at the refuge in Utah were shipped to Florida. Early records show it cost roughly $1,600 to build a boat, including the engine.

Over the years, the standard design evolved through trial-and-error: an open, flat bottom boat with an engine mounted on the back, the driver sitting in an elevated position, and a cage to protect the propeller from objects flying into them.

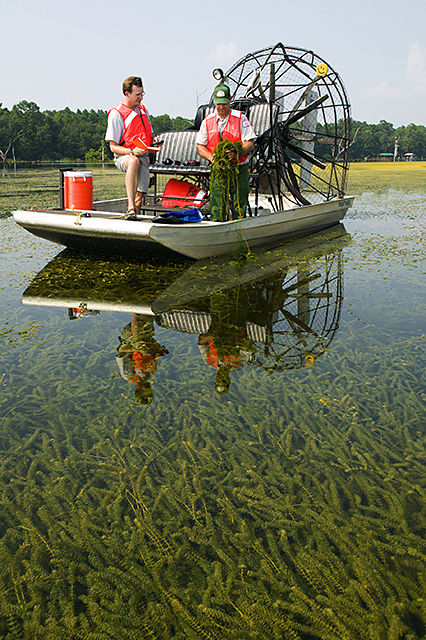
The US Army Corps of Engineers uses an airboat to collect herbicide-resistant hydrilla from Lake Seminole in northern Florida

== Manufacture and design ==
Airboat manufacturers tend to be small, family run businesses that assemble built-to-order boats. Most airboats are manufactured in the United States, although they are also built in Russia, Italy, Finland, Japan, Australia, and elsewhere. Prior to 1950, most airboats were manufactured in France by companies and individuals such as Farman, De Lambert, and René Couzinet.

Modern, commercially manufactured airboat hulls are made of aluminum or fiberglass. The material used ideally reflects by the type of terrain in which the vessel will be operated; airboats intended for use in icy conditions will have sturdier polymer coated aluminum hulls while some airboats intended for use in marshes will have lighter fiberglass hulls. Standard hunt/trail boats are 10 feet (3.0 m) long with a two- to three-passenger capacity. Tour boats can be much larger, accommodating 18 passengers or more.

Engines are either an air-cooled, 4- or 6-cylinder aircraft or water-cooled, large-displacement, V8 automotive engine, ranging from 50 to over 600 hp. Automotive engines tend to be less expensive due to easier maintenance, readily-available replacement parts, and less expensive (than avgas) high octane automotive gas.

At speed, most of the sound produced by an airboat comes from the propeller, although the engine itself also contributes some noise. Modern airboat designs are significantly quieter thanks to mufflers and multi-blade carbon-fiber propellers.

== Safety ==
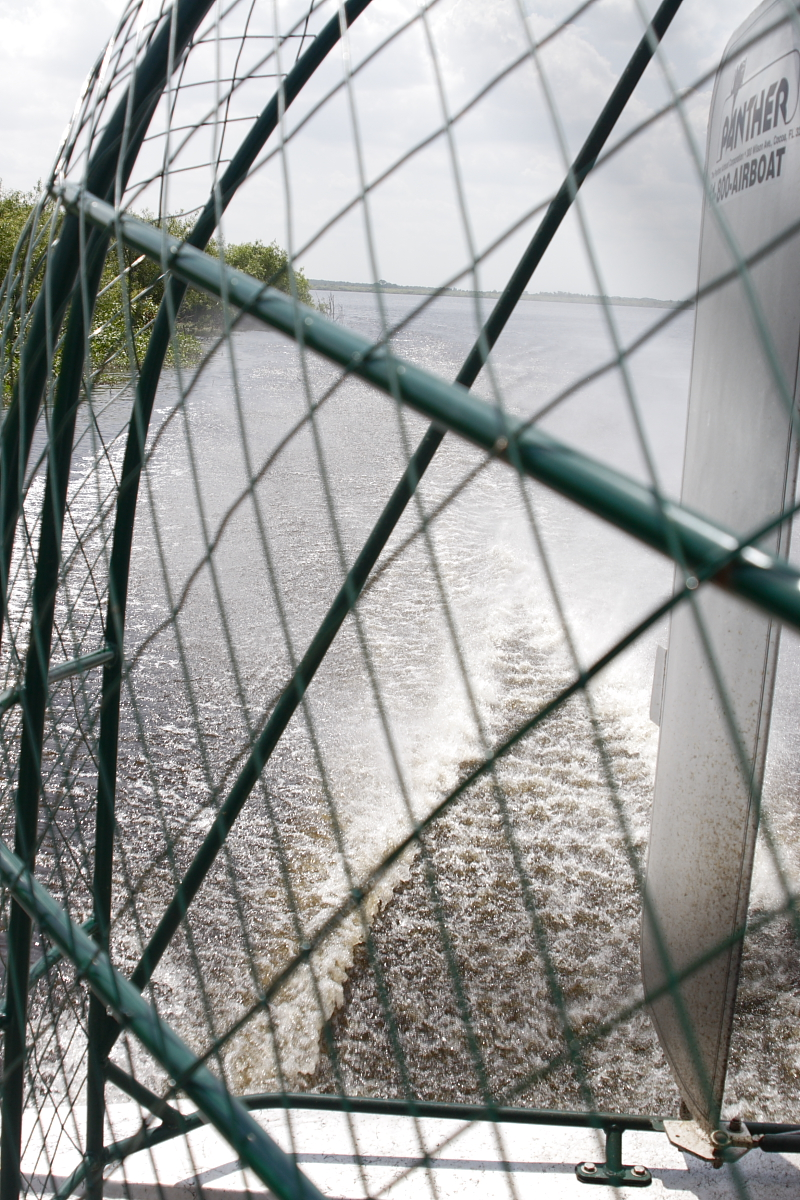
Aft view of a safety cage during operation

Airboats are equipped with such safety features as seatbelts and flotation devices/life jackets.

Over 75 airboat accidents happened in Florida between 2014 and 2017, resulting in seven deaths and 102 severe injuries. Five of these deaths were drownings, and 90 percent of accident victims were not wearing life jackets, even though only 30 percent knew how to swim. Forty percent of injured victims and the only two non-drowning fatalities were flung from their seats in the crashes.

According to a 2017 analysis by the Miami New Times, 64% of airboat accidents occurred due to operator error, attributable to one of three factors:

1. a lack of boating education or training;
2. a lack of safety equipment, such as seat belts or flotation devices, or a failure to properly use safety equipment;
3. or reckless behavior, including drug or alcohol consumption and improper lookout.

The engine and propeller of an airboat are enclosed in a protective metal cage that prevents objects such as tree limbs, branches, clothing, beverage containers, passengers, or wildlife, from coming into contact with the propeller.

Airboats are top-heavy, unstable, and extremely shallow draft, making them prone to capsizing and sinking, particularly in the open sea or in rough or stormy conditions. Airboats with a "long-belt gear reduction drive unit" and an automobile engine reduce these risks by mounting the engine inside the hull, which lowers the center of gravity. Some companies and organizations, including Airboat West and the Los Alamos National Laboratory, have built airboats with low centers of gravity for use in windy or rough conditions or in rescues with obstacles such as low-hanging power lines. Airboats can also be equipped with autoinflation devices that can reduce the risk of capsizing.

=== Regulation ===
Since 2018, the state of Florida requires operators to complete CPR instruction and a course on airboats run by the state's wildlife commission.

Florida state law also stipulates that airboats must have an "automotive-style factory muffler, underwater exhaust, or other manufactured device capable of adequately muffling the sound of the engine exhaust", and an international orange flag that is at least 10" by 12" flying from a mast or flagpole that is at least 10 feet taller than the lowest point on the boat, in order to increase visibility and reduce collisions.

The minimum age to operate an airboat in Florida is 14.

== Rescue ==
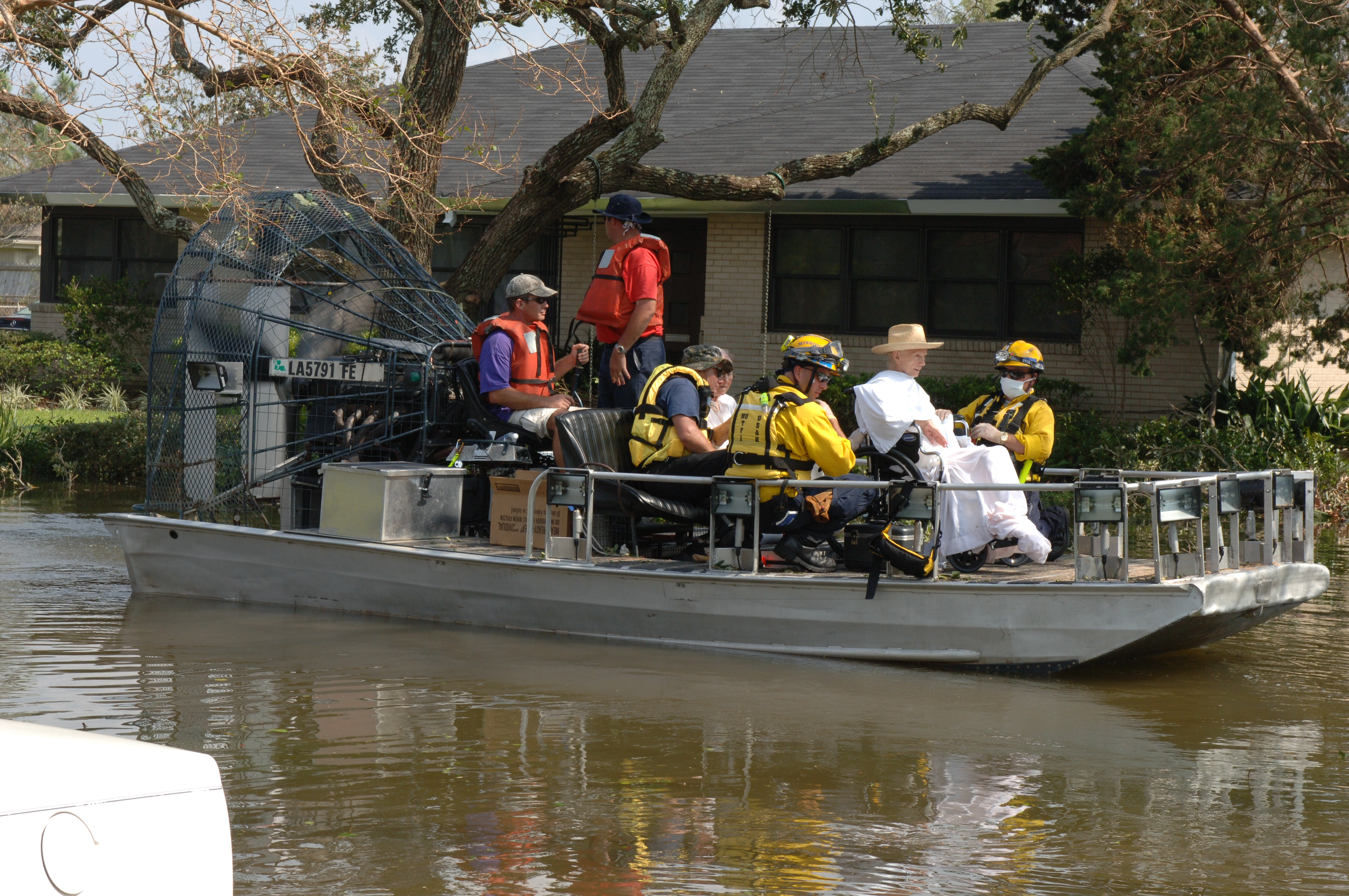
A resident is transported by airboat after Hurricane Katrina

In recent years, airboats have proven indispensable for flood, shallow water, and ice rescue operations. As a result, they have grown in popularity for public safety uses.

During the flooding of New Orleans following Hurricane Katrina, August 29, 2005, airboats from across the United States rescued thousands of flood victims. Thirty airboats crewed by civilian volunteers evacuated over 1,100 patients and 4,000 medical personnel and family members from four downtown New Orleans hospitals in less than 36 hours. This "Cajun Navy" morphed into a grassroots volunteer search and rescue organization that has deployed to rescue people during Hurricane Harvey, Hurricane Florence, and other natural disasters.

Numerous articles have been published in fire-rescue trade journals such as Fire Engineering and National Fire and Rescue Magazine describing the advantages, capabilities, and benefits of using airboats for water rescue operations, and providing in-depth description of actual water rescue incidents, including the flooding of New Orleans.

Airboats are particularly effective at water rescues in shallow, marshy, or icy winter environments. Airboats are partially amphibious and can therefore navigate effectively over obstacles, such as partially submerged buildings and wreckage or sea ice, that would stop a normal boat. In ice rescues, use of airboats cuts the average rescue time from 45 to 60 minutes to seven to 12 minutes, according to data from Minnesota fire departments. They are also faster, larger, safer, and more durable than other small boats used in ice rescues.

Though airboats are highly effective at water and ice rescues, airboats and helicopters do not work well together. Rotor wash from low-flying helicopters can push and even capsize airboats. During post-Katrina rescue operations, a helicopter's rotor wash was reported to have capsized one airboat, and many airboats were blown into the sides of buildings, standing utility poles, and bridge pilings by low-flying helicopters.

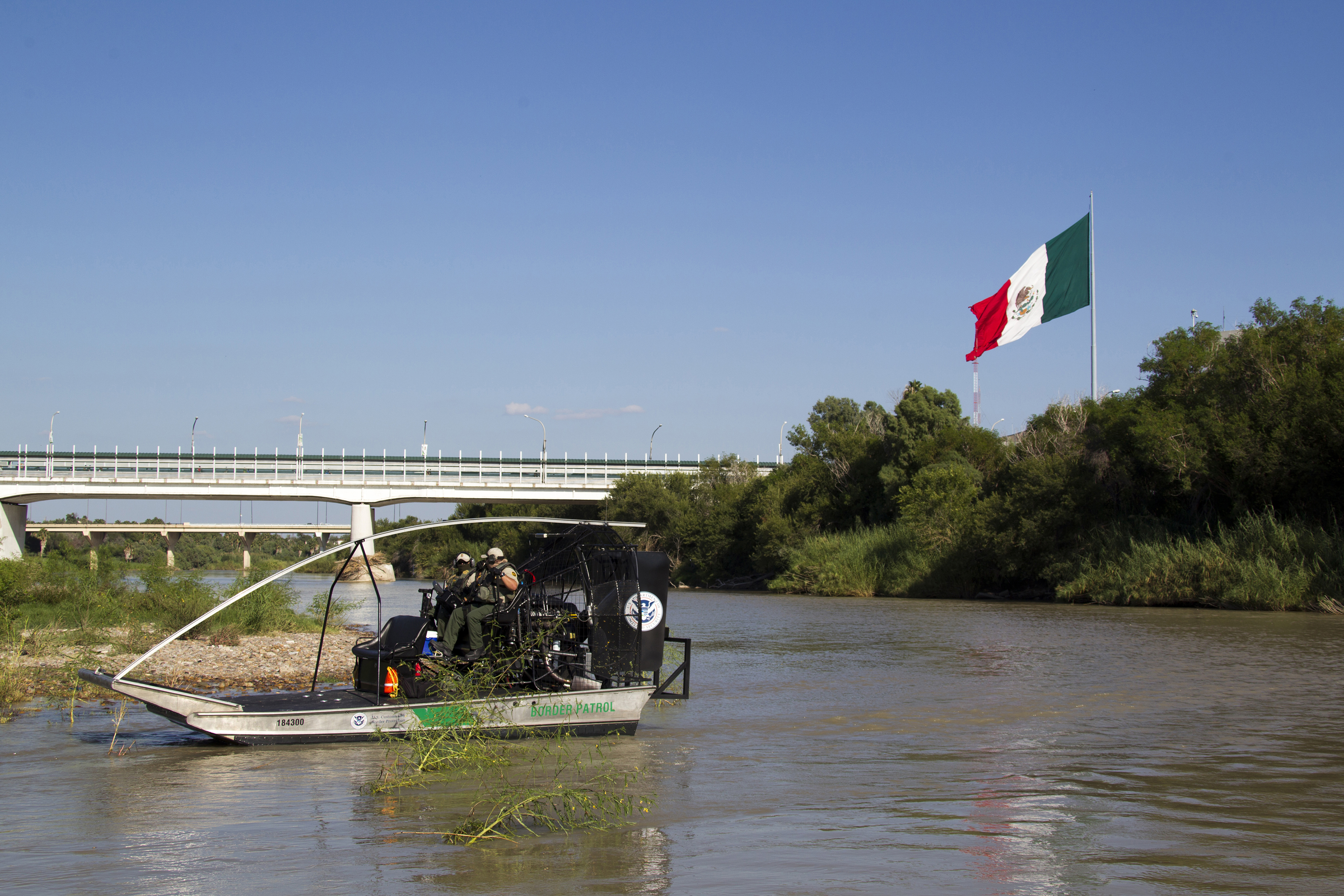
U.S. Customs and Border Protection patrols the Rio Grande River border in an airboat

== Military use ==
The Hostage Rescue Team of the FBI piloting an air boat at night with night vision goggles.

Airboats are used by various militaries and border patrols around the world as well as by the U.S. Coast Guard. In addition to the use of airboats by the British Army in the Mesopotamian Campaign of WWI and by the Soviet Union in the Eastern Front of WWII, airboats have been used by the US Army and Iraqi security forces in the Vietnam and Iraq wars, respectively.

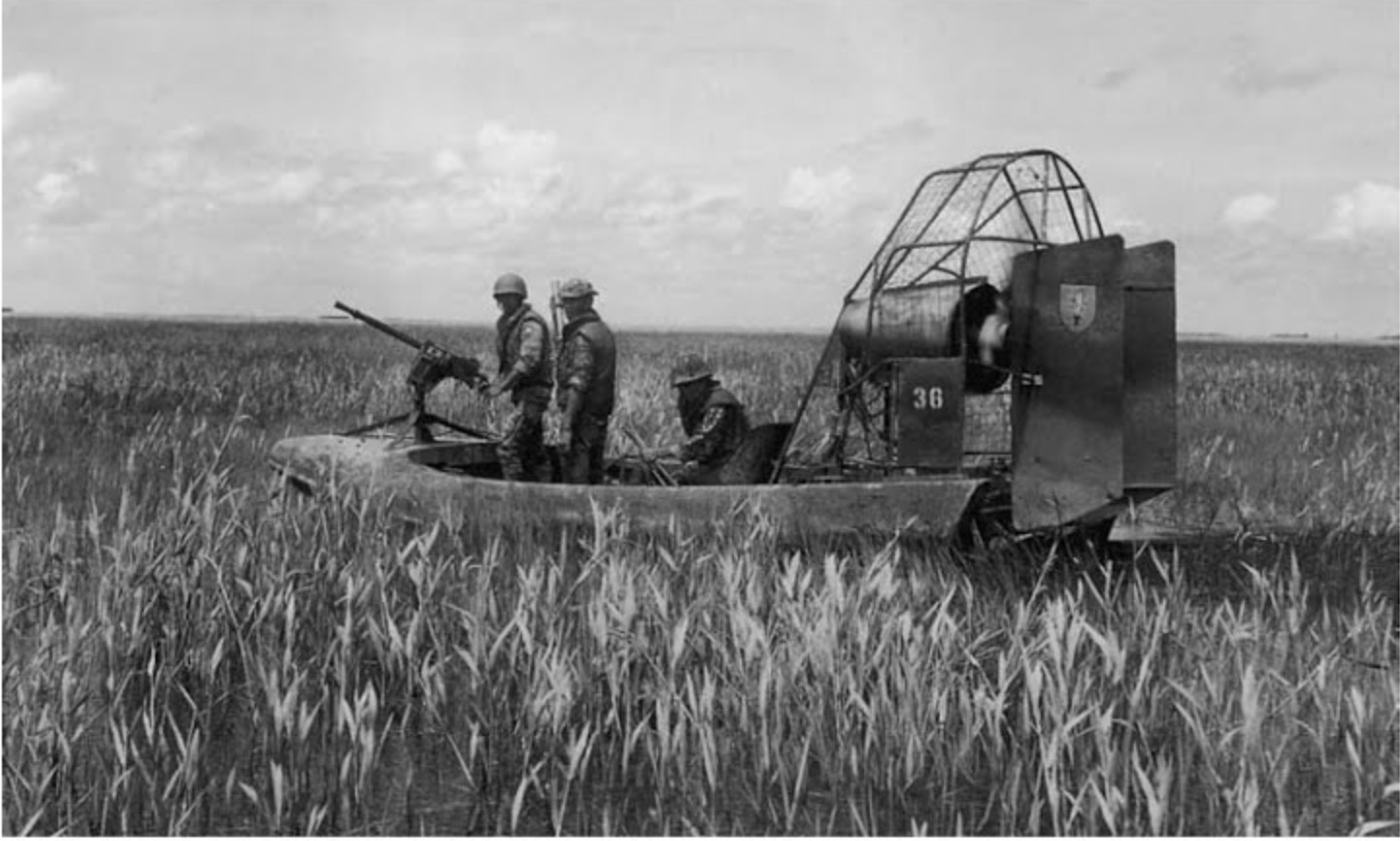
US Special Forces Aircat airboat in Vietnam

During the Vietnam War the Hurricane Aircat airboat was used by U.S. Special Forces and South Vietnamese troops to patrol riverine and marshy areas where larger boats could not go. Two of these airboats were also used by the Khmer National Navy after they were captured from the U.S. Special Forces by the People's Army of Vietnam (PAVN) in September 1967.

Airboats are also used in Texas and Iraq for border patrol. The airboats used in Iraq were supplied by American companies and assembled in Iraq by American civilian contractors, and they are used by both American and Iraqi forces to patrol the Tigris and Euphrates rivers, the marshes of southeastern Iraq, and the Shatt al-Arab waterway, the latter two of which include parts of the Iran-Iraq border. Modern Iraqi military airboats are 18 feet (5.5 m) long, powered by 454 hp engines hooked up to 78-inch (2.0 m) Whirlwind propellers, and armed with M240 crew-served machine guns. The Nov/Dec 2007 issue of Airboating Magazine had an article on airboats used in Vietnam and in Iraq and has had numerous articles on airboats used by U.S Coast Guard and other state and county EMS units for rescue of ice fisherman and rescue in floods or after hurricanes.

In 2013 the Iraqi Ministry of Oil purchased 20 airboats for use as personnel transport, patrol, and cable laying and light cargo boats in the rivers and marshes of Iraq.

== Tourism ==
Airboat rides have become popular as an ecotourism activity in several locations including the Florida Everglades and the Louisiana bayou. A typical airboat tour lasts between 60–90 minutes and carries passengers at speeds of up to 60 miles per hour. Most tour companies employ experienced captains who are able to point out alligators and other wildlife and flora from a safe distance. Most companies promote a very high chance of seeing an alligator on their tours.

== See also ==
- Hovercraft
- Hydrocopter
- Hydroplane (boat)
- Jetboat
- Rotor ship, a similar type of vessel using a vertical "pipe" to propel the air
