= Victory disease =

Disastrous military action after victory

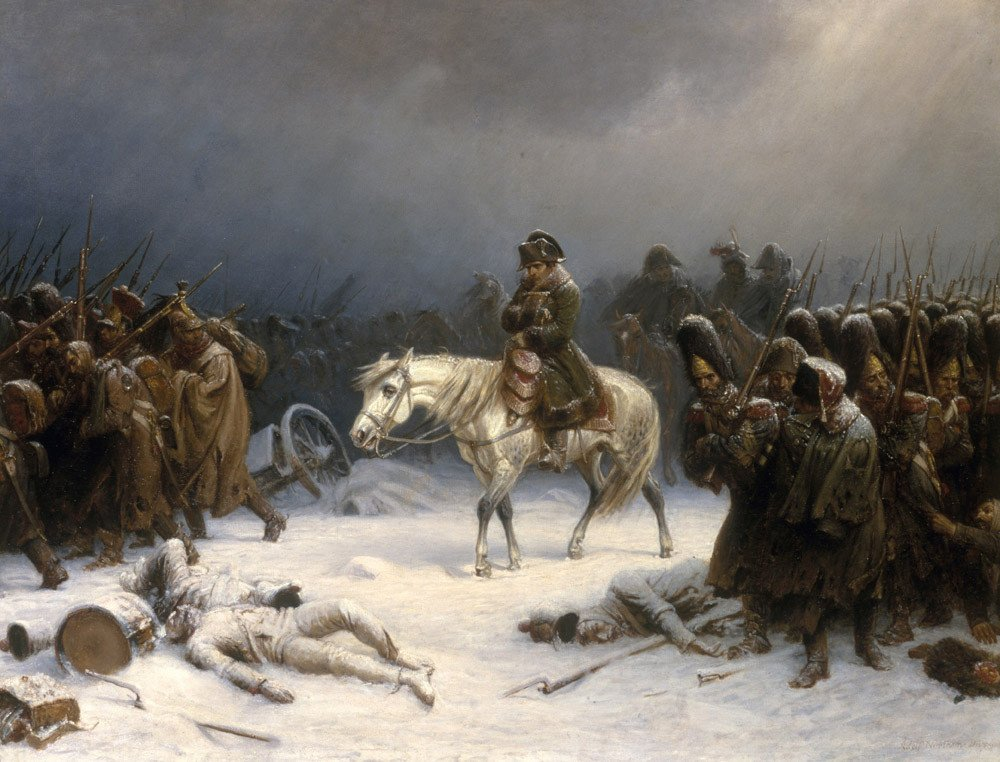
An example of victory disease and its catastrophic results: Napoleon's retreat from Moscow, painted by Adolph Northen in the 19th century

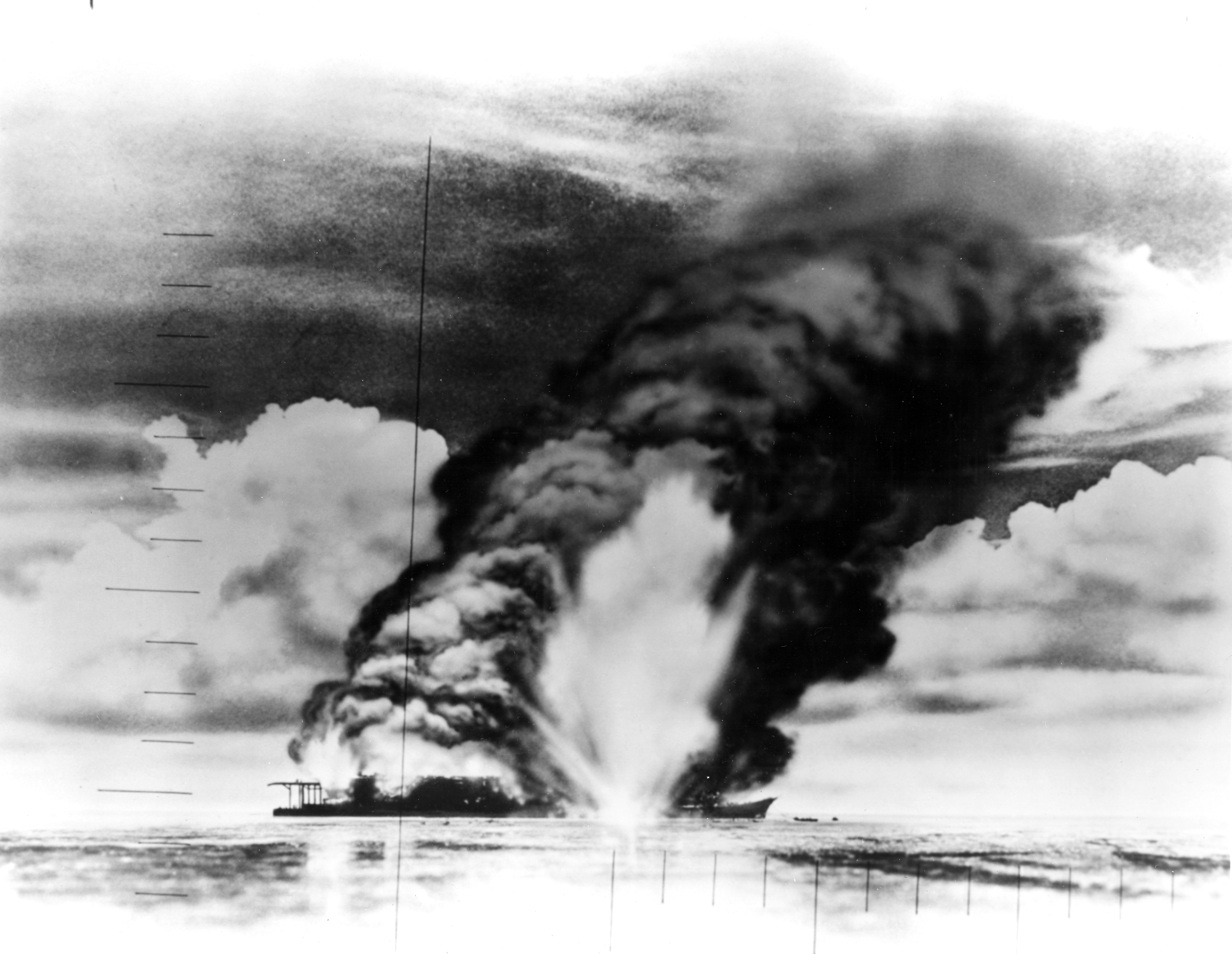
Diorama depicting the periscope-view from the US submarine USS Nautilus attacking a Japanese aircraft carrier at the Battle of Midway

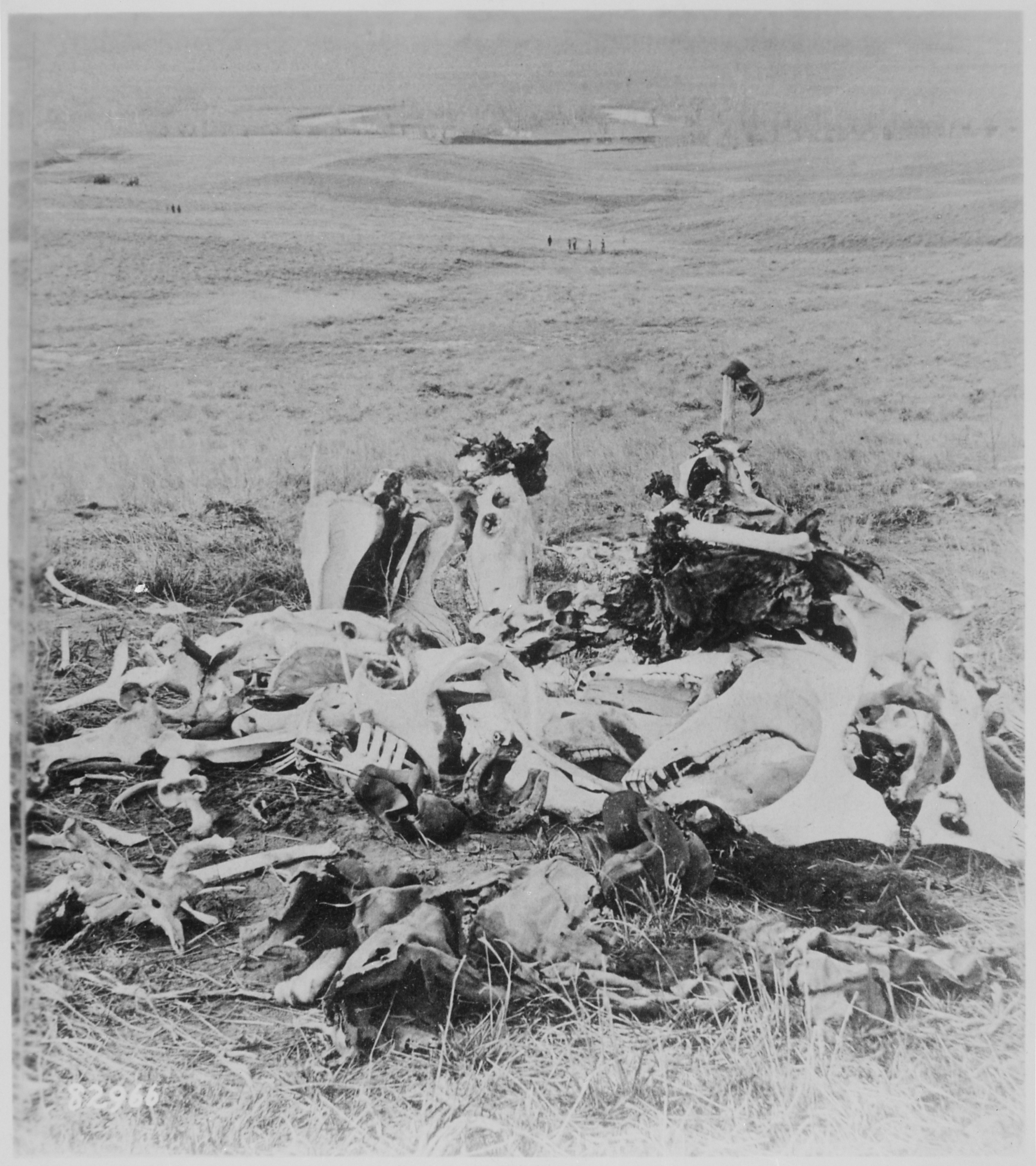
Custer's last stand, 1877

Victory disease occurs in military history when complacency or arrogance, brought on by a victory or a series of victories, makes an engagement end disastrously for a commander and his forces.

A commander may disdain the enemy, and believe his own invincibility, leading his troops to disaster. That commander may employ strategies that, if effective in earlier combats or maneuvers, prove catastrophic against a new or smarter enemy. The commander afflicted by "victory disease" may also fail to anticipate that a new enemy may use tactics different from those of old enemies. An overconfident commander may disregard military intelligence that would enable the commander to realize that new tactics are needed.

Though "victory disease" does not inevitably foretell defeat, it often precedes it. The term is also applied outside the military world in areas such as psychology, business, or marketing.

== Origin ==
The origin of the term (戦勝病, senshoubyou, in Japanese) is associated with the Japanese advance in the Pacific Theater of World War II, where, after attacking Pearl Harbor in 1941, Japan won a series of nearly uninterrupted victories against the Allies in Southeast Asia and the Pacific.

Much of Japan's arrogance is attributed to the performance of Admiral Matome Ugaki. From overriding decisions to ignoring the evolving conflict in the Pacific, Ugaki's tactics incited tension and doubt in other Japanese military personnel before the Midway operation.

Although the Japanese had planned to establish a perimeter and go on the defensive, victories encouraged them to continue expanding to an extent that strained logistics and the navy. This culminated in the Battle of Midway in 1942, a catastrophic defeat of the Japanese navy. All four Japanese aircraft carriers involved were sunk, and the hitherto unstoppable Japanese advance was blunted.

== History ==
=== Pre-industrial ===
- The hubris of Xerxes I led to a catastrophic defeat of the Achaemenid Empire in the Battle of Salamis, which occurred in 480 BC. This was the turning point of the Greco-Persian Wars and the ancient Greeks, who the Persians were opposing, eventually won. The ancient Greek playwright Aeschylus fought in the battle; he wrote the play The Persians in which the Battle of Salamis is a setting.
- In 1415, at the Battle of Agincourt, the English were outnumbered between three and five to one, but the disorganization of French knights, as well as superb quality longbows, were the underlying circumstances which led to the English overcoming the odds and annihilating the French.
- The overconfidence and lack of preparation led to the disastrous defeat of the English, led by Edward II at the Battle of Bannockburn to the Scots, led by Robert the Bruce.
- The Spanish naval assault on England in 1588 suffered the defeat of the Spanish Armada. Similarly, English overconfidence the following year led to the disaster of the English Armada.

=== 19th century ===
- The calamitous decision by Napoleon to invade Russia in 1812 led to the return of only 10,000 French soldiers when 610,000 had initially been sent out. Napoleon's repeated victories in Central Europe led him to believe that Russia would surrender after a few won battles, and made no plans for a sustained campaign or occupation in Russia.
- The first six weeks of the Franco-Prussian War saw French armies, convinced of their superiority following French victories in the Crimean War and the wars of Italian unification, enter a war with Prussia believing that their weapons and tactics would easily defeat the Prussians. However, the Prussians had better tactics and this led to catastrophic French defeats at Sedan and Metz.
- United States victories against Mexico and American Indians led Union forces to be overconfident going into the Civil War. Failing to update their tactics to match new technology, such as rifling of firearms and the use of the Minie ball as ammunition, they assumed that superior numbers would give them rapid victories, and ignored plans for an extended war until after repeated defeats.
- Confederate decisions made by at and before their loss at the Battle of Gettysburg, after their outnumbered-five-to-two victory at the Battle of Chancellorsville and previous battles before then in the Eastern Theater of the American Civil War during General Robert E. Lee's command of the Army of Northern Virginia.
- Captain and Brevet Lt. Col. William J. Fetterman boasted during America's Indian Wars that, given "80 men," he would "ride through the Sioux nation". He had contempt for the Sioux's fighting ability and overconfidence in his own military prowess. In 1866, during Red Cloud's War, he and his army of exactly 80 men (including two volunteering civilians) were massacred to the last man by a combined force of Lakota, Northern Cheyenne, and Arapaho. It was possibly the worst army defeat on the Great Plains until eclipsed by the disaster at Little Bighorn ten years later.
- The 1876 Battle of the Little Bighorn, in which the Lakota and Northern Cheyenne annihilated five companies of the 7th Cavalry under Lt. Col. George Armstrong Custer and severely mauled six others. Expecting a repeat of the Battle of Washita River, Custer ignored contrary intelligence or did not seek it out.
- In the 1879 Battle of Isandlwana, during the Anglo-Zulu War, a Zulu army wiped out a British army equipped with the most advanced weapons and tactics of the age. This victory at Isandlwana led a previously unengaged Zulus unit, Undi Corps under Prince Dabulamanzi kaMpande, to believe they would easily wipe out the British defenders in the Battle of Rorke's Drift with ferocity and sheer numbers and so attacked the location in violation of orders from King Cetshwayo kaMpande. Instead, the British, who used sensible tactics and concentrated their firepower as much as possible, won the battle and killed 351 confirmed Zulu men, with another 500 wounded.

=== 20th century ===
- The battles of Cer and Kolubara during the First World War were considered disastrous defeats for the Austro-Hungarian Monarchy, whose overconfidence and underestimation of the Serbian Army eventually led to a two-year delay in the Serbian Campaign.
- The Battle of Pingxingguan during the Second Sino-Japanese War between Japan and China. After a series of easy victories against their opponents, the overconfident Japanese failed to take elementary precautions.
- Italy's entry in WW2 (1940) followed a series of victories in Libya (1911-1912 against the Ottoman Empire), WW1 (1915-1918 against the Austro-Hungarian empire), again Libya in the "pacification campaign" (1922-1932), Ethiopia (1935-1936), Spain (1936-1939), and Albania (1939), which gave the Fascist regime the illusion of being able to sustain a global war against Britain.
- The catastrophic decision by Hitler to invade the Soviet Union in 1941 underestimated Soviet military resilience and counted on the success of the tactics used in previous campaigns, such as the Invasion of Poland and the Battle of France. Confident of victory, the Germans did not count on getting caught in a Russian winter or rasputitsa (mud season). As a result, the German offensive in the Soviet Union was halted on December 5, 1941.
- Japan's decision to attack Pearl Harbor on December 7, 1941. This followed wins in the First Sino-Japanese War, the Russo-Japanese War and the First World War, and early victories during the Second Sino-Japanese War. As it turned out, the attack appeared tactically successful, but was strategically disastrous with the US Pacific Fleet damaged to a relatively superficial degree, with its carrier groups out at sea while vital shore base facilities were ignored in the attack such as its fuel storage, whose destruction could have crippled fleet operations for months by itself. More significantly, with the corresponding Japanese diplomatic communication being too slow to process and present to the American government until after the attack began, the attack, intended in part to demoralize the Americans, provoked instead an infuriated retaliation that would ultimately defeat Japan.
- Gamal Abdel Nasser, President of Egypt, believed that during the Suez Crisis, the Egyptian Armed forces had defeated the combined forces of Israel, the United Kingdom and France, when in reality it was the pressure from the United States which was the decisive factor. This gave Nasser an inflated view of the strength of his forces, so when the Six Day War started, he believed that Egypt would be able to defend itself against Israel's advance. However, this overconfidence, as well as false "victory" reports which brought Jordan and Syria into the war, proved to be its downfall as Israel managed to defeat the Arab forces and conquered their territory as well.

== See also ==
- Communal reinforcement
- Confirmation bias
- Groupthink
- List of military disasters
- Narcissism
- Pyrrhic victory
