= Hydrocopter =

Amphibious propeller-driven catamaran

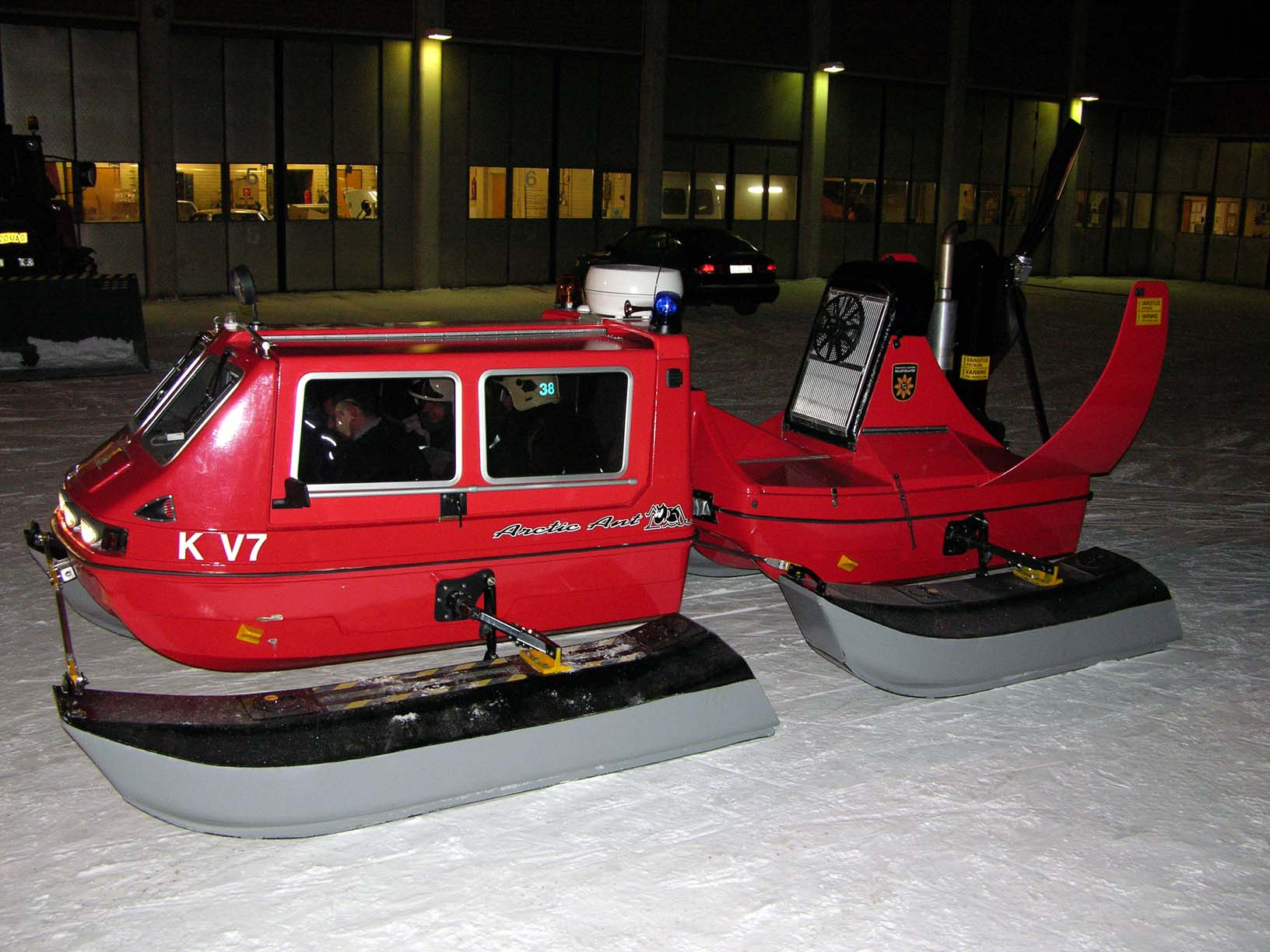
A rescue hydrocopter in Kuopio, Finland

A hydrocopter is an amphibious propeller-driven catamaran with a boat-like hull, small wheels and pontoon skis (as in a seaplane). An aircraft engine with a propeller and air rudder powers the vehicle over water, ice, snow and land.

Hydrocopters are used in Arctic coastal regions, primarily Sweden and Finland, during "menföre" (Swedish, bad going), or "kelirikko" (Finnish broken going), when melting ice cannot support ground vehicles and boats are hindered as well. Hydrocopters are often used as a low-cost alternative to hovercraft and helicopters. Hydrocopters are primarily produced in small machine shops or made by hobbyists and have never been mass produced.

== Design and manufacturing ==
Hydrocopters are generally smaller vehicles less than 20 ft long and weigh less than 2000 kg. Hydrocopters are powered by a fixed bladed aircraft propeller, the same as an airboat. Although they have the same propulsion as airboats, they are typically much slower. They typically travel under 12 knots whereas airboats are typically traveling over 40 knots. Hydrocopters use either skis or wheels on their pontoons to be able to travel on ice, snow or land in addition to traveling on water. This allows them to travel over terrain similar to a hovercraft.

Hydrocopters use one system for lift and forward momentum while a hovercraft uses two systems, one for lift and another for forward momentum. Hovercraft have a constant down thrust which can be undesirable in certain conditions. Hydrocopters are also much cheaper than hovercraft.

Hydrocopters have never been mass produced; they are made in small machine shops for individual customers. Consequently, they are easy to customize and there is a small but strong market for them. One of the first hydrocopters that was patented was called the Spider Craft. It is a small two-seater pontooned airboat and was patented in 1965. Since that time, hydrocopters have gone through multiple iterations. The current iteration is a modular design with steering and propulsion in the stern and the main cabin is in the first segment. This two-section design allows for faster turning and gives the occupants more space. Hydrocopters tend to use heavier fuel oil than airboats and airplanes. Additives are added to the fuel oil to avoid problems of freezing temperatures. Modern hydrocopters are primarily made from vacuum injected composites with a coating to prevent damage from moisture and cold temperatures. Hydrocopters used to be made much like airplanes or boats with an aluminum shell and a wooden interior. Lighter materials use less fuel and composites are more resistant to corrosion in the harsh environment. The pontoons in modern hydrocopters typically have more buoyancy to allow for heavier cargo loads.

== Safety ==
Hydrocopters, like air boats, are top heavy. This can cause issues with capsizing (rolling over) or flipping. Hydrocopters usually have less points of contact on the water and a high center of gravity so risk of capsizing is increased, especially in rough seas. However, they are usually safer than air boats because they travel at much slower speeds. Consequently, hydrocopters don’t often get out of displacement mode, which means that most of the weight of the hydrocopter is supported by the water. Modern hydrocopters typically have two compartments. The rear compartment houses the engine and the front cabin houses the passengers. These two compartments provide the hydrocopter with much more stability when doing sharp turns.

Most hydrocopters are now equipped with radars, GPS and/or AIS to be able to locate other vessels and to be visible to other vessels. This equipment helps drivers in adverse weather when visibility is very low, which is typical of the Arctic coastal regions. Hydrocopters are one of the few vehicles that can operate in heavy snow or rain. Hydrocopters are also commonly equipped with other safety equipment such as life jackets, VHF radios and EPIRBs (Emergency Position Indicating Radio Beacons). The safety regulations implemented on hydrocopters is the same as the regulations on a boat of that size. Many hydrocopters are built for search and rescue operations and these hydrocopters carry much more safety equipment. The interior of these hydrocopters are outfitted similar to ambulances.

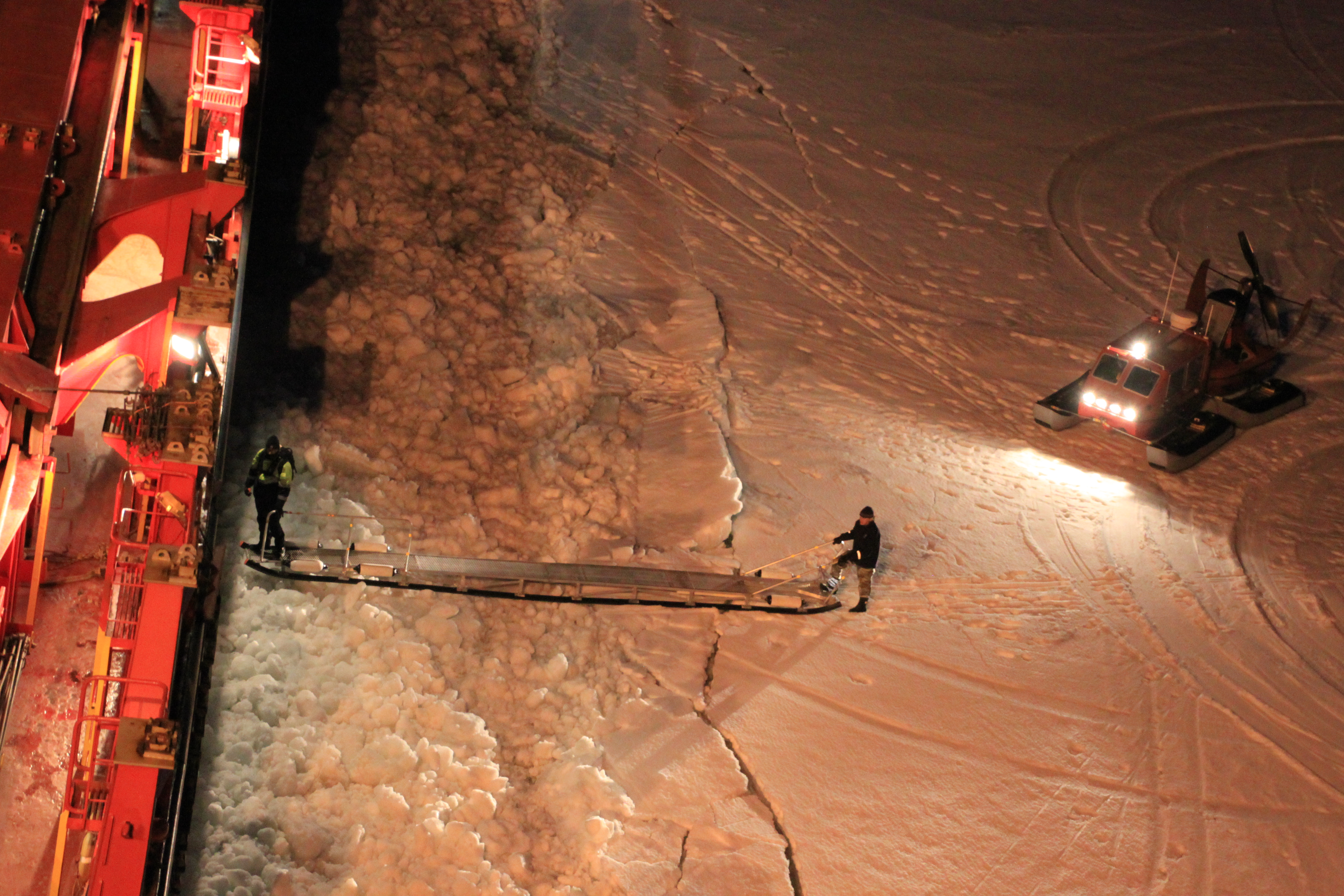
A pilot boarding a ship from ice off Oulu using a hydrocopter to reach the shipping lane in icy conditions.

== Military use ==
The Finnish Border Guard used hydrocopters from the 1970s to the 2000s. The Finnish Border Guard then replaced their fleet of hydrocopters with hovercraft because of stricter work safety standards. Many towns and cities in Finland and Sweden used the surplus military hydrocopters and continue to use hydrocopters today in some capacity as search and rescue craft because they are cheaper than hovercraft and can be used safely in ice and water where other vehicles could not work.

== See also ==
- Aerosledge
