= Russian Winter =

Winter in Russia in the context of military campaigns

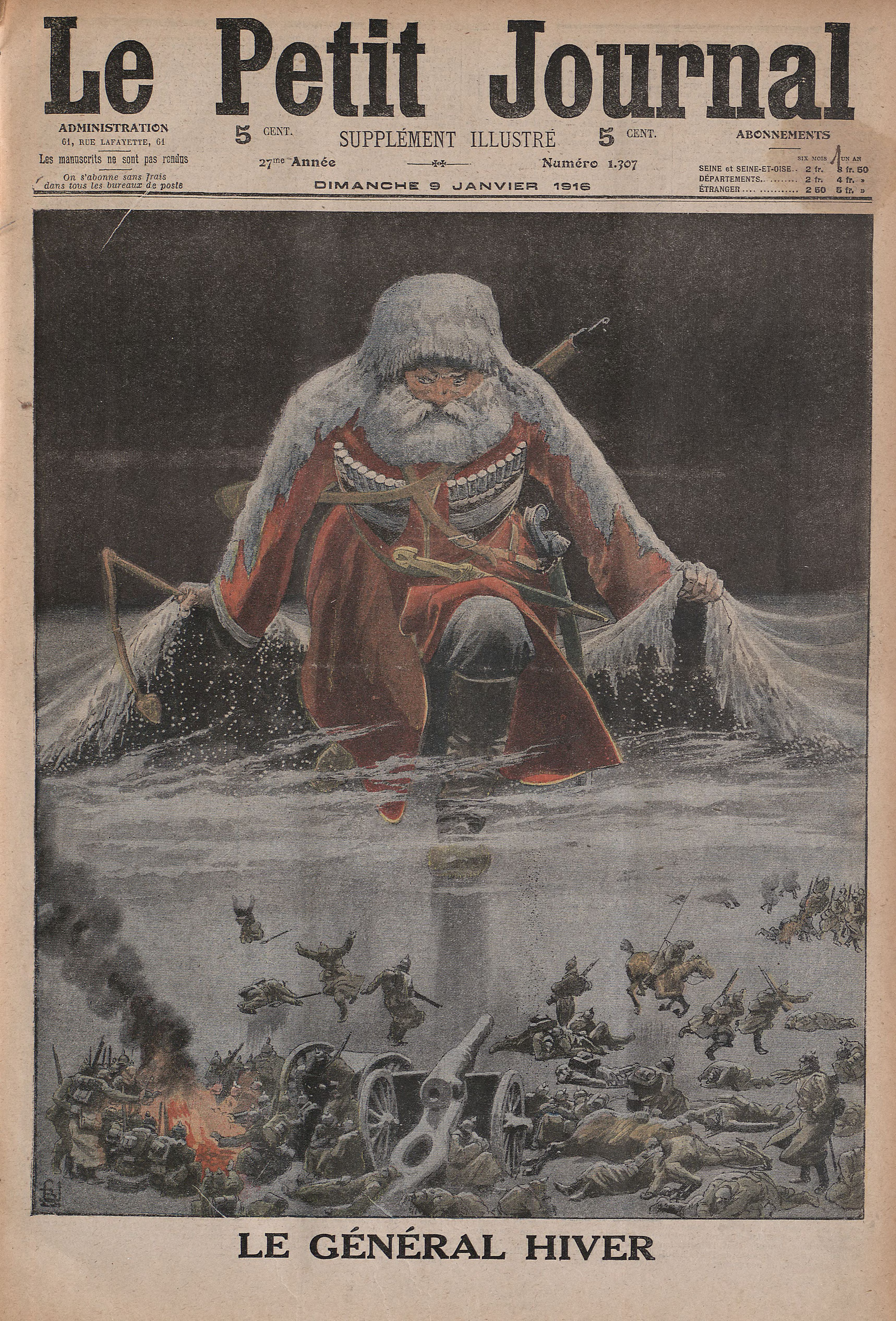
"General Winter", from a 1916 front page illustration of the French periodical Le Petit Journal

Russian Winter, sometimes personified as "General Frost" or "General Winter", is an aspect of the climate of Russia that has contributed to military failures of several invasions of Russia and the Soviet Union. Mud is a related contributing factor that impairs military maneuvering in Russia and elsewhere, and is sometimes personified as "General Mud". Russians call these muddy conditions rasputitsa, which occur with autumnal rains and spring thaws in Russia and make transport over unimproved roads difficult.

== Winter as a contributing factor to military defeat ==
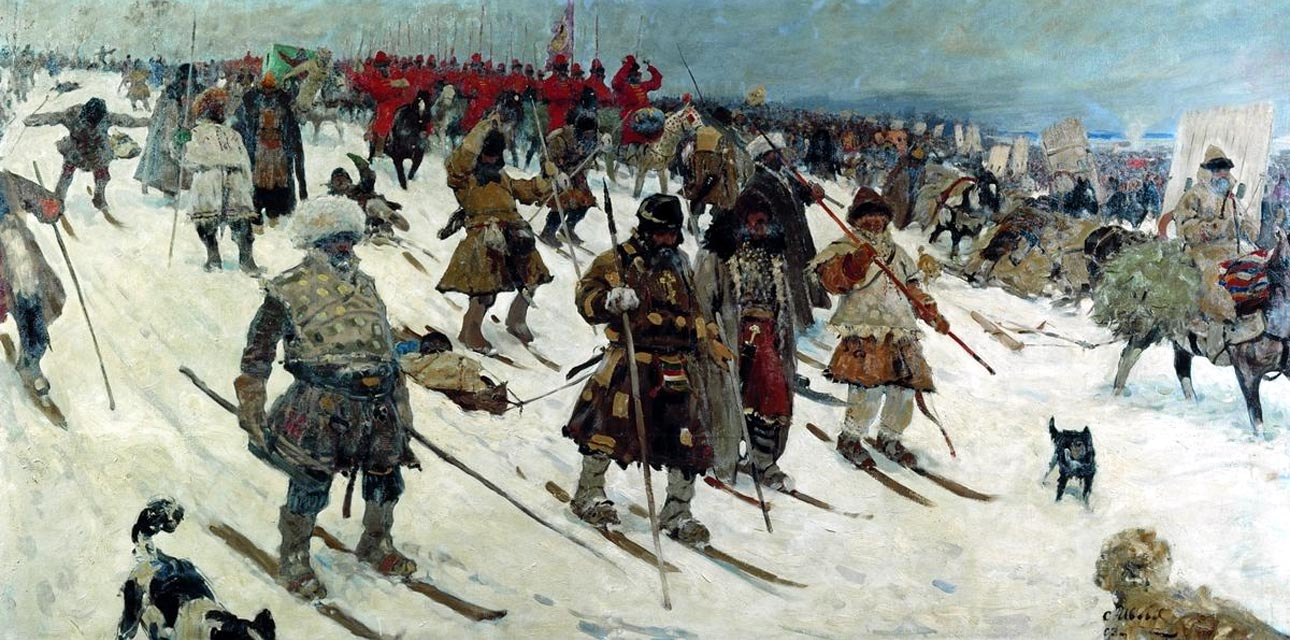
Russians used skis in the third Muscovite–Lithuanian War (1507–1508).

In his study of winter warfare in Russia, author Allen F. Chew concludes that "General Winter" was a 'substantial contributing factor'—not a decisive one—in the military failures of both Napoleon's invasion of the Russian Empire and Hitler's invasion of the Soviet Union. He notes that Napoleon's army was already suffering significant attrition before winter, owing to lack of supplies, disease, desertions and casualties of war. Likewise, Hitler's Wehrmacht had already suffered 734,000 casualties and was running low on supplies in November 1941, before the arrival of winter.

== Examples ==
=== Swedish invasion of 1708 ===
In the Great Northern War, Charles XII of Sweden invaded the Russian Empire, crossing the Vistula on 1 January 1708. The Russians retreated, adopting a scorched-earth policy. The winter of 1708–1709 was the most brutal of the 18th century, so severe that the seaport of Venice froze during the Great Frost of 1709. Charles' 35,000 troops were crippled, and by the spring of 1709 only 19,000 were left. The Battle of Poltava in the Ukrainian Cossack Hetmanate in late June 1709 sealed the end of the Swedish Empire.

=== French invasion of 1812 ===
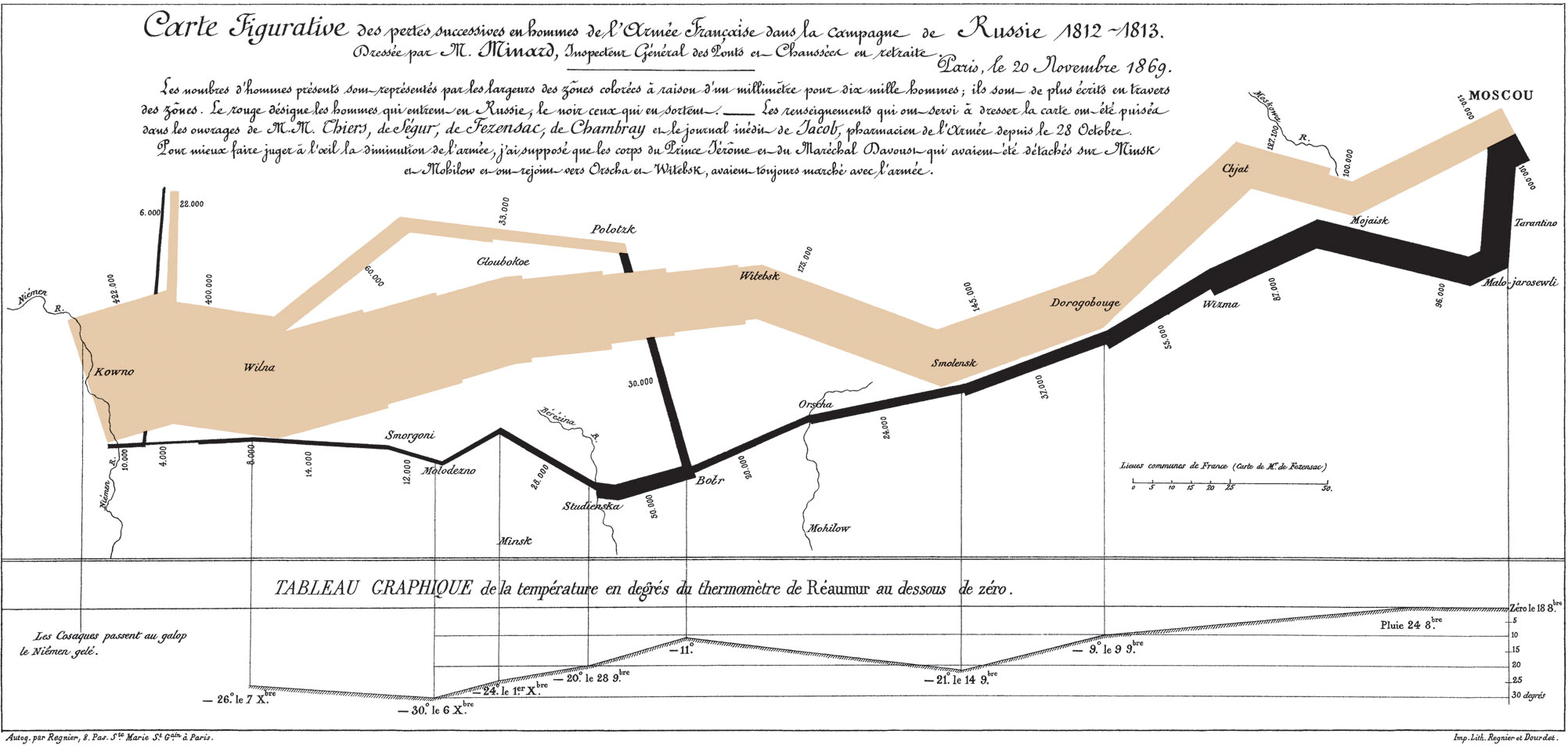
Charles Minard's graph showing the strength of the Grande Armée as it marched to Moscow and back, with temperature (in Réaumur) plotted on the lower graph for the return journey. –30 degrees Réaumur = –37.5 °C = –35.5 °F

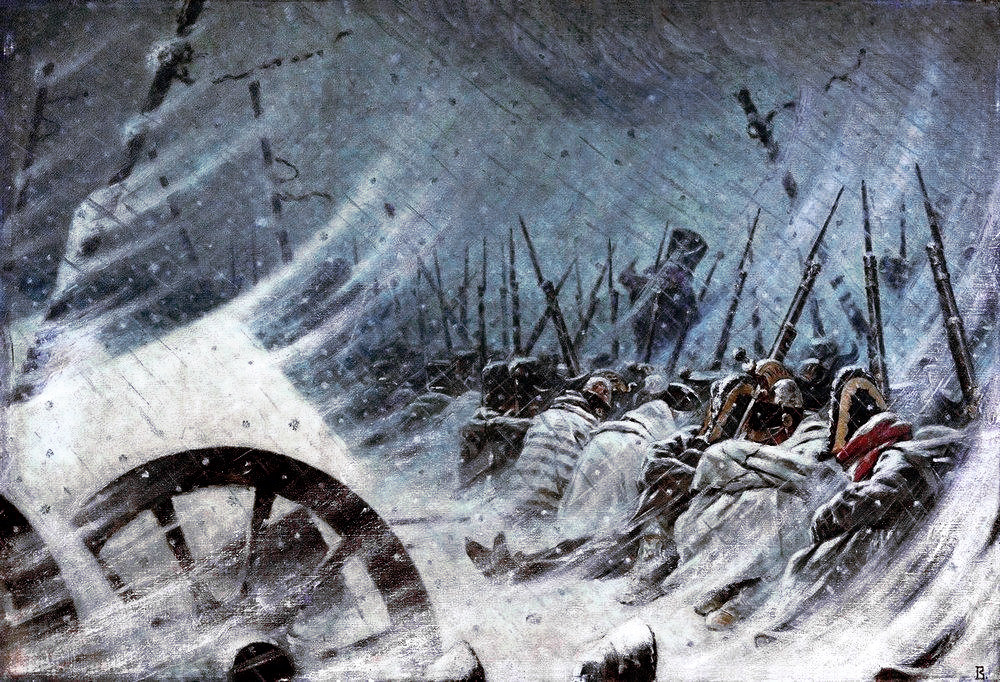
The Night Bivouac of Napoleon's Army during retreat from Russia in 1812.

Napoleon's Grande Armée of 610,000 men invaded Russia, heading through territory of today's Belarus towards Moscow, in the beginning of summer on 24 June 1812. The Russian army retreated before the French and again burnt their crops and villages, denying the enemy their use. Napoleon's army was ultimately reduced to 100,000. His army suffered further, even more disastrous losses on the retreat from Moscow, which started in October. Multiple sources concur that winter and its aftermath was only a contributing factor to Napoleon's defeat and retreat.

To counter claims that the French defeat resulted from winter weather, Denis Davydov published a military historical analysis, titled "Was it Frost that Devastated the French Army in 1812?", wherein he demonstrated that the French suffered casualties in battles during relatively mild weather and outlined multiple causes for their defeat. He drew on both his direct observations and on those of foreign commentators, including French authors.

According to Chew in 1981, the main body of Napoleon's Grande Armée, initially at least 378,000 strong, "diminished by half during the first eight weeks of his invasion, before the major battle of the campaign. This decrease was partly due to garrisoning supply centres, but disease, desertions, and casualties sustained in various minor actions caused thousands of losses. At the Battle of Borodino, about 110 km from Moscow, on 7 September 1812—the only major engagement fought in Russia—Napoleon could muster no more than 135,000 troops and he lost at least 30,000 of them to gain a narrow and pyrrhic victory almost 600 miles inside hostile territory. The sequels were his uncontested and self-defeating occupation of Moscow and his humiliating retreat, which began on 19 October, before the first severe frosts later that month and the first snow on 5 November." Lieven cites the difficulty of finding food for troops and forage for horses in winter as an important contributing factor.

=== Allied intervention in Russia, winter 1918–19 ===
During the Northern Russian expedition of the Allied intervention in the Russian Civil War in the Archangelsk region, both sides, the Allied forces and the Bolshevik Red Army knew or quickly learned the principles of winter warfare and applied them whenever possible. However both sides had their resources strained and at times one side or other suffered the severe consequences of underpreparedness, but Chew concluded that winter did not provide a decisive advantage to any of the combatants.

=== German invasion of 1941 ===
During World War II, the Wehrmacht lacked necessary supplies, such as winter uniforms, due to the many delays in the German army's movements. At the same time, Hitler's plans for the 1941 invasion of the Soviet Union, Operation Barbarossa, actually miscarried before the onset of severe winter weather. Neither Hitler nor the General Staff anticipated a long campaign lasting into the winter. Thus, they failed to make adequate preparations for a possible winter campaign, such as the distribution of warm clothing and winterization of vehicles and lubricants. In fact his eastern army suffered more than 734,000 casualties (about 23% of its average strength of 3,200,000) during the first five months of the invasion before the winter started in recently occupied Poland and Soviet Belarus, Ukraine, and western Russia. On 27 November 1941, Eduard Wagner, the Quartermaster General of the German Army, reported that "We are at the end of our resources in both personnel and materiel. We are about to be confronted with the dangers of deep winter." Also of note is the fact that the unusually early winter of 1941 cut short the rasputitsa season, improving logistics in early November, with the weather still being only mildly cold.

== Winter effects on warfare ==
In his 1981 paper, Fighting the Russians in Winter: Three Case Studies, Chew draws on experiences from the Allied intervention in northern Russia during the winter of 1918–19, the destruction of the Soviet 44th Motorized Rifle Division, and German–Soviet war during World War II to derive winter warfare factors pertaining to military tactics, materiel and personnel:

- Tactics – Defensive positions are highly advantageous because of the ability to maintain warmth and protection, compared to attacking in winter cold. Mobility and logistical support are often restricted by snow, requiring plowing or compacting it to accommodate wide-tracked vehicles or sleds. Infantry movement in deep snow requires skis or snowshoes to avoid exhaustion. Sound carries well over crusted snow, diminishing the element of surprise. Explosives are useful for excavating foxholes and larger shelters in frozen ground. Attacking field kitchens and encampments deprives the enemy of food and shelter. Rapid removal of the wounded from the battlefield is essential to their survival in the cold.
- Materiel – Weapons and vehicles require special lubricants to operate at low temperatures. Mines are unreliable in winter, owing to deep snow that may cushion the fuse or form an ice bridge over the detonator.
- Personnel – Proper winter clothing is required to maintain body heat and to avoid such cold injuries as frostbite. Troop efficiency and survival requires either making use of available shelter or providing portable shelter.

Sandy Woodward, Royal Navy task force commander during the Falklands War, which was fought before the oncoming South Atlantic winter, remarked in his memoirs, "I thought then, for the first time, about the arrival of General Winter. If he had been here ten days ago, he would not have been much help to the Args [Argentines], dug in on the heights with no chance of their High Command getting their air forces into the skies. But I think he would’ve finished us."

== See also ==
- History of Russia
- Graveyard of empires
- Winter War
