= Fire Engineering (magazine) =

American magazine

- Editor-in-chief: David Rhodes
- Vice President, Editorial Director: Diane Rothschild
- Circulation: 49,503 (Audited by Alliance for Audited Media)
- Publisher: Clarion Events
- Founded: 1877
- Country: United States
- Based in: Fair Lawn, New Jersey
- Language: English
- Website: www.fireengineering.com

Fire Engineering is an American magazine which provides training, education, and management information for fire and emergency services personnel. Articles are written by experts in the fire service and focus on lessons-learned.

== History ==
November 1877: Introduced as The National Fireman’s Journal
1879: Renamed The Fireman’s Journal
1886: Renamed Fire and Water
1903: Renamed Fire and Water Engineering
1926: Renamed Fire Engineering (its name until today)

Fire Engineering was originally introduced on November 17, 1877 as The National Fireman’s Journal. Its editor was Clifford Thomson and was published in New York City. Its tagline was "Devoted to the Interests of the Firemen of the Country." In 1879 it was renamed The Fireman’s Journal and was published weekly with a cover price of five cents. Its name was changed again in 1886 to Fire and Water. In 1903 it had another change to Fire and Water Engineering. In 1926 the magazine published under the name Fire Engineering and has kept the name since.

== Circulation ==
Fire Engineering's readership is audited by the Alliance for Audited Media; it has a paid circulation of 49,503 and the readership focus includes: paid and volunteer municipal fire departments, district, county, and township fire companies, and fire officials, fire companies, fire fighters, and other fire officials. The primary classification analysis includes management, training, prevention, suppression, investigation, and maintenance.

== 9-11 ==
In January 2002, then Fire Engineering Editor Bill Manning wrote an editorial criticizing FEMA and the American Society of Civil Engineers for their official investigation of the events of 9-11, calling it a “half-baked farce that may already have been commandeered by political forces whose primary interests, to put it mildly, lie far afield of full disclosure.” The editorial was picked up by multiple organizations, including Architects & Engineers for 9/11 Truth (AE911Truth) for use in their research edition of “9/11: Blueprint for Truth.” Manning also indicated that the destruction of the steel was illegal, based on his review of the national standard for fire investigation, NFPA 921 which provides no exemption to the requirement that evidence be saved in cases of fires in buildings over 10 stories tall. A New York Times article reported that Senator Charles E. Schumer and Senator Hillary Rodham Clinton also called for a wider look into the collapses. In an interview on Friday, Mr. Schumer said he supported a new investigation "not so much to find blame" for the collapse of the buildings under extraordinary circumstances, "but rather so that we can prepare better for the future."

== 9-11 philanthropy ==
Fire Engineering, the Fire Department Instructor’s Conference, and then-publisher PennWell established the Courage and Valor Foundation after 9-11. The Foundation was created to ensure that we as Americans "Remember Forever" the fallen firefighters of September 11, and in their memory, recognize other firefighters who demonstrate that same courage and valor. This tax-free Foundation is working to raise $1,000,000 to fund the Foundation's annual Ray Downey Courage and Valor Award in perpetuity. PennWell contributed an initial endowment of $25,000 and will match contributor donations at a rate of one dollar for every nine dollars contributed, up to $100,000. The income from the Foundation will be awarded annually to a firefighter, either posthumously or to a surviving family member for exemplary courage and valor in a rescue operation during the preceding year. The book, Fallen Heroes, has been published by PennWell to support the Courage and Valor Foundation.
