= Rasputitsa =

Mud season in rural Eastern Europe

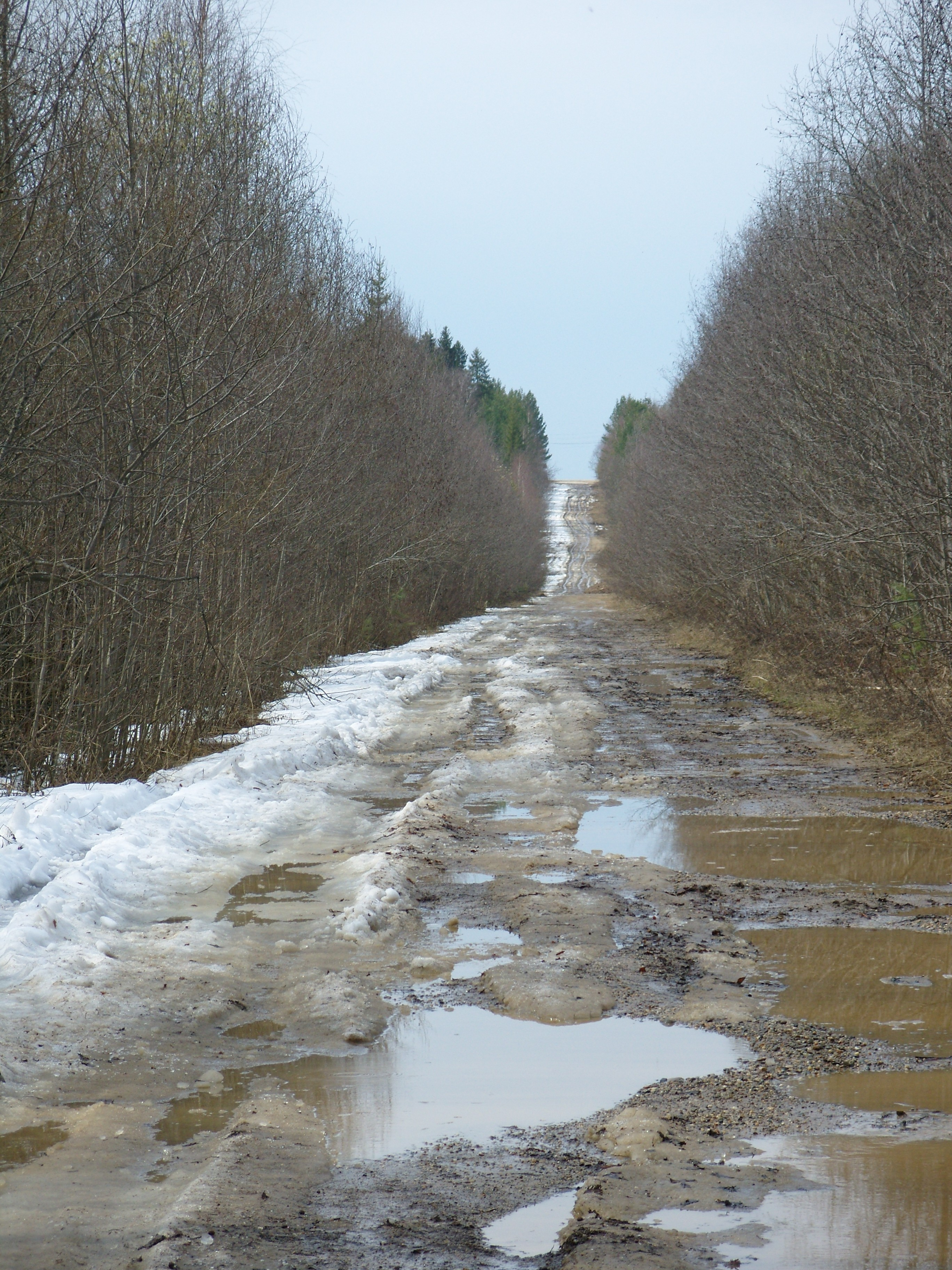
Spring thaw and huge puddles in Komi Republic, March 2015

Rasputitsa is the mud season that occurs in various rural areas of Eastern Europe, when the rapid snowmelt or thawing of frozen ground combined with wet weather in spring, or heavy rains in autumn lead to muddy conditions that make travel on unpaved roads problematic and even treacherous.

Rasputitsa has repeatedly affected wars by causing military vehicles and artillery pieces to become mired in the mud. In conjunction with the general conditions of winter, rasputitsa has been credited with encumbering the military campaigns of the French Empire in 1812 and Nazi Germany in 1941, as well as all belligerents in the Russian invasion of Ukraine.

In countries of the former Soviet Union, the concept is applied to two periods during the year – spring and autumn – and also refers to impassable road conditions during such a period, specifically the heavy rains of October and the thaw of the frozen steppe in March.

== Etymology ==
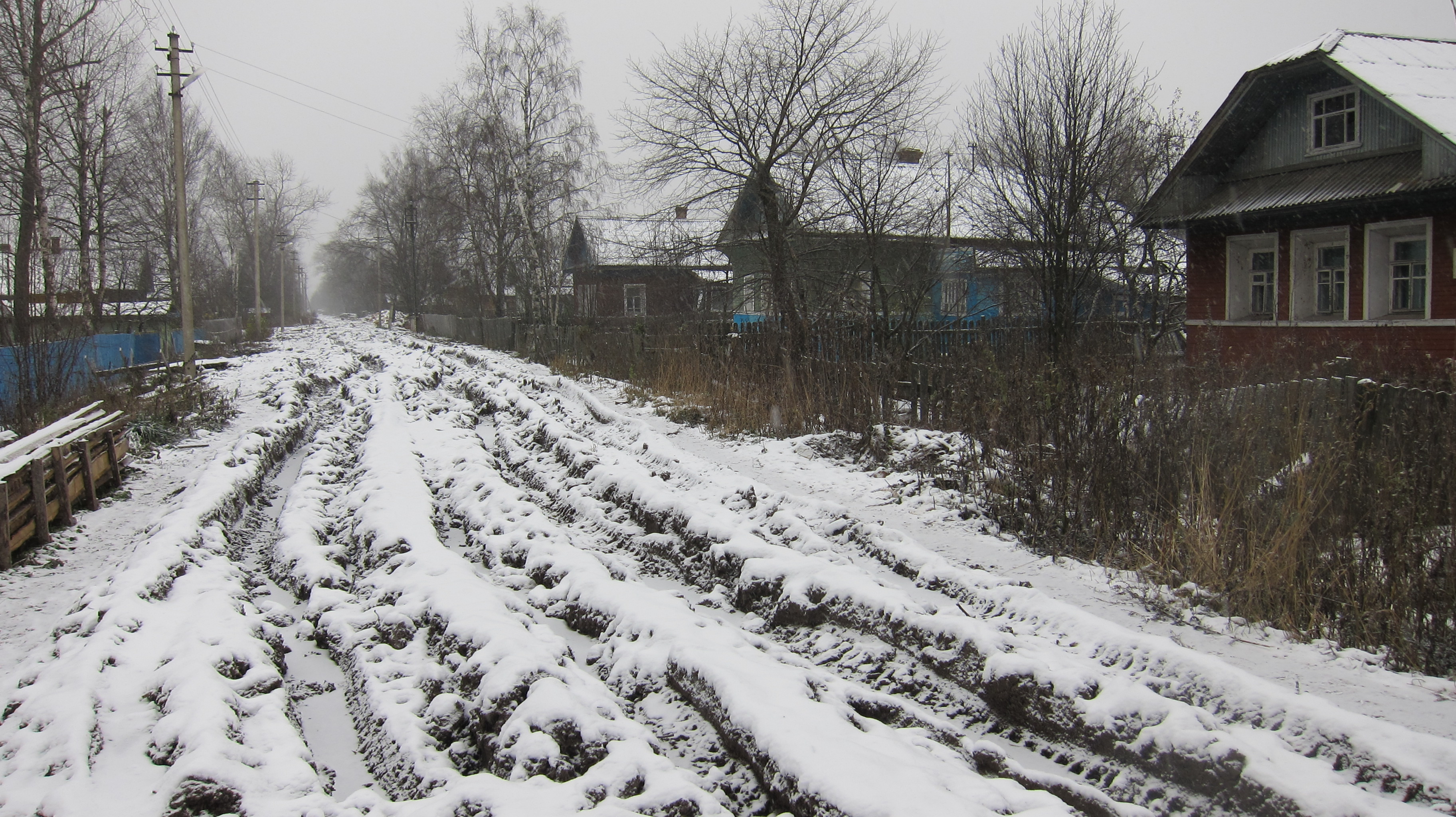
Thick snow cover and waterlogged soil in Sokol, Russia, October 2012

The Russian term rasputitsa is derived from the root путь (put′), 'road, way, travel' + the prefix рас- (ras) 'discrepancy, divergence' + the diminutive suffix -иц (it͡s) + the feminine noun ending а (a).

The Ukrainian term бездоріжжя, bezdorizhzhia, 'roadlessness' usually refers to spring, and occasionally to autumn, when rain and/or melting snow on unpaved roads, tracks, paths, or any poorly-drained off-road area turns the route into impassable deep mud.

== Effects ==
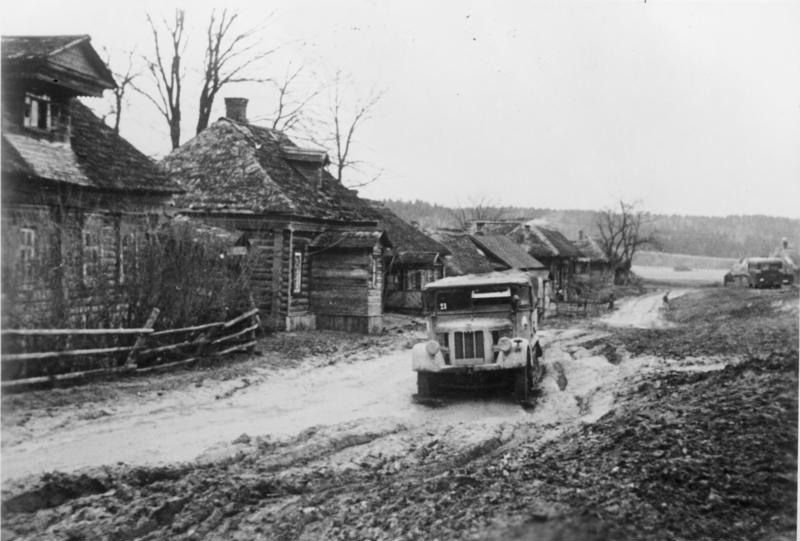
Village street in Moscow oblast, November 1941

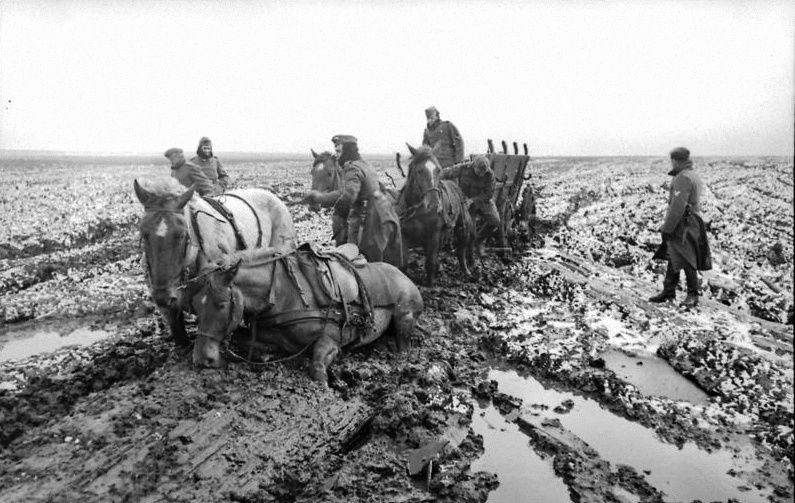
German horses and cart stuck in mud (near Kursk), March 1942

These conditions in Belarus, Russia, and Ukraine are caused by high moisture storage capacity of black clay soils but not limited solely to the area of chernozem found in the region and works as a sponge. Roads are subject to weight limitations and closures during the period in certain districts. The phenomenon was a notable hindrance in the early 20th century, since 40% of rural villages in the erstwhile Soviet Union were not served by paved roads. The problem is less pronounced in elevated areas than in lowlands.

Roads that run through wetlands are particularly susceptible to damage. This phenomenon not only affects motorists but also pedestrians, mining, logging and agricultural companies creating deep ruts and furrows. During the time of rasputitsa, some farm products cannot be delivered to the city (i.e. to market) and must be destroyed.

Autumn thawing occurs when the average daily air temperature drops to +5°C, which reduces the evaporation of moisture, and the frequency of rains saturating the upper soil layer increases. In Canada there is definitely a rasputitsa period, though it does not occur everywhere or necessarily in the fall, and it is not considered a rasputitsa by name.

Climate change in Russia and warmer winters in the Russian Arctic are a big disadvantage: rasputitsa lasted previously for 2–3 weeks, and now it reaches two months, as an inhabitant of an island near Archangelsk said in an interview.

== Armed conflict ==
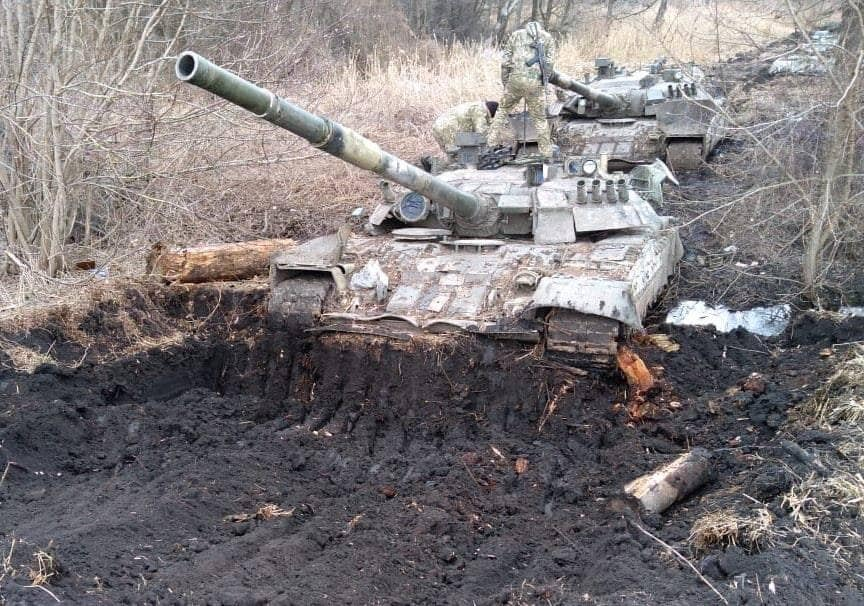
Russian tanks in Kharkiv Oblast of Ukraine, March 2022

The rasputitsa seasons are well-known as a defensive advantage in wartime. Spring thaw was a factor that helped prevent Novgorod from being overrun during the Mongol invasion of Kievan Rus' in the 13th century. The 'season of bad roads' also proved to be a great hindrance in and after the Battle of Krasnoi, when many horses, carriages and cannons were stuck in the snow or mud and left behind during the French retreat from Russia. Rasputitsa reduced the mobility of both armies but it seemed to be more favorable to the defender.

Already on 29/30 June 1812 (five days after crossing the Russian border on their march towards Vilna) "Marshal Mud" played a significant role, when a violent thunderstorm struck Lithuania during the night and continued for a day. Ca 15 or 18,000 horses were lost; they sank to their knees on the primitively constructed roads through mostly swampy areas near Trakai. The Grande Armée lost 50,000 men in two days due to fatigue and want.

"General Mud" is a nickname (sometimes) used in the Western Front in the Battles of Ypres in December 1916.

During World War II, the months-long muddy period slowed the German advance into the Soviet Union during the Operation Typhoon on the Eastern Front. It is commonly alleged that this have helped save Moscow from falling under a German military occupation. This is a dubious assertion, because, first, the German progress was already slowing down due to Soviet resistance, and second, rasputitsa hampered both Soviet and German logistics in the same degree. The advent of Blitzkrieg had the disadvantage that while tanks could operate effectively in summer or in winter, they proved less useful in spring and autumn, while the logistics via the railway system was not as efficient as expected after the Germans advanced deeper into Russia.

Prior to the Russian invasion of Ukraine, some analysts identified the logistical challenges of the mud season as a likely hindrance to any large-scale invasion in spring. When Russia crossed the border, many of its mobile units found themselves stranded in fields and limited to major roads, where resistance and logistical issues significantly slowed the advance toward Kyiv and elsewhere.

== See also ==
- Cold-weather warfare
  - Russian Winter or General Winter

== Sources ==
- Bourgogne, Adrien Jean Baptiste François (1899). Cottin, Paul; Hénault, Maurice (eds.). Memoirs of Sergeant Bourgogne (1812-1813). London: William Heinemann, via reprint, Moscow: Ripol Classic. ISBN 5875000767.
- Siegelbaum, Lewis H. (2008). "Roadlessness and the 'Path to Communism'". The Journal of Transport History. 29 (2): 277–294. doi:10.7227/TJTH.29.2.8.
