= Mud season =

Period in late winter/early spring in northern climates

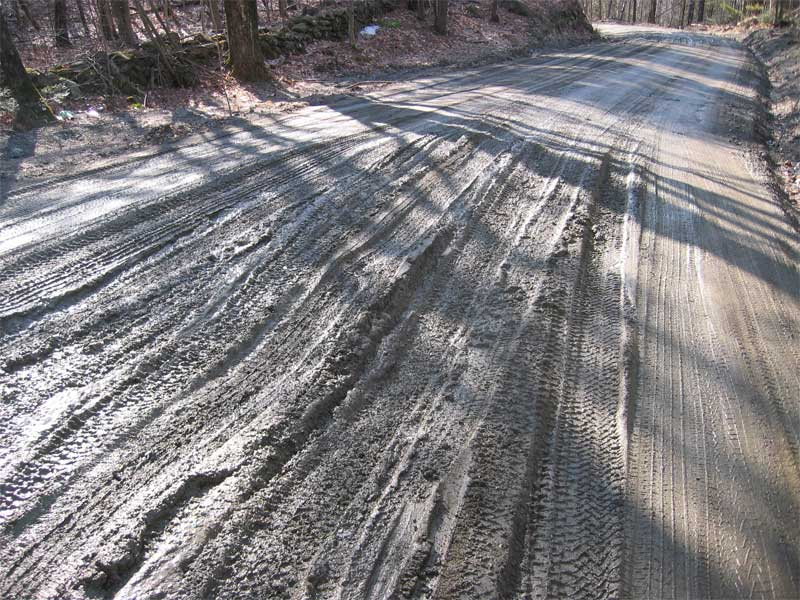
Muddy dirt road during mud season in Maine

Mud season (US English) or breakup (Canadian English) is a period in late winter and early spring when travel over ice is no longer safe and travel overland is more difficult as frozen earth thaws and soil becomes muddy from melting snow.

== Description ==
Mud season occurs in places where the ground freezes in winter and thaws in spring. Dirt roads and paths become muddy because the deeply frozen ground thaws from the surface down as the air temperature warms above freezing. The frozen lower layers of ground prevent water from percolating into the soil so the surface layers of soil become saturated with water.

Clay-based soil, especially when combined with poor drainage, is especially prone to forming deep and sticky mud. In sandy soils, the top unfrozen layer becomes waterlogged during thaws, but does not form viscous mud. On the Great Plains, a particular type of clay (bentonite clay, or aluminum phyllosilicate) turns into a sticky form of soil called gumbo during snowmelt and spring rains.

Mud season can be expensive for towns due to the damage done to dirt roads. One report concluded that the cost of re-engineering dirt roads so that they would remain passable during mud season in the state of Vermont could run as high as $140,000 per mile ($87,000/km).

Transportation problems during mud season have military implications, due to the bogging down of horses and military equipment in deep mud.

During mud season, soil becomes fragile and care must be exercised in protected and recreational areas.

=== "Breakup" ===
"Breakup" originally referred to the "breaking up" of river and lake ice. This event is eagerly anticipated in many regions of Canada, because it marks when different modes of transportation can be used. Vehicles from dog sleds to snowmobiles and even tractor trailers can safely traverse ice roads in the winter and aircraft with skis for landing gear can land on ice in winter, but not near breakup. By contrast after breakup, various boats can once again use the water.

The exact date this occurs varies across the North, and corresponds to different seasons in the indigenous calendars of different regions. In the Cree and Ojibwe calendars, one of the six seasons is called minoskamin (Woods Cree: ᒥᖪᐢᑲᒥᐣ, mithoskamin; Atikamekw: miroskamin, etc.) which is usually translated as "breakup". For the Woods Cree of Northern Saskatchewan this occurred in roughly May and June on the English calendar before the effects of recent climate change. By contrast the New England mud season of (or "unlocking" as Kurt Vonnegut called it) is in March and April.

Famously, the exact date of the breakup on the Yukon River in Dawson City has been the subject of gambling since the Klondike Gold Rush, providing climate researchers with a rare unbroken record of climate data in such a remote region.

The sense of "breakup" was later expanded to the time of the year when the frozen soil that can support heavy vehicles softens. This is especially used in the oil patch (which is concentrated on the Great Plains and western portions of the boreal forest of Canada (i.e. the Western Canadian Sedimentary Basin) when well drilling activity halts and work camps "break up" for the spring.

== Around the world ==
The term mud season is used in northern climates in North America, particularly in rural northern New England and the northern areas of the Great Lakes. It is often jokingly called the "fifth season". While significantly muddy conditions also occur throughout the Appalachians and in other mountainous regions, they are not as tightly tied to season.

In Sweden, the term Swedish: menföre 'bad going' and in Finland, the term Finnish: kelirikko 'broken state of roads' (lit. 'weather-break') apply to two kinds of conditions. One meaning is when water is too iced over for boats but not strong enough to cross on foot or in other vehicles. Another meaning of the Finnish term is similar to rasputitsa: deterioration of the load-bearing capacity and passability of a road due to partial melting or weather conditions. Another meaning of the Swedish term is show inadequate for sledge. Finnish eastern dialects also have the Russian loanword rospuutto (IPA: [ˈrospuːtːo]), which has the same usage as rasputitsa.

=== Eastern Europe ===
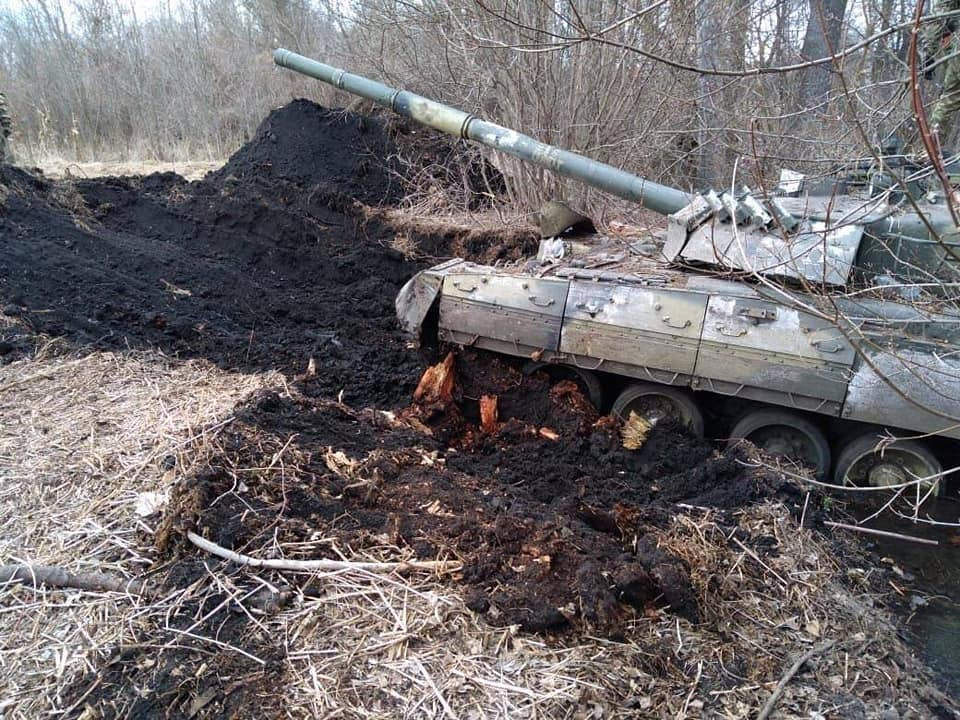
A Russian tank stuck in mud during the Russian invasion of Ukraine in March 2022

The Rasputitsa in Russian (literally "season of bad roads"), or Bezdorizhzhya in Ukrainian, is a term for the mud season that occurs in various rural areas of Eastern Europe, when the rapid snowmelt or thawing of frozen ground combined with wet weather in spring, or heavy rains in the autumn, lead to muddy conditions that make travel on unpaved roads problematic and even treacherous.

Rasputitsa has repeatedly "rescued" Russia during wars by causing enemy vehicles and artillery pieces to become mired in the mud, and has been credited, alongside the general conditions of winter, with incumbering both the military campaigns of Napoleon and Hitler in the 20th century, as well as Putin in his 2022 invasion of Ukraine.

Further back in history, the Mongols may also have been deterred from attacking Novgorod by the muddy bog produced by an early spring thaw.

Prior to the Russian invasion of Ukraine, some analysts identified the logistical challenges of the mud season as a likely hindrance to any large-scale invasion in spring. When Russia crossed the border, many of its mobile units found themselves stranded in fields and limited to major roads, where resistance and logistical issues significantly slowed the advance toward Kyiv and elsewhere.

== Cultural references ==
In Maine, Vermont, upstate New York, and New Hampshire, the phrase "mud season" can be used as a shorthand reference to the vicissitudes and peculiarities of life in the region. The term has been used as the title of magazines, books, and at least one movie.
